= New Revised Standard Version =

English translation of the Bible

- NRSV Bible with the Apocrypha
- Abbreviation: NRSV
- Complete Bible published: 1989
- Derived from: Revised Standard Version (2nd ed., 1971)
- Textual basis: OT: Biblia Hebraica Stuttgartensia (2nd ed., 1983) and additional sources; Apocrypha: Septuagint (Rahlfs' and Göttingen) and additional sources; NT: UBS Greek New Testament (3rd corrected ed.) (Note: The translation teams had preliminary access to "changes to be introduced into the critical apparatus of the ... 4th edition.")
- Translation type: Formal equivalence
- Reading level: 11.0
- Version revision: 2021 (Note: See the section regarding the NRSV Updated Edition (NRSVue).)
- Publisher: National Council of the Churches of Christ in the USA
- Copyright: New Revised Standard Version Bible, copyright © 1989 National Council of the Churches of Christ in the United States of America. Used by permission. All rights reserved.
- Religious affiliation: Protestant (Note: Primarily associated with mainline Protestantism, the New Revised Standard Version features the work of "translation teams" that are "both ecumenical and interfaith," consisting of "scholars affiliated with various Protestant denominations, as well as several Roman Catholic members, an Eastern Orthodox member, and a Jewish member who serves in the Old Testament section.")
- Genesis 1:1–3 In the beginning when God created the heavens and the earth, the earth was a formless void and darkness covered the face of the deep, while a wind from God swept over the face of the waters. Then God said, "Let there be light"; and there was light. John 3:16 "For God so loved the world that he gave his only Son, so that everyone who believes in him may not perish but may have eternal life.

The New Revised Standard Version (NRSV) is a translation of the Bible in American English. First published in 1989 by the National Council of Churches, the NRSV was created by an ecumenical committee of scholars "comprising about thirty members". The NRSV is a revision of the Revised Standard Version, and relies on recently published critical editions of the original Hebrew, Aramaic, and Greek texts. It is thus a revision in a series of English translations that has been identified as beginning with the Tyndale Bible. A major revision of the NRSV, the New Revised Standard Version Updated Edition (NRSVue), was released in 2021.

Considered the academic standard among biblical scholars, the NRSV was intended as a translation to serve the devotional, liturgical, and scholarly needs of the broadest possible range of Christian religious adherents.

The full 84 book translation includes the Protestant enumeration of the Old Testament, the Apocrypha, and the New Testament; another version of the NRSV includes the deuterocanonical books as part of the Old Testament, which is normative in the canon of Catholicism, along with the New Testament (totalling 73 books).

The translation appears in three main formats: (1) an edition including the Protestant enumeration of the Old Testament, the Apocrypha, and the New Testament (as well an edition that only includes the Protestant enumeration of the Old Testament and New Testament); (2) a Catholic edition with all the books of that canon in their customary order, and (3) the Common Bible, which includes the books that appear in Protestant, Catholic, and Eastern Orthodox canons (but not additional books from Oriental Orthodox traditions, such as the Syriac and Ethiopian canons). A special edition of the NRSV, called the "Anglicized Edition", employs British English spelling and grammar instead of American English.

== History ==
The New Revised Standard Version was translated by the Division of Christian Education (now Bible Translation and Utilization) of the National Council of Churches in the United States. The group included scholars representing Orthodox, Catholic and Protestant Christian groups as well as Jewish representation in the group responsible for the Hebrew Scriptures or Old Testament. The mandate given the committee was summarized in a dictum: "As literal as possible, as free as necessary."

== Canon ==
The New Revised Standard Version is available in a 66-book Protestant Bible that only includes the Old Testament and New Testament; a 73-book Catholic Edition containing the Catholic enumeration of the Old Testament (with integrated deuterocanonical books) and New Testament; and an 84-book Ecumenical Bible that includes the Old Testament, Apocrypha and New Testament.

== Committee of translators ==
The following scholars were active on the NRSV Committee of translators at the time of publication.

- William A. Beardslee
- Phyllis A. Bird
- George Coats
- Demetrios J. Constantelos
- Robert C. Dentan
- Alexander A. DiLella, OFM
- J. Cheryl Exum
- Reginald H. Fuller
- Paul D. Hanson
- Walter Harrelson
- William L. Holladay
- Sherman E. Johnson
- Robert A. Kraft
- George M. Landes
- Conrad E. L’Heureux
- S. Dean McBride, Jr.
- Bruce M. Metzger
- Patrick D. Miller
- Paul S. Minear
- Lucetta Mowry
- Roland E. Murphy, O. Carm.
- Harry Orlinsky
- Marvin H. Pope
- Jimmy Jack McBee Roberts
- Alfred v. Rohr Sauer
- Katharine D. Sakenfeld
- James A. Sanders
- Gene M. Tucker
- Eugene C. Ulrich
- Allen Wikgren

== Principles of revision ==
=== Improved manuscripts and translations ===
The Old Testament translation of the RSV was completed before the Dead Sea Scrolls were available to scholars. The NRSV was intended to take advantage of this and other manuscript discoveries, and to reflect advances in scholarship.

=== Gender language ===
In the preface to the NRSV Bruce Metzger wrote for the committee that "many in the churches have become sensitive to the danger of linguistic sexism arising from the inherent bias of the English language towards the masculine gender, a bias that in the case of the Bible has often restricted or obscured the meaning of the original text". The RSV observed the older, more accurate convention of using masculine nouns in a gender-neutral sense (e.g., "man" instead of "person"), and in some cases used a masculine word where the source language used a neutral word. This move has been criticized by some, including within the Catholic Church, and continues to be a point of contention today. The NRSV by contrast adopted a less accurate, more modern policy of inclusiveness in gender language. According to Metzger, "The mandates from the Division specified that, in references to men and women, masculine-oriented language should be eliminated as far as this can be done without altering passages that reflect the historical situation of ancient patriarchal culture."

== Reception ==
Many mainline Protestant churches officially approve the NRSV for both private and public use. The Episcopal Church (United States) in Canon II.2 added the NRSV to the list of translations approved for church services. It is also widely used by the United Methodist Church, the Evangelical Lutheran Church in America, the Christian Church (Disciples of Christ), the Presbyterian Church (USA), the Presbyterian Church in Canada, the United Church of Christ, the Reformed Church in America, the United Church of Canada, and the Uniting Church in Australia.

In accordance with the 1983 Code of Canon Law, Canon 825.1, the NRSV with the deuterocanonical books received the Imprimatur of the United States Conference of Catholic Bishops and the Canadian Conference of Catholic Bishops, meaning that the NRSV (Catholic Edition) is officially approved by the Catholic Church and can be profitably used by Catholics in private study and devotional reading. The New Revised Standard Version, Catholic Edition also has the imprimatur, granted on 12 September 1991 and 15 October 1991, respectively. For public worship, such as at weekly Mass, most Catholic Bishops' Conferences in English-speaking countries require the use of other translations, either the adapted New American Bible in the dioceses of the United States and the Philippines or the English Standard Version and Revised New Jerusalem Bible in most of the rest of the English-speaking world. However, the Canadian conference and the Vatican approved a modification of the NRSV for lectionary use in 2008. The NRSV, along with the Revised Standard Version, is also quoted in several places in the English-language edition of the Catechism of the Catholic Church, the latter of which summarizes Catholic doctrine and belief in written form.

In 1990 the synod of the Orthodox Church in America decided not to permit use of the NRSV in liturgy or in Bible studies on the grounds that it is highly "divergent from the Holy Scriptures traditionally read aloud in the sacred services of the Church."

== NRSV Catholic Edition (NRSV-CE) ==
The New Revised Standard Version Catholic Edition (NRSV-CE) is an edition of the NRSV for Catholics. It contains all the canonical books of Scripture accepted by the Catholic Church arranged in the traditional Catholic order. Because of the presence of Catholic scholars on the original NRSV translation team, no other changes to the text were needed.

An Anglicized Text form of the NRSV-CE, embodying the preferences of users of British English, is also available from various publishers.

=== Liturgical use and approval ===
The NRSV-CE received the imprimatur of the United States Conference of Catholic Bishops and the Canadian Conference of Catholic Bishops in 1991, granting official approval for Catholic use in private study and devotional reading.

In 2007, the Canadian conference and the Vatican approved a modification of the NRSV for lectionary use beginning the following year. The NRSV-CE, along with the Revised Standard Version (RSV), is also one of the texts adapted and quoted in the English-language edition of the Catechism of the Catholic Church.

== NRSV Updated Edition (NRSVue) ==
New Revised Standard Version Updated Edition
- Abbreviation: NRSVue
- Complete Bible published: 2021
- Derived from: New Revised Standard Version
- Textual basis: OT: Biblia Hebraica Quinta; Biblia Hebraica Stuttgartensia (2nd ed., 1983); Apocrypha: Septuagint (Rahlfs'; Göttingen); additional sources; NT: UBS Greek New Testament (5th corrected ed.); The Greek New Testament: SBL Edition; Editio Critica Maior
- Translation type: Formal equivalence
- Reading level: High school
- Publisher: National Council of the Churches of Christ in the USA
- Copyright: New Revised Standard Version Updated Edition, copyright © 2021 National Council of the Churches of Christ in the United States of America. Used by permission. All rights reserved.
- Religious affiliation: Protestant (Note: Primarily associated with mainline Protestantism, the New Revised Standard Version Updated Edition features the work of "translation teams" that are "both ecumenical and interfaith," having developed the NRSVue as "a Bible produced by consensus that can be used among and across pluralistic communities in contexts both academic and religious.")
- Webpage: www.friendshippress.org/pages/about-the-nrsvue
- Genesis 1:1–3 When God began to create the heavens and the earth, the earth was complete chaos, and darkness covered the face of the deep, while a wind from God swept over the face of the waters. Then God said, "Let there be light," and there was light. John 3:16 "For God so loved the world that he gave his only Son, so that everyone who believes in him may not perish but may have eternal life.

The New Revised Standard Version Updated Edition (NRSVue) is a major revision of the NRSV. A three-year process of reviewing and updating the text of the NRSV was announced at the 2017 Annual Meeting of the Society of Biblical Literature. The update was managed by the SBL following an agreement with the copyright-holding National Council of Churches (NCC). The stated focuses of the review are incorporating advances in textual criticism since the 1989 publication of the NRSV, improving the textual notes, and reviewing the style and rendering of the translation. A team of more than fifty scholars, led by an editorial board, is responsible for the review. It was released for digital purchase on December 25, 2021, with the first print editions following in 2022.

Continuing from the original NRSV, the NRSVue is also available with specific editions for the respective Protestant, Catholic, and Ecumenical canons. The NRSVue currently serves as the base text for the SBL Study Bible and the Westminster Study Bible. The New Oxford Annotated Bible, the fifth edition of which is based on the 1989 NRSV text, is slated to be revised into a sixth edition with the NRSVue as its new base.

On September 29, 2025, Friendship Press announced that the United States Conference of Catholic Bishops had granted an imprimatur to the NRSVue, approving the New Revised Standard Version Updated Edition, Catholic Edition (NRSVue-CE) for "private use and study by the Catholic faithful".

== Study editions ==
- The Harper Study Bible (Zondervan, 1991, ISBN 0-310-90203-7)
- NRSV Reference Bible with the Apocrypha (Zondervan, 1993, ISBN 0-310-90227-4)
- NRSV Student Bible (Zondervan, 1996, ISBN 0310926823)
- The Cambridge Annotated Study Bible (Cambridge University Press, 1993, ISBN 0-521-50777-4)
- The HarperCollins Study Bible with Apocrypha (Society of Biblical Literature, 1997, ISBN 0-06-065527-5)
- The Access Bible with Apocrypha (Oxford University Press, 1999, ISBN 0-19-528217-5)
- The Spiritual Formation Bible (Zondervan, 1999, ISBN 0-310-90089-1)
- The New Interpreter's Study Bible with Apocrypha (United Methodist Publishing House, 2003, ISBN 0-687-27832-5)
- The HarperCollins Study Bible: Fully Revised & Updated (HarperOne, 2006, ISBN 978-0060786854)
- The Green Bible (HarperOne, 2008, ISBN 978-0061951121)
- The Discipleship Study Bible (Westminster John Knox, 2008, ISBN 978-0664223717)
- The Life with God Bible (Renovaré, 2009, ISBN 978-0061627644)
- Lutheran Study Bible (Augsburg Fortress, 2009, ISBN 978-0806680590)
- The Wesley Study Bible (United Methodist Publishing House, 2009, ISBN 978-0-687-64503-9)
- The Guidebook: The NRSV Student Bible (Zondervan, 2012, ISBN 978-0061988189)
- The Jewish Annotated New Testament, 2nd edition (Oxford University Press, 2017, ISBN 978-0190461850)
- The New Oxford Annotated Bible with Apocrypha, 5th edition (Oxford University Press, 2018, ISBN 978-0190276072)
- NRSV Cultural Backgrounds Study Bible (Zondervan, 2019, ISBN 978-0310452683)
- Baylor Annotated Study Bible (Baylor University Press, 2019, ISBN 978-1481308250)
- The Word on Fire Bible, 7 volumes (Word on Fire, 2020–ongoing)
- The SBL Study Bible with Apocryphal/Deuterocanonical Books (HarperOne, 2023, ISBN 978-0062969439)
