= Katharine Doob Sakenfeld =

American Old Testament scholar

Katharine Doob Sakenfeld (born 1940) is an American Old Testament scholar. She is Professor of Old Testament Literature and Exegesis Emerita at Princeton Theological Seminary, having previously been William Albright Eisenberger Professor of Old Testament Literature and Exegesis.

Sakenfeld studied at the University of Rhode Island and Harvard Divinity School before obtaining her Ph.D. at Harvard University. She was ordained as a Presbyterian teaching elder in 1970, and has served as the moderator of the Presbytery of New Brunswick in the PCUSA. She served on the translation committee of the New Revised Standard Version, and was president of the Society of Biblical Literature in 2007.

Sakenfeld has written commentaries on Numbers and Ruth, and was general editor of the New Interpreter's Dictionary of the Bible. In 2006 a Festschrift was published in her honor: Engaging the Bible in a Gendered World: An Introduction to Feminist Biblical Interpretation in Honor of Katharine Doob Sakenfeld, which included contributions from F. W. Dobbs-Allsopp, Choon-Leong Seow, Phyllis Bird and Patrick D. Miller.

== Selected works ==
- The meaning of hesed in the Hebrew Bible : a new inquiry, 1977
- Faithfulness in action : loyalty in Biblical perspective , 1985
- Journeying with God : a commentary on the book of Numbers, 1995
- Just wives? : stories of power and survival in the Old Testament and today, 2003
