= Renita J. Weems =

American biblical scholar, theologian, author and ordained minister

- Born: June 26, 1954 (age 72)
- Occupations: Biblical scholar, ethicist, professor, author, ordained minister

Academic work
- Discipline: womanist biblical studies, black church studies, feminist biblical criticism, prophetic religion, and black Religious Thought
- Institutions: Vanderbilt University, Spelman college, American Baptist College
- Main interests: Womanism, biblical scholarship, ethics and theology

Renita J. Weems (born 1954) is an American Protestant biblical scholar, theologian, author and ordained minister. She is the first black woman to earn a Ph.D. in Old Testament studies in the United States. She is the Dean of Gammon Theological Seminary in Atlanta, Georgia. She was influenced by the movement in the last half of the 20th century which argues that context matters and shapes our scholarship and understanding of truth. She is best known for her contribution to womanist theology, feminist studies in religion and black religious thought. She is recognized as one of the first scholars to bring black women's ways of reading and interpreting the Bible into mainstream academic discourse. In 1989 she received a Ph.D. in Old Testament/Hebrew Bible studies from Princeton Theological Seminary making her the first African American woman to earn a Ph.D. in the field. Her work in womanist biblical interpretation is frequently cited in feminist theology and womanist theology.

== Education and influences ==
Weems was born and raised in Atlanta, Georgia, and attended public schools there. She earned her undergraduate degree in economics from Wellesley College. She was one of the many female econ majors (FEMS) trained and mentored by the feminist economics professor at Wellesley, Carolyn Shaw Bell, who enrolled in MBA programs and worked in executive jobs on Wall Street in unprecedented numbers beginning in the 1970s. Upon graduation from Wellesley, Weems worked for a short time for Coopers & Lybrand Public Accounting Firm and later as a broker for Merrill Lynch.

After a brief stint on Wall Street, Weems sought a career in writing. Her earliest published writings appeared in the late 1970s and early 1980s in Essence and Ms. magazines, and in black feminist journals like Sage and Conditions V. The 1970s was a defining year in black women's literary production from the literary writings of up-and-coming writers like Toni Morrison, Alice Walker, Ntozake Shange, and Gayle Jones to the monthly columns and personal lifestyle writing appearing in magazines like Essence to the serious black feminist literary writings by Audre Lorde, Barbara Smith, and Michelle Wallace. Weems was greatly influenced by this era of black women's literature and was living in New York at a time which she said gave her a front row seat to the lively and generative conversations taking place within feminist literary circles at the time about women's equality and black women's survival.

Weems has been deeply impacted by and involved in the black church throughout her life. She considers it her life's mission to find ways to strike a balance between her political views and her spiritual values, her feminist/womanist consciousness with religious faith, her thirst for justice with her hunger for spiritual fulfillment. She enrolled in seminary in 1980. She earned her master's degree in 1983 and later her Ph.D. in 1989 from Princeton Theological Seminary. She was the first African American woman to earn a Ph.D. in Old Testament Studies. Her expectation was that after completing her M.Div. degree she would like the men in her class to be hired in some area of full-time parish ministry but when church doors remained closed to her because she was a woman, she had to come up with a Plan B. Becoming a scholar and professor was not something she had considered, but an Old Testament professor and an influential figure in the Biblical theology movement, Bernhard W. Anderson, and also Katherine M. O'Connor, who served as his teaching assistant at the time, convinced her she had a future in Old Testament studies. She decided to pursue a doctorate degree in biblical studies. Weems' doctoral dissertation title was "Sexual Violence as an Image for Divine Retribution in Prophetic Writings". Old Testament professors Patrick D. Miller and Katherine Sakenfeld were her dissertation advisors.

== Career ==
Weems is the first African American woman to earn a Ph.D. in Hebrew Bible.

Weems taught on the faculty the Divinity School at Vanderbilt University in Nashville, TN (1987-2003). She served as the 2003-2005 William and Camille Cosby Professor of Humanities at Spelman College in Atlanta, Ga. She was vice president, Academic Dean, and Professor of Biblical Studies at American Baptist College in Tennessee, ending her time in 2017. She has taught part time and has served as a senior visiting professor at several divinity schools and seminaries across the country since 2017.

Weems was ordained an elder in the African Methodist Episcopal Church in 1984.

== Honors ==
Weems is featured in Black Stars: African American Religious Leaders (2008), a collection of biographies of some of the most notable Black religious leaders over the last 200 years, including such figures as Adam Clayton Powell, Elijah Muhammad, Sojourner Truth, Howard Thurman, and Martin Luther King Jr.

Her 1999 book, Listening for God: A Minister's Journey Through Silence and Doubt (Simon & Schuster), won the Religious Communicators' Council's 1999 Wilbur Award for "excellence in communicating spiritual values to the secular media".

The National Council of Churches, under the presidency of the Rev. Vashti Murphy McKenzie, awarded Weems the President's Award for Excellence in Faithful Leadership in 2023.

She was the first African-American woman to deliver the Lyman Beecher Lecture at Yale University (2008).

== Publications ==
- Showing Mary : how women can share prayers, wisdom, and the blessings of God (1st trade ed.). West Bloomfield, Mich.: Walk Worthy Press. ISBN 9780446695282. OCLC 61722833.
- Just a sister away : understanding the timeless connection between women of today and women in the Bible (1st Warner Books ed.). New York: Warner Books. ISBN 9780446578943. OCLC 60596133.
- I asked for intimacy : stories of blessings, betrayals, and birthings. San Diego, Calif.: LuraMedia. ISBN 9780931055805. OCLC 28148479.
- Battered love : marriage, sex, and violence in the Hebrew prophets. Minneapolis: Fortress Press. ISBN 9780800629489. OCLC 33333933.
- (Co-authored with CeCe Winans) On a positive note : her joyous faith, her life in music, and her everyday blessings. Weems, Renita J., 1954-. New York: Pocket Books. ISBN 9780671020019. OCLC 45144960
- "Song of Songs" in The new interpreter's Bible. Old Testament survey. Nashville: Abingdon Press. 2005. ISBN 9780687053445. OCLC 62330657.
- "Jeremiah" in Global Bible commentary. Patte, Daniel., Okure, Teresa. Nashville: Abingdon Press. 2004. ISBN 9780687064038. OCLC 55955180.
- What matters most : ten lessons in living passionately from the Song of Solomon. West Bloomfield, MI: Walk Worthy Press. ISBN 9780446532419. OCLC 53315250.
- Listening for God: A Minister's Journey through Silence and Doubt. New York: Simon & Schuster. 1999 ISBN 9780684863139 OCLC 1020247830.
