= J. J. M. Roberts =

Biblical commentator (born 1939)

- Born: May 28, 1939 (age 87)
- Occupations: Biblical commentator, professor
- Title: William Henry Green Professor of Old Testament Literature (Emeritus) at Princeton Theological Seminary

Academic background
- Education: Abilene Christian University, Harvard University
- Thesis: The Early Akkadian Pantheon: a study of the Semitic deities attested in Mesopotamia before UR III (1969)

Academic work
- Discipline: Biblical studies
- Institutions: Princeton Theological Seminary

Jimmy Jack McBee Roberts (born May 28, 1939), known as J. J. M. Roberts, is William Henry Green Professor of Old Testament Literature (Emeritus) at Princeton Theological Seminary in Princeton, New Jersey. A member of the Churches of Christ, Roberts attended Abilene Christian University before pursuing doctoral work at Harvard University.

His teaching and research interests laid in comparative studies involving Mesopotamian and Israelite religion, Old Testament prophecy, Semitic languages, and Hebrew lexicography. His publications include Nahum, Habakkuk, and Zephaniah (OTL). He served on the editorial boards of the Journal of Biblical Literature, Catholic Biblical Quarterly, the Bulletin of the American Schools of Oriental Research, and Restoration Quarterly, and was editor of the SBL OT dissertation series and a member of the New Revised Standard Version translation committee. He was the coeditor of the Princeton Classical Hebrew Lexicon Project.

== Works ==
=== Books ===
- Roberts, J. J. M. (1969). The Early Akkadian Pantheon: A Study of the Semitic Deities Attested in Mesopotamia before UR III (PhD dissertation). Cambridge, Massachusetts: Harvard University. OCLC 76997136.
- ——— (1972). The Earliest Semitic Pantheon: A Study of the Semitic Deities Attested in Mesopotamia before Ur III. Baltimore, Maryland: Johns Hopkins University Press. ISBN 978-0-801-81388-7. OCLC 379068.
- ———; Goedicke, Hans (1975). Unity and Diversity: Essays in the History, Literature, and Religion of the Ancient Near East. Johns Hopkins Near Eastern Studies. Baltimore, Maryland: Johns Hopkins University Press. ISBN 978-0-801-81638-3. OCLC 1322165.
- ———; Miller, Patrick D. (1977). The Hand of the Lord: A Reassessment of the "Ark Narrative" of 1 Samuel. Johns Hopkins Near Eastern Studies. Baltimore, Maryland: Johns Hopkins University Press. ISBN 978-0-801-81920-9. OCLC 2542903.
- ——— (1991). Nahum, Habakkuk, and Zephaniah: A Commentary. Old Testament Library (1st ed.). Louisville, Kentucky: Westminster, John Knox Press. ISBN 978-0-664-21937-6. OCLC 22732269.
- ——— (2002). The Bible and the Ancient Near East: Collected Essays. Winona Lake, Indiana: Eisenbrauns. ISBN 978-1-575-06066-8. OCLC 50422851.
- ———; Dobbs-Allsopp, F. W.; Seow, Choon-Leong; Whitaker, Richard E. (2004). Hebrew Inscriptions: Texts from the Biblical Period of the Monarchy with Concordance. New Haven, Connecticut: Yale University Press. ISBN 978-0-300-10397-7. OCLC 469281919.
- ——— (2015). Machinist, Peter (ed.). First Isaiah: A Commentary. Hermeneia – A Critical and Historical Commentary on the Bible. Minneapolis, Minnesota: Fortress Press. ISBN 978-0-800-66080-2. OCLC 908176161.

=== Articles ===
- ——— (1980). "A Note on Isaiah 28:12". Harvard Theological Review. 73 (1): 49–51. doi:10.1017/S0017816000002029. ISSN 0017-8160. JSTOR 1509477.

== Festschrift ==
- Batto, Bernard F.; Roberts, Kathryn L. (2004). David and Zion: biblical studies in honor of J. J. M. Roberts. Winona Lake, Indiana: Eisenbrauns. ISBN 978-1-575-06092-7. OCLC 54454885.
