= Asian American biblical hermeneutics =

Interpretation of the Christian Bible

Asian American biblical hermeneutics or Asian American biblical interpretation is the study of the interpretation of the Christian Bible, informed by Asian American history and experiences.

== History ==
Mary F. Foskett traces the roots of Asian American biblical hermeneutics to the rise of Asian biblical hermeneutics, as initially developed in the 1970s and 1980s by Kosuke Koyama, C. S. Song, Archie C. C. Lee, and R. S. Sugirtharajah. This gave inspiration for Asian Americans to develop their own hermeneutical methods and, in 1995, the "Asian and Asian American Biblical Studies Consultation" was established in the Society of Biblical Literature. Figures such as Gale A. Yee, Kwok Pui-lan, Tat-siong Benny Liew, and Sze-kar Wan challenged the dominant historical critical approach to studying the Bible as being insufficient for addressing the ethical concerns of the present, especially as experienced by Asian Americans. This has not led to a simple rejection of historical criticism. Instead, it has tended to "deploy historical inquiry with a decidedly ethical consciousness."

Since the 2000s, in the midst of third-wave feminism, there has also been the rise of Asian American feminist biblical hermeneutics. Some of the first works in the area include Gale A. Yee's Poor Banished Children of Eve: Woman as Evil in the Hebrew Bible (2003) and Kwok Pui-lan's Postcolonial Imagination and Feminist Theology (2005).

There has been some challenge against Asian American biblical hermeneutics as largely being developed by mainline scholars. In 2020, Asian American Evangelicals established within the Institute for Biblical Research an "Asian-American Biblical Interpretation: Evangelical Voices" research group, hoping to pave new ground for Evangelical voices within the scholarship of Asian American biblical hermeneutics.

== See also ==
- African American biblical hermeneutics
