= Achtemeier =

Achtemeier is a surname. Notable people with the surname include:

- Elizabeth Achtemeier (1926–2002), American biblical scholar
- Paul J. Achtemeier (1927–2013), American biblical scholar
