= F. W. Dobbs-Allsopp =

American biblical scholar

- Occupations: Biblical scholar, epigrapher, and literary theorist
- Title: Professor of Old Testament, or Hebrew Bible

Academic background
- Education: Furman University, Princeton Theological Seminary
- Alma mater: Johns Hopkins University (PhD)
- Thesis: (1992)

Academic work
- Institutions: Princeton Theological Seminary

F. W. "Chip" Dobbs-Allsopp is a biblical scholar, epigrapher, and literary theorist. Currently professor of Old Testament, or Hebrew Bible, at Princeton Theological Seminary, he has taught and written extensively on Semitic languages, the origins of alphabetic writing, biblical poetry, poetics, and literary criticism.

== Life ==
After earning a B.A. in history at Furman University, in 1984, Dobbs-Allsopp attended Princeton Theological Seminary, where he received an M.Div., in 1987. There, he was trained in Semitic philology and biblical interpretation by the notable specialists J.J.M. Roberts and Patrick D. Miller. He then pursued doctoral studies in Hebrew Bible and Northwest Semitic Philology at Johns Hopkins University, which he completed in 1992. At Yale University, Dobbs-Allsopp served as assistant professor of Semitics (1994–1999) and director of undergraduate studies (1995–97) before returning to Princeton as assistant (1999–2002), associate (2002–2014), and full (2015–present) professor of Old Testament. He has also acted as visiting assistant professor in Ugaritic at the University of Pennsylvania (2001–02).

== Professional Activities ==
An expert in Semitic languages, Dobbs-Allsopp published, inter alia, perhaps the earliest alphabetic inscription, a Proto-Sinaitic text from Wadi el-Hol, with Egyptologist John C. Darnell. He also edited a major volume on Hebrew inscriptions with Roberts, Choon-Leong Seow, and Richard E. Whitaker (Yale University Press).

With respect to biblical scholarship, Dobbs-Allsopp has written two monographs on the book of Lamentations, in addition to any number of other essays in peer-reviewed journals and edited volumes. His most recent volume, On Biblical Poetry (Oxford University Press), has received early accolades from other prominent figures in the field of biblical studies. For Oxford Bibliographies, he co-edited the entry on Hebrew poetry. Finally, he is slated to edit the Megillot for The Hebrew Bible: A Critical Edition, formerly called the Oxford Hebrew Bible.

Dobbs-Allsopp has sat on numerous editorial boards: from the Society of Biblical Literature's Writings from the Ancient World and Walter de Gruyter's "Beiträge zur alttestamentlichen Wissenschaft" through the Journal of Biblical Literature and Maarav to the Princeton Classical Hebrew Lexicon Project as well as the Ugaritic Tablets Digital Edition Project. In addition, he has held membership to the American Oriental Society, American Schools of Oriental Research, the Society of Biblical Literature, the Columbia University Hebrew Bible Seminar, the Lenox House Colloquium, and the Oriental Club of New Haven.

== Selected works ==
=== Books ===
- Dobbs-Allsopp, F. W. (1993). Weep, O Daughter of Zion: A Study of the City-Lament Genre in the Hebrew Bible. Biblica Et Orientalia. Vol. 44. Rome: Editrice Pontificio Instituto Biblico. ISBN 978-8-8765-3346-4. OCLC 27858680.
- ——— (2002). Lamentations. Interpretation, a Bible commentary for teaching and preaching. Louisville, KY: Westminster, John Knox Press. ISBN 978-0-804-23141-1. OCLC 47240789.
- ———; Roberts, J. J. M.; Seow, Choon-Leong; Whitaker, Richard E. (2004). Hebrew Inscriptions: texts from the biblical period of the monarchy with concordance. New Haven, CT; London: Yale University Press. ISBN 978-0-300-10397-7. OCLC 469281919.
- ———; Darnell, John Coleman; Lundberg, Marilyn; McCarter, P. Kyle; Zuckerman, Bruce (2006). "Two Early Alphabetic Inscriptions from Wadi el-Ḥôl: New evidence for the origin of the alphabet from the Western Desert of Egypt". Annual of the American Schools of Oriental Research. 59. Boston, MA: American Schools of Oriental Research: 63–124. JSTOR 3768583.
- ——— (2015). On Biblical Poetry. New York, NY: Oxford University Press. ISBN 978-0-1997-6690-1. OCLC 893669005.

=== Online resource ===
- ———; James, Elaine T. (2012). "Hebrew poetry". New York, NY: Oxford University Press. OCLC 858989675.
