= V-12 colleges and universities by state =

During the advent of World War II, the U.S. Navy turned to liberal arts colleges to provide a basic education for their recruits. Between July 1, 1943, and June 30, 1946, more than 125,000 individuals were enrolled in the V-12 Navy College Training Program which was offered in 131 colleges and universities throughout the United States. The purpose of the V-12 program was to grant bachelor's degrees to future officers from both the U.S. Navy and the Marine Corps.

== States in alphabetical order ==
Individual programs at each college varied and included Line units (which were the majority and therefore not indicated), Dental units, Medical units and Theological units. Some colleges were host to more than one type of unit.

=== Alabama ===
- Howard College
- University of Alabama School of Medicine – Medical unit

=== Arizona ===
- Arizona State Teachers College

=== Arkansas ===
- Arkansas A&M College
- University of Arkansas College of Medicine – Medical unit

=== California ===
- California Institute of Technology
- College of Physicians and Surgeons (San Francisco) – Dental unit
- College of Medical Evangelists – Medical unit
- College of the Pacific
- Occidental College
- Stanford University School of Medicine – Medical unit
- University of California, Berkeley Baptist Divinity School – Theological unit
- University of California, Los Angeles
- University of Redlands
- University of Southern California

=== Colorado ===
- Colorado College
- University of Colorado

=== Connecticut ===
- Hartford Theological School – Theological unit
- Trinity College
- Wesleyan University
- Yale University
- Yale University School of Medicine – Medical unit

=== Florida ===
- University of Miami

=== Georgia ===
- Columbia Theological Seminary – Theological unit
- Emory University
- Emory University School of Medicine – Medical/Dental unit
- Georgia Institute of Technology
- Mercer University
- University of Georgia School of Medicine – Medical unit

=== Idaho ===
- University of Idaho – Southern Branch

=== Illinois ===
- Chicago Theological Seminary – Theological unit
- Garrett Biblical Institute – Theological unit
- Illinois Institute of Technology
- Illinois State Normal University
- Loyola University - Stritch School of Medicine – Medical/Dental unit
- McCormick Theological Seminary – Theological unit
- Northwestern University
- Northwestern University School of Medicine – Medical unit
- University of Chicago
- University of Chicago Divinity School – Theological unit
- University of Chicago School of Medicine – Medical unit
- University of Illinois
- University of Illinois College of Medicine – Medical/Dental unit

=== Indiana ===
- DePauw University
- Indiana State Teachers College
- Indiana University School of Dentistry – Dental unit
- Indiana University School of Medicine, Indianapolis – Medical unit
- Purdue University
- University of Notre Dame
- Wabash College

=== Iowa ===
- Dubuque Theological Seminary – Theological unit
- Iowa State College
- Saint Ambrose College
- University of Dubuque

=== Kansas ===
- Bethany College
- Kansas State Teachers College
- University of Kansas
- University of Kansas School of Medicine – Medical unit
- Washburn Municipal University

=== Kentucky ===
- Berea College
- Murray State Teachers College
- University of Louisville
- University of Louisville School of Medicine – Medical/Dental unit

=== Louisiana ===
- Louisiana Polytechnic Institute
- Louisiana State University – Medical unit
- Southwestern Louisiana Institute
- Tulane University
- Tulane University School of Medicine – Medical unit

=== Maine ===
- Bates College

=== Maryland ===
- Johns Hopkins School of Medicine - Medical unit
- Mount Saint Mary's College
- University of Maryland College of Medicine - Medical/Dental unit

=== Massachusetts ===
- Andover Newton Theological School - Theological unit
- Boston University School of Medicine - Medical unit
- College of the Holy Cross
- Episcopal Theological School - Theological unit
- Harvard University
- Harvard Divinity School - Theological unit
- Massachusetts Institute of Technology
- Tufts College
- Williams College
- Worcester Polytechnic Institute

=== Michigan ===
- Alma College
- Central Michigan University
- University of Detroit School of Dentistry - Dental unit
- University of Michigan
- University of Michigan Medical College - Medical unit
- Wayne State University School of Medicine - Medical unit
- Western Michigan College

=== Minnesota ===
- College of St. Thomas
- Gustavus Adolphus College
- Luther Theological Seminary - Theological unit
- St. Mary's College
- University of Minnesota
- University of Minnesota Medical School - Dental unit

=== Mississippi ===
- Millsaps College
- Mississippi College
- University of Mississippi School of Medicine - Medical unit

=== Missouri ===
- Central College
- Central Missouri State Teachers College
- Missouri Valley College
- Northwest Missouri State Teachers College
- Park College
- Saint Louis University School of Dentistry - Dental unit
- Saint Louis University School of Medicine - Medical unit
- Southeast Missouri State Teachers College
- University of Missouri–Kansas City School of Dentistry - Dental unit
- University of Missouri, School of Basic Medical Science - Medical unit
- Washington University School of Medicine - Medical unit
- Washington University School of Dental Medicine - Dental unit
- Westminster College
- William Jewell College

=== Montana ===
- Carroll College
- Montana School of Mines

=== Nebraska ===
- Creighton University College of Medicine - Medical/Dental unit
- Doane College
- Nebraska State Teachers College
- University of Nebraska College of Medicine - Medical unit

=== New Hampshire ===
- Dartmouth College

=== New Jersey ===
- Drew University
- Princeton University
- Stevens Institute of Technology

=== New Mexico ===
- University of New Mexico

=== New York ===
- Albany Medical College - Medical unit
- Colgate University
- Colgate Rochester Divinity School - Theological unit
- Columbia University
- Cornell University
- Cornell University Medical College - Medical unit
- Hobart College
- Long Island College of Medicine - Medical unit
- New York Medical College - Medical unit
- NYU College of Medicine - Medical unit
- Rensselaer Polytechnic Institute
- St. Lawrence University
- University of Buffalo School of Dentistry - Dental unit
- University of Buffalo School of Medicine - Medical unit
- Syracuse University College of Medicine - Medical unit
- University of Rochester
- Union College
- Webb Institute of Naval Architecture

=== North Carolina ===
- Duke University
- Duke University School of Medicine - Medical unit
- University of North Carolina at Chapel Hill
- University of North Carolina School of Medicine - Medical unit
- Wake Forest College - Bowman Gray School of Medicine - Medical unit

=== North Dakota ===
- Dickinson State Teachers College
- North Dakota State School of Science
- University of North Dakota School of Medicine - Medical unit

=== Ohio ===
- Baldwin Wallace College
- Bowling Green State University
- Case School of Applied Science
- Denison University
- John Carroll College
- Miami University
- Oberlin College
- Oberlin Graduate School of Theology - Theological unit
- Ohio State University College of Dentistry - Medical unit
- Ohio Wesleyan University
- University of Cincinnati College of Medicine - Medical unit

=== Oklahoma ===
- University of Oklahoma
- University of Oklahoma College of Medicine - Medical unit

=== Oregon ===
- North Pacific College of Oregon - Medical/Dental unit
- University of Oregon Medical School - Medical unit
- Willamette University

=== Pennsylvania ===
- Bloomsburg University
- Bucknell University
- Franklin and Marshall College
- Hahnemann Medical College - Medical unit
- Jefferson Medical College - Medical unit
- Lancaster Theological Seminary - Theological unit
- Muhlenberg College
- Pennsylvania State University
- Pittsburgh-Xenia Theological Seminary - Theological unit
- Swarthmore College
- Temple University School of Medicine - Medical/Dental unit
- University of Pennsylvania
- University of Pittsburgh School of Dental Medicine - Dental unit
- University of Pittsburgh School of Medicine - Medical unit
- Ursinus College
- Villanova College

=== Rhode Island ===
- Brown University

=== South Carolina ===
- Medical College of South Carolina - Medical unit
- Newberry College
- University of South Carolina

=== South Dakota ===
- University of South Dakota

=== Tennessee ===
- Carson-Newman College
- Milligan College
- University of Tennessee College of Medicine - Medical/Dental unit
- University of the South
- Vanderbilt University - Theological unit
- Vanderbilt University School of Medicine - Medical unit

=== Texas ===
- Baylor University - Medical/Dental unit
- North Texas Agricultural College
- Rice Institute
- Southern Methodist University - Theological unit
- Southwestern Medical Foundation - Medical unit
- Southwestern University - Medical unit
- Texas Christian University - Theological unit
- University of Texas at Austin
- University of Texas at Houston - Dental unit

=== Utah ===
- University of Utah
- University of Utah College of Medicine - Medical unit

=== Vermont ===
- Middlebury College
- University of Vermont College of Medicine - Medical unit

=== Virginia ===
- Emory & Henry College
- Hampden-Sydney College
- Medical College of Virginia - Medical unit
- University of Richmond
- University of Virginia

=== Washington ===
- Gonzaga University
- University of Washington
- Whitman College

=== Washington D.C. ===
- George Washington University Medical School - Medical unit
- Georgetown University School of Medicine - Medical/Dental unit

=== West Virginia ===
- Bethany College
- West Virginia University

=== Wisconsin ===
- Lawrence College
- Marquette University
- Marquette University School of Dentistry - Dental unit
- Marquette University School of Medicine - Medical unit
- University of Wisconsin
