= David L. Petersen =

American theologian

David L. Petersen is the Franklin Nutting Parker Professor of Old Testament in the Candler School of Theology at Emory University. He is also an ordained Presbyterian minister.

Petersen received his Bachelor of Arts in 1965 from College of Wooster, a small Ohio liberal arts college affiliated with the Presbyterian Church. In 1968 he earned a Bachelors in Divinity at Yale University followed by a Masters in Philosophy in 1970 and a Ph.D. in 1972 from the same school.

Since that time he has specialized in Old Testament studies, particularly research on the Book of Genesis and the writings of the Hebrew Prophets. Petersen has written and co-authored numerous books and articles. He was the senior Old Testament editor for The New Interpreter's Study Bible and has served as president of the Society of Biblical Literature. He served as Old Testament editor on the new Common English Bible, published in 2011.

== Works ==
Dr. Petersen's writings include:

=== Books ===
- Petersen, David L. (1977). Late Israelite Prophecy. Society of Biblical Literature.
- ——— (1981). The Roles of Israel's Prophets. Almond Press.
- ——— (1984). Haggai and Zechariah 1-8. Westminster John Knox Press.
- ——— (1987). Prophecy in Ancient Israel. Fortress Press.
- ——— (1988). Canon, Theology, and Old Testament Interpretation. Fortress Press.
- ——— (1992). Interpreting Hebrew Poetry. Ausburg Fortress Publishers.
- ——— (1995). Zechariah 9-14 and Malachi. Presbyterian Publishing Corporation.
- ——— (2002). The Prophetic Literature: An Introduction. Westminster John Knox Press.
- ——— (2005). A Theological Introduction to the Old Testament. Abingdon Press.

=== As editor ===
- ———; Mays, James Luther; Richards, Kent Harold, eds. (1955). Old Testament Interpretation: past, present, and future: essays in honor of Gene M. Tucker. Nashville: Abingdon Press. ISBN 9780687138715. OCLC 1021306503.
- ———; Mays, James Luther; et al., eds. (2000). HarperCollins Bible Commentary. HarperOne. ISBN 9780060655488.
- ———; O'Day, Gail R., eds. (2009). Theological Bible Commentary. Louisville, KY: Westminster John Knox Press. ISBN 9781611640304. OCLC 810931688.
