= Charles Cousar =

American Presbyterian minister (1933–2014)

Charles Blanton Cousar (February 7, 1933 – December 10, 2014) was an American Presbyterian minister and professor of the New Testament at Columbia Theological Seminary. He was a writer and a New Testament scholar. Cousar was a recipient of the Alumni Distinguished Service Award from Columbia Theological Seminary.

== Education ==
Cousar was born on February 7, 1933 in Charlottesville, Virginia. He attended the McCallie School in Chattanooga, Tennessee. He graduated from Davidson College with a BA in 1955. He proceeded to study at the Columbia Theological Seminary and earned a BD in 1958. Cousar then obtained a Ph.D. from the University of Aberdeen, Scotland in 1960.

== Career ==
Cousar served as an assistant professor and an associate professor at Columbia Theological Seminary until 1966. He was the Samuel A. Cartledge Professor of the New Testament until 2003. He was also the dean of academic affairs, served twice as an interim dean of faculty and served twice as the interim president at Columbia Theological Seminary. From 1962 to 1968 he was a visiting professor at Agnes Scott College, and in 1969 at Union Theological Seminary. Since 1960 he has been a member of the Society of Biblical Literature.

== Death ==
Cousar died on December 10, 2024, at the age of 81.

== Awards and recognition ==
Cousar was a recipient of the Alumni Distinguished Service Award from Columbia Theological Seminary. He also received the Faculty Research Fellowship from the Association of Theological Schools, and the McCallie School Alumni Achievement Award.

== Major publications ==
Cousar is known for his New Testament research and commentaries. He also wrote part of the series Texts for Preaching, co-authored with a number of people including Walter Brueggemann. In addition to writing several books, he also published a number of scholarly articles and written sections for other larger books. His academic works include:

- The Letters of Paul: Interpreting Biblical Texts Series. Abingdon Press(Nov 1, 1996)
- Galatians (Interpretation: A Bible Commentary for Teaching & Preaching). Westminster John Knox Press (January 1, 1986). This is his most widely held work: according to WorldCat, the book is held in 664 libraries
- An Introduction to the New Testament: Witnesses to God's New Work. Westminster John Knox Press; annotated edition (September 19, 2006)
- Theology of the Cross: the death of Jesus in the Pauline letters (Overtures to Biblical Theology). Augsburg Fortress Publishing (May 1, 1990)
- Reading Galatians, Philippians, and 1 Thessalonians: A Literary and Theological Commentary (Reading the New Testament) (Volume 8). Smyth & Helwys Publishing, Incorporated (January 11, 2013).
- Philippians and Philemon: A Commentary. Westminster John Knox Press(April 2, 2009)
- Texts for Preaching, Year A: A Lectionary Commentary Based on the NRSV. Westminster John Knox Press (July 7, 1995)
- Texts for Preaching, Year B: A Lectionary Commentary Based on the NRSV. Westminster John Knox Press (July 7, 1995)
- Texts for Preaching, Year C: A Lectionary Commentary Based on the NRSV. Westminster John Knox Press (July 7, 1995)
