= Greek Bible =

Greek Bible may refer to:

- Bible translations into Greek
  - The Septuagint, a Greek translation of the Hebrew Bible (the Old Testament)
  - The Kaige revision, group of revisions to the Septuagint made in order to more closely align its translation with the proto-Masoretic Hebrew.
- The New Testament
- Greek Vulgate, a polysemic expression
- Textus Receptus, an edition of the Greek New Testament published by Desiderius Erasmus
- Patriarchal text, published in 1904 by the Ecumenical Patriarchate

== See also ==
- Greek Orthodox Church
- Bible translations into Greek
- Greek New Testament (disambiguation)
