= Sze-kar Wan =

Chinese-American New Testament scholar

Sze-kar Wan is a Chinese-American New Testament scholar.

== Biography ==
Wan was born in China and received his early education in Hong Kong. He moved to the United States when he was 15, received his AB from Brandeis University (1975), M.Div. from Gordon-Conwell Theological Seminary (1982), and his Th.D. from Harvard University Divinity School (1992). He taught New Testament at Andover Newton Theological School, before becoming Professor of New Testament at Perkins School of Theology, Southern Methodist University. He is ordained as a priest in the Episcopal Church and has been a member of the editorial board for the Journal of Biblical Literature.

Along with his work in New Testament studies and the use of the Bible in China, Wan is considered part of the first generation of scholars attempting to articulate a unique Asian American biblical hermeneutics, and is a founding member of the Ethnic Chinese Biblical Colloquium.

== Works ==
- Eber, Irene; Wan, Sze-kar; Walf, Knut, eds. (1999). Bible in Modern China: The Literary and Intellectual Impact. Monumenta Serica. ISBN 978-3-8050-0424-4.
- Wan, Sze-kar (2000). Power in Weakness: The Second Letter of Paul to the Corinthians. A&C Black. ISBN 978-1-56338-315-1.
- Wan, Sze-kar (2000). "Does Diaspora Identity Imply Some Sort of Universality? An Asian-American Reading of Galatians". In Segovia, Fernando F. (ed.). Interpreting Beyond Borders. Sheffield: Sheffield Press. pp. 107–131.
- Wan, Sze-kar (2006). "Betwixt and Between: Towards a Hermeneutics of Hyphenation". In Foskett, Mary; Kuan, Jeffrey Kah-Jin (eds.). Ways of Being, Ways of Reading: Asian-American Biblical Interpretation. St. Louis: Chalice Press. pp. 137–151.
- Wan, Sze-kar; Foskett, Mary F., eds. (2014). Diverse strands of a common thread : An introduction to ethnic Chinese Biblical interpretation. Hong Kong: Chinese University of Hong Kong.
- Wan, Sze-kar (2021). Romans: An Introduction and Study Guide: Empire and Resistance. Bloomsbury Publishing. ISBN 978-0-567-67504-0.
