= Greek New Testament =

Greek New Testament refers to the New Testament in Koine Greek. The autographs of all 27 books of the New Testament have been lost. However, there are numerous copies of New Testament manuscripts made mostly before the printing press was invented. In the early 16th century, collations and editions of the Greek New Testament began to be printed, notably by Erasmus.

It may also refer to the following printed texts:

- Novum Testamentum Graece, a modern critical edition of the Greek New Testament. This same title was used for critical editions of the New Testament for centuries and by several different editors. Also known as the Nestle-Aland. The modern version is often abbreviated as NA[##], with ## representing the edition number, i.e. NA28 for the 28th edition.
- The United Bible Societies (UBS) editions, modern critical editions of the Greek New Testament. The UBS5 edition uses the same text as the NA28.
- Editio Critica Maior, the modern editions of the Institute for New Testament Textual Research
- Novum Instrumentum omne and Novum Testamentum Omne, the Erasmus editions of the 16th century
- The Textus Receptus (the Received Text) refers to the numerous editions of the Greek New Testament based on the Majority Text
- The Greek column of the Complutensian Polyglot Bible, the first printed Greek New Testament
- Editio Octava Critica Maior, the Tischendorf editions of the 19th century and the basis for the modern Novum Testamentum Graece
- SBL Greek New Testament, the modern Society of Biblical Literature edition
- The New Testament in the Original Greek, the Westcott and Hort edition of the 19th century
- The Greek New Testament According to the Majority Text with Apparatus, a modern Majority Text edition
- Das Neue Testament, a 19th century edition of Bernhard Weiss used as a basis for modern ones
- Novum Testamentum Graece, a 19th century edition by Johann Scholz with new textual families noted
- Novum Testamentum Graecum editionis receptae cum lectionibus variantibus codicum manuscriptis, Johann Jakob Wettstein's New Testament based on Beza's
- Iesu Christo Domini Nostri Nouum Testamentum, Theodore Beza's New Testament used as the basis for the King James Bible and the Textus Receptus
- Editio Regia, the third edition of Stephanus' New Testament used as the basis for Beza's
- Ἡ Καινὴ Διαθήκη (or the Hē kainē diathēkē or Greek New Testament), the 1534 two-volume edition by Simon de Colines, an early attempt at a critical text prior to Stephanus, his stepson

== See also ==
- Development of the New Testament canon
- Textual criticism of the New Testament
- Textual variants in the New Testament
