= African American biblical hermeneutics =

Interpretation of the Christian Bible

African American biblical hermeneutics or African American biblical interpretation is the study of the interpretation of the Christian Bible, informed by African American history and experiences.

== History ==
Vincent L. Wimbush traces the history of African American biblical hermeneutics to the earliest encounters African Americans had with the Bible as a consequence of their forced enslavement and exportation from the African soil to the Americas, and the direct and indirect activities of Europeans to convert Africans. Hence, the Bible was perceived as the Book for Europeans to interpret, which in turn gave justification for European Christian domination. However, as African Americans began to claim Christianity as their own, African American biblical hermeneutics arose out of the experiences of racism in the United States. The discourse has been dominated by two core paradigmatic events in the Bible: the Exodus from Egypt and the ministry of Jesus. Both have been used to articulate God's concern for those under social and political bondage. For biblical scholars like Wimbush, Charles Copher, and Cain Hope Felder, they have advocated for a suspicion of Euro-American readings of the Bible which promote a pervasive Eurocentrism.

Since the 1988 publication of Renita J. Weems's Just a Sister Away, there has been a growing interest in a womanist approach to reading the Bible. While some have seen this as a derivative of feminist biblical hermeneutics, Nyasha Junior argues that it has "multiple sources, including U.S. women's activism, womanist scholarship in religion-related fields, and feminist biblical scholarship."

Others, such as Esau McCaulley, have argued that the discourse around African American biblical interpretation has been dominated by Black liberation theology between the 1920s to the 1960s. As such, this trajectory tends to overemphasize political liberation as the main concern of the Bible, while overlooking conversionistic and holiness strands that can be found in the pulpits. Hence, McCaulley advocates for a recovery of what he calls "Black ecclesial interpretation."

== See also ==
- Asian American biblical hermeneutics
- Exodus narrative in Antebellum America
