= Arthur F. Whittem =

American academic administrator (1879–1958)

Arthur Fisher Whittem
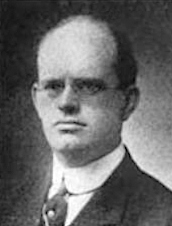
- Born: July 21, 1879; Boston, Massachusetts
- Died: February 13, 1958 (aged 78); Cambridge, Massachusetts
- Education: Harvard College
- Occupation: Academic administrator
- Spouse: Ellen Alden Huntington (m. 1912)
- Children: 2

Arthur Fisher Whittem (July 21, 1879 – February 13, 1958) was the Chairman of Commission on Extension Courses and Director of the University Extension at Harvard University from 1922 to 1946. He was the second person to hold the position.

== Biography ==
Arthur Fisher Whittem was born in Boston on July 21, 1879. He graduated from Harvard College in 1902 and served as a professor of Romance languages and as director of the Harvard Summer School before becoming dean.

He married Ellen Alden Huntington on December 21, 1912, and they had two children.

He died in Cambridge, Massachusetts on February 13, 1958.

== Works cited ==
- Shinagel, Michael (2010). The Gates Unbarred: A History of University Extension at Harvard, 1910 - 2009. Harvard University Press. ISBN 978-0674051355.

Academic offices
Preceded by James Hardy Ropes	Dean of the Harvard Extension School; 1922 - 1946	Succeeded by George W. Adams
