= John L. McKenzie =

Roman Catholic theologian (1910–1991)

- Born: John Lawrence McKenzie; 9 October 1910; Brazil
- Died: 2 March 1991
- Occupations: Theologian, university teacher, writer
- Employers: DePaul University; Loyola University Chicago; Seton Hall University; University of Chicago; University of Notre Dame

John Lawrence McKenzie (1910–1991) was an American Catholic biblical scholar.

== Biography ==
McKenzie was born on October 9, 1910, in Brazil, Indiana, the first of the six children of Myra (Daly) and Harry McKenzie. John McKenzie became the premier Catholic biblical scholar of the mid-twentieth century; indeed, John Courtney Murray wrote that John McKenzie was "the best Catholic theologian he knew of in the United States."

John McKenzie was interested in the Jesuits from an early age. At some significant sacrifice to his family, he was enrolled in a Jesuit boarding high school in St. Mary's, Kansas, where he came first in his class three out of his four years there. After graduating in 1928, he entered the Chicago Province of the Society of Jesus and was ordained a priest in 1939. He was supposed to study theology in Rome, but the onset of World War II made that impossible. Consequently, he and others were required to study instead at the Weston School of Theology in Massachusetts (now the Boston College School of Theology and Ministry). He received his Doctorate in Sacred Theology from Weston.

John McKenzie taught for nineteen years at the Jesuit Theologate in West Baden, Indiana, before transferring to Loyola University Chicago. He left Loyola to become the first Catholic Faculty member at the University of Chicago Divinity School. Following this, he taught at the University of Notre Dame, at Seton Hall University, and at DePaul University.

His 900,000-word Dictionary of the Bible remains the most frequently used single-volume biblical dictionary available. At the time of its publication in 1956, a review in the periodical The Thomist called McKenzie's The Two-Edged Sword "the most significant Catholic interpretation of the Old Testament ever written in English." The New York Times obituary announcing his death said, “Rev. John L. McKenzie was a pioneering and outspoken Roman Catholic biblical scholar, (who) through scholarly and popular writings, helped bring about the general acceptance by Catholic scholars and Church authorities of the scientific techniques of investigating Scripture, which had been highly suspect in Catholic circles when he began his career.” In 1965 and 1966 he also published The Power and the Wisdom, an interpretation of the New Testament; Authority in the Church, a book arguing that service—diakonia—rather than secular models of government—domination—should define the Church's understanding and use of authority; a seminal essay on natural law in the New Testament, as well as eleven other articles and nineteen book reviews of scholarly works. He is the author of a number of articles in the Encyclopædia Britannica (14th edition): Adam and Eve, Hexateuch, Israel, Mizpah, Pentateuch, Zephania, and Zion.

From approximately 1954 to 1974 he was considered the dean of Catholic biblical scholars. During this period, he was elected President of the Catholic Biblical Association and became the first Catholic ever elected President of the Society of Biblical Literature. During this period he was also President of probably the largest Anti-Vietnam War organization, Clergy and Laity Concerned, whose founding members also included the Reverend Martin Luther King Jr., Rabbi Abraham Heschel, and Reverend William Sloane Coffin. This involvement was the direct result of his being an outspoken and supremely articulate Christian pacifist. In 1971, he transferred as a priest from the Society of Jesus to the Roman Catholic Diocese of Madison, Wisconsin.

Testimonials to his work include a comment by Dorothy Day, who wrote in her diary, "Up at 5:00 and reading The Power and The Wisdom. I thank God for sending me men with such insight as Fr. McKenzie."

John L. McKenzie died in Claremont, on March 2, 1991.

== Works ==
- Authority in the Church. 1966. Reprinted, John L. McKenzie Reprint Series. Eugene, OR: Wipf & Stock, 2009.
- The Civilization of Christianity. 1986. Reprinted, John L. McKenzie Reprint Series. Eugene, OR: Wipf & Stock, 2009.
- Commentary on the Gospel according to Matthew. 1981. Reprinted, John L. McKenzie Reprint Series. Eugene, OR: Wipf & Stock, 2015.
- Dictionary of the Bible. Milwaukee: Bruce, 1965.
- Did I Say That? A Theologian Confronts the Hard Questions. 1973. Reprinted, John L. McKenzie Reprint Series. Eugene, OR: Wipf & Stock, 2009.
- How Relevant Is the Bible? And Other Commentaries on Scripture. 1981. Reprinted, John L. McKenzie Reprint Series. Eugene, OR: Wipf & Stock, 2009.
- Light on the Epistles: A Reader's Guide. 1975. Reprinted, John L. McKenzie Reprint Series. Eugene, OR: Wipf & Stock, 2009.
- Light on the Gospels A Reader's Guide. 1976. Reprinted, John L. McKenzie Reprint Series. Eugene, OR: Wipf & Stock, 2009.
- Mastering the Meaning of the Bible. 1966. Reprinted, John L. McKenzie Reprint Series. Eugene, OR: Wipf & Stock, 2009.
- Myths and Realities: Studies in Biblical Theology. 1963. Reprinted, John L. McKenzie Reprint Series. Eugene, OR: Wipf & Stock, 2009.
- The New Testament Without Illusion. 1980. Reprinted, John L. McKenzie Reprint Series. Eugene, OR: Wipf & Stock, 2009.
- The Old Testament Without Illusions. 1979. Reprinted, John L. McKenzie Reprint Series. Eugene, OR: Wipf & Stock, 2009.
- The Power and the Wisdom: An Interpretation of the New Testament. 1965. Reprinted, John L. McKenzie Reprint Series. Eugene, OR: Wipf & Stock, 2009.
- Second Isaiah. Anchor Bible 20. 1968. Reprinted, New Haven: Yale University Press, 2007.
- Source: What the Bible Says About the Problems of Contemporary Life. 1984. Reprinted, John L. McKenzie Reprint Series. Eugene, OR: Wipf & Stock, 2009.
- A Theology of the Old Testament. 1976. Reprinted, John L. McKenzie Reprint Series. Eugene, OR: Wipf & Stock, 2009.
- The Two-Edged Sword: An Interpretation of the Old Testament. 1956. Reprinted, John L. McKenzie Reprint Series. Eugene, OR: Wipf & Stock, 2009.
- The World of the Judges. Prentice-Hall Backgrounds to the Bible Series. Englewood Cliffs, NJ: Prentice-Hall, 1966.
