= Adele Reinhartz =

Canadian academic (born 1953)

Adele Reinhartz FRSC
- Born: 1953 (age 72–73); Canada

Academic background
- Education: University of Toronto; McMaster University
- Doctoral advisor: E. P. Sanders

Academic work
- Discipline: Biblical studies; religious studies
- Institutions: University of Toronto; McMaster University; Wilfrid Laurier University; University of Ottawa
- Website: adelereinhartz.com

Adele Reinhartz FRSC (born 1953) is a Canadian academic and a specialist in the history and literature of Christianity and Judaism in the Greco-Roman period, the Gospel of John, early Jewish–Christian relations, literary criticism including feminist literary criticism, feminist exegesis, and the impact of the Bible on popular cinema and television.

== Education ==
In 1975 Reinhartz received her Bachelor of Arts degree in religious studies from the University of Toronto, in 1977 her Master of Arts degree, and in 1983 her Doctor of Philosophy degree in religious studies from McMaster University.

== Work ==
Reinhartz joined the McMaster faculty in 1987. She was dean of graduate studies and research at Wilfrid Laurier University before being appointed associate vice-president, research, at University of Ottawa in 2005.

In 1997–1998 she was the Canadian Society of Biblical Studies president, and in 2005 she was made a fellow of the Royal Society of Canada.

In 2015, she was appointed the 2015-2016 Corcoran Visiting Chair in Christian-Jewish Relations at the Center for Christian-Jewish Learning at Boston College.

Reinhartz was the editor of the Journal of Biblical Literature until December 31, 2018.

== Books ==
- 1992 The Word in the World: The Cosmological Tale in the Fourth Gospel (ISBN 1-55540-799-4)
- 1998 Why Ask My Name? Anonymity and Identity in Biblical Narrative (ISBN 0-19-509970-2)
- 2001 Befriending the Beloved Disciple: A Jewish Reading of the Gospel of John (ISBN 0-8264-1446-X), winner the 2003 F. W. Beare Award for Outstanding Book in Christian Origins, Canadian Society of Biblical Studies
- 2002 Jesus, Judaism, and Christian Anti-Judaism: Reading the New Testament After the Holocaust. Editor with Paula Fredriksen. (ISBN 978-0-664-22328-1)
- 2003 Scripture on the Silver Screen (ISBN 0-664-22359-1), a study of contemporary films that make use of the Bible,
- 2007 Jesus of Hollywood (ISBN 0-19-514696-4), about films featuring Jesus
- 2011 Caiaphas the High Priest: Studies on Personalities of the New Testament ISBN 9781570039461
- 2018 Cast Out of the Covenant: Jews and Anti-Judaism in the Gospel of John ISBN 9781978701175

Professional and academic associations
Preceded by Gale A. Yee	President of the Society of Biblical Literature; 2020–present	Incumbent
