= New Interpreter's Dictionary of the Bible =

The New Interpreter's Dictionary of the Bible is a five volume dictionary of the Bible. The volumes were released by Abingdon Press from 2006 to 2009. This work contains 8,400 articles written by 900 scholars from forty countries. The general editor is Katharine Doob Sakenfeld, Professor of Old Testament at Princeton Theological Seminary in Princeton, US. According to Professor Sakenfeld, the purpose of this work is to provide "scholarship in the service of the church."

== Volumes ==
Volume 1 : A–C
Volume 2 : D–H
Volume 3 : I–Ma
Volume 4 : Me–R
Volume 5 : S–Z
