= Choon-Leong Seow =

Singaporean biblical scholar

Choon-Leong Seow (Chinese: 蕭俊良; pinyin: Xiāo Jùnliáng; born August 4, 1952), known as C. L. Seow, is a Singaporean biblical scholar, Semitist, epigrapher, and historian of Near Eastern religion. An expert in wisdom literature, Seow has written widely in the field of biblical studies.

== Education ==
Born and raised in Singapore, Seow holds a Bachelor of Arts from Pepperdine University, a Master of Divinity from Princeton Theological Seminary, and a Doctor of Philosophy in Near Eastern Languages and Civilizations from Harvard University. His teachers include Patrick D. Miller, Jimmy Jack McBee Roberts, Thomas Oden Lambdin, and – for his dissertation – Frank Moore Cross.

== Career ==
Seow began teaching at Princeton Theological Seminary in 1983, earning the rank of associate professor in 1990 and occupying the newly established Henry Snyder Gehman Chair in 1995. Twenty years later, in 2015, he transitioned to Vanderbilt University as Vanderbilt, Buffington, Cupples Chair in Divinity and Distinguished Professor of Hebrew Bible. In addition, Seow has taught at Princeton University, the Jewish Theological Seminary of America, Harvard University, and institutions in Hong Kong, Singapore, Malaysia and South Africa.

Seow has written on a broad range of topics related to the study of the Bible, including wisdom literature, the history of ancient Israelite religion, Northwest Semitic philology, Hebrew poetry and the theological interpretation of the Bible. Much of Seow's recent work has focused on the “history of consequences,” which examines how the Bible has been interpreted throughout history and the impact of those interpretations.

To date, Seow has published seven book-length works, including commentaries on Job, Daniel, I-II Kings, and Ecclesiasties. He has also published over forty scholarly articles and essays. He is the main editor for Hebrew Bible/Old Testament for the Encyclopedia of the Bible and Its Reception (de Gruyter) and the general editor of the Illuminations commentary series (Eerdmans). He has served on the editorial boards of numerous publications, including the Beihefte zur Zeitschrift für die alttestamentliche Wissenschaft series (de Gruyter), Maarav, Catholic Biblical Quarterly, Journal of Biblical Literature, the Writings from the Ancient World series (SBL Press), and the Abingdon Old Testament Commentary Series.

== Selected works ==
- Job 1-21 (Illuminations). Eerdmans, 2013.
- Hebrew Inscriptions: Texts from the Biblical Period of the Monarchy (Co-written with F.W. Dobbs-Allsopp, Jimmy Jack McBee Roberts, R. E. Whitaker). Yale University Press, 2004.
- Daniel (Westminster Bible Companion). Westminster/John Knox, 2003.
- “I & II Kings” in New Interpreter's Bible, Volume III (Abingdon, 1999, 1–296).
- Ecclesiastes: A New Translation with Introduction and Commentary (Anchor Bible 18c). Yale University Press, 1997.
- A Grammar for Biblical Hebrew. Second edition: Abingdon, 1995; First edition: Abingdon, 1987. Translated into Chinese in Taiwan (2001) and China (2007).
- Myth, Drama, and the Politics of David's Dance (Harvard Semitic Monograph 46). Scholars Press, 1989.
