= Vincent L. Wimbush =

American New Testament scholar (fl. 20th–21st centuries)

Vincent Lee Wimbush is an American New Testament scholar, known for his work in African American biblical hermeneutics.

== Biography ==
Wimbush received a BA in philosophy from Morehouse College (1975), an M.Div. (1978) from Yale Divinity School, and an AM (1981) and Ph.D. (1983) from Harvard University in the study of religions, with a focus on the New Testament. He taught at a number of institutions, including Union Theological Seminary (1991–2003) and Claremont Graduate University (2003–2014). He is the founding director of the Institute for Signifying Scriptures.

In 2010, Wimbush was the president of the Society of Biblical Literature.

== African American biblical hermeneutics ==
Wimbush is a pioneer in the field of African American biblical hermeneutics. He has argued for a need to challenge a Eurocentric understanding of biblical studies. Instead, scholars are to refocus the discipline within the context of North America, with a particular emphasis on the African-American experience. This would result in a hermeneutic that is much more informed by "marginality, liminality, exile, pain, trauma."

== Works ==
- Vaage, Leif E.; Wimbush, Vincent L., eds. (2002). Asceticism and the New Testament. Routledge. ISBN 978-1-135-96224-1.
- Wimbush, Vincent L. (2003). The Bible and African Americans: A Brief History. Fortress Press. ISBN 978-1-4514-1944-3.
- Wimbush, Vincent L. (2008). Theorizing Scriptures: New Critical Orientations to a Cultural Phenomenon. Rutgers University Press. ISBN 978-0-8135-4203-4.
- Wimbush, Vincent L. (2012). Paul, the Worldly Ascetic: Response to the World and Self-Understanding according to I Corinthians 7. Wipf and Stock Publishers. ISBN 978-1-61097-963-4.
- Wimbush, Vincent L. (2014). White Men's Magic: Scripturalization as Slavery. Oxford University Press. ISBN 978-0-19-934439-0.
