= Lucetta Mowry =

American biblical scholar and archaeologist

Professor Emerita Lucetta Mowry
- Born: Mary Lucetta Mowry; 1913; Pyongyang, Korea, Empire of Japan
- Died: February 23, 2004; Randallstown, Maryland

Academic work
- Discipline: Biblical studies
- Sub-discipline: New Testament studies

Mary Lucetta Mowry (1913 – 23 February 2004) was an American biblical scholar and archaeologist. Mowry was a professor emeritus of religion at Wellesley College and a member of the translation team for the New Revised Standard Version Bible.

== Early life and education ==
Mowry was born in Pyongyang in 1913 to Presbyterian missionaries. She received her undergraduate degree at Wilson College, and a master's degree at the Presbyterian College of Christian Education. She then studied at Yale University, where she received a bachelor of divinity in 1940 and a doctorate in 1946.

== Career ==
Mowry was a professor and dean of academics at Wellesley College, retiring in 1981. At Wellesley, she held the Andrew W. Mellon emeritus professorship in the humanities.

As an archaeologist, Mowry was involved in excavations in Libya and Jordan. She was the American School of Oriental Research's first female associate trustee.

Mowry was a member of the interdenominational committee of translators for the New Revised Standard Version. She was a member of the team responsible for translating the Gospel of John and the Johannine epistles.

== Selected works ==
=== Books ===
- Mowry, Lucetta (1962). The Dead Sea Scrolls and the Early Church. Notre Dame, Indiana: University of Notre Dame Press. ISBN 9780608095646.
