= Esau McCaulley =

American biblical scholar

The Reverend Canon Esau McCaulley
- Born: 1979 (age 46–47)
- Spouse: Mandy
- Children: 4

Ecclesiastical career
- Religion: Christian (Anglican)
- Church: Anglican Church in North America
- Ordained: Deacon; priest

Academic background
- Education: University of the South (B.A.); Gordon–Conwell Theological Seminary (M.Div.); Nashotah House Theological Seminary (S.T.M.); University of St. Andrews (Ph.D.)
- Thesis: Sharing in the Son’s Inheritance: Davidic Messianism and Paul’s Worldwide Interpretation of the Abrahamic Land Promise in Galatians (2017)
- Doctoral advisor: N. T. Wright

Academic work
- Discipline: Theology
- Sub-discipline: Biblical studies, Biblical theology, Biblical hermeneutics
- School or tradition: Evangelical Anglicanism
- Institutions: Wheaton College (Illinois)
- Notable works: Sharing in the Son’s Inheritance (2019); Reading While Black (2020); How Far to the Promised Land (2023)
- Website: https://esaumccaulley.com/

Esau McCaulley (born 1979) is an American biblical scholar and Jonathan Blanchard Associate Professor of New Testament at Wheaton College, Illinois, canon theologian for the Anglican Diocese of Churches for the Sake of Others, as well as a theologian-in-residence at Progressive Baptist Church, a historically black congregation in Chicago.

== Biography ==
McCaulley majored in history at the University of the South matriculating in 1998 and graduating with the Bachelor of Arts in 2002. He earned a Master of Divinity at Gordon Conwell Theological Seminary, graduating in 2005. He also pursued a Master of Sacred Theology at Nashotah House between 2008 and 2012. He completed his Doctor of Philosophy degree in New Testament in 2017 at the University of St Andrews, supervised by N.T. Wright.

Since 2019, McCaulley has been assistant professor of New Testament at Wheaton College. He was ordained in the Anglican Church in North America (ACNA). He is a contributing writer on several outlets such as Christianity Today, The Washington Post, and The New York Times.

His first book, Sharing in the Son's Inheritance, based on his dissertation, is a study on the book of Galatians which explores the link between Paul's understanding of Jesus as Davidic Messiah and a view that the Abrahamic land promise encompasses the whole earth. His second book, Reading While Black, advocates for what he terms a "Black ecclesial interpretation" of the Bible based on the experiences and the cultural perspectives of the African American community. It is less about promoting a different meaning of the text of the Bible, as it is saying that the reader's experiences shape different questions for the Bible which render new insights.

In 2020, McCaulley received the "Emerging Public Intellectual Award" from Redeemer University. His Reading While Black won the 2021 Christianity Today book award, under the category "Beautiful Orthodoxy."

== Personal life ==
McCaulley is a military spouse and is married to Mandy, a pediatrician and Navy reservist. Together they have four children.

== Works ==
- The New Testament in Color: A Multiethnic Bible Commentary. Downers Grove, IL: InterVarsity Press Academic. 2024. ISBN 978-0830814091.
- Josey Johnson's Hair and the Holy Spirit. Downers Grove, IL: IVP Kids, 2022. ISBN 978-1-5140-0357-2
- Reading While Black: African American Biblical Interpretation as an Exercise in Hope. Downers Grove, IL: IVP, 2020. ISBN 978-0-83085487-5
- Sharing in the Son's Inheritance: Davidic Messianism and Paul's Worldwide Interpretation of the Abrahamic Land Promise in Galatians. London, UK: T & T Clark, 2019. ISBN 978-0-56768592-6
