= Jouette Bassler =

American biblical scholar

Jouette M. Bassler is an American biblical scholar in Pauline theology who is Professor Emeritus of New Testament at Perkins School of Theology, Southern Methodist University.

== Early life and education ==
Born Jouette McCurdy, Bassler initially trained in chemistry, earning both a BA and an MA from Rice University before turning to biblical studies. She completed her PhD in New Testament studies at Yale University in 1982. Her doctoral dissertation, Divine Impartiality: Paul and a Theological Axiom, was supervised by Nils A. Dahl. Bassler explored the concept of divine impartiality as a key theological principle in Pauline thought. The work laid a foundation for her later scholarship on Pauline theology.

== Career ==
In 1979, Bassler was elected a member of the Catholic Biblical Association of America. She has written a number of books and served as general editor of the Journal of Biblical Literature from 1995 to 1999. She also served as New Testament editor for the HarperCollins Study Bible. Her 1994 article on the Pastoral Epistles has been "extremely influential in feminist interpretations." In 2007, a festschrift of nineteen essays was published in her honor.

== Selected works ==
=== Books ===
- Bassler, Jouette M. (1982). Divine Impartiality: Paul and a Theological Axiom. Society of Biblical Literature - Dissertation series. Vol. 59. Chico, CA: Scholars Press. ISBN 9780891304753. OCLC 7283855.
- ——— (1991). God & Mammon: Asking for Money in the New Testament. Nashville, TN: Abingdon Press. ISBN 9780687149629. OCLC 480394006.
- ——— (1996). 1 Timothy, 2 Timothy, Titus. Abingdon New Testament Commentaries. Nashville, TN: Abingdon Press. ISBN 9780687001576. OCLC 462324014.
- ——— (2007). Navigating Paul: An Introduction to Key Theological Concepts. Louisville, KY: Westminster John Knox Press. ISBN 9780664227418. OCLC 70259070.

=== Edited by ===
- ———, ed. (1991). Pauline Theology, volume I: Thessalonians, Philippians, Galatians, Philemon. Minneapolis, MN: Fortress Press. ISBN 9780800624880. OCLC 909245641.

=== Chapters ===
- ——— (2002). "Paul's theology: whence and whither?". In Hay, David M. (ed.). Pauline Theology: 1 and 2 Corinthians. Minneapolis, MN: Fortress Press. pp. 3–17. ISBN 9780800624897. OCLC 669693778.

=== Journal articles ===
- ——— (April 1981). "The Galileans: A Neglected Factor in Johannine Community Research". The Catholic Biblical Quarterly. 43 (2): 243–257.
- ——— (January 1984). "Divine Impartiality in Paul's Letter to the Romans". Novum Testamentum. 26 (1): 43–58. doi:10.1163/156853684X00103.
- ——— (March 1984). "The Widows' Tale: A Fresh Look at 1 Tim 5:3-16". Journal of Biblical Literature. 103 (1): 23–41. doi:10.2307/3260312. JSTOR 3260312.
- ——— (1985). "Luke and Paul on Impartiality". Biblica. 66 (4): 546–552.
- ——— (November 1985). "Philo on Joseph: The Basic Coherence of "De Iosepho" and "De Somniis ii"". Journal for the Study of Judaism in the Persian, Hellenistic, and Roman Period. 16 (2): 240–255. doi:10.1163/157006385X00357.
- ——— (1989). "Mixed Signals: Nicodemus in the Fourth Gospel". Journal of Biblical Literature. 108 (4): 635–646. doi:10.2307/3267184. JSTOR 3267184.
