= Walter Brueggemann =

American Protestant Old Testament scholar and theologian (1933–2025)

The Reverend Doctor Walter Brueggemann
- Born: March 11, 1933; Tilden, Nebraska, U.S.
- Died: June 5, 2025 (aged 92); Traverse City, Michigan, U.S.
- Education: Elmhurst College, Eden Theological Seminary, Union Theological Seminary, Saint Louis University
- Occupation: Professor of Theology

Ecclesiastical career
- Ordained: United Church of Christ
- Writings: Over one hundred books, dozens of scholarly articles, largely on rhetorical criticism
- Offices held: Professor of Theology, Eden Theological Seminary (1961-1986); Professor of Theology, Columbia Theological Seminary (1986-2003); William Marcellus McPheeters Professor Emeritus of Old Testament, Columbia Theological Seminary (2003-2025)
- Website: www.walterbrueggemann.com

Walter Albert Brueggemann (March 11, 1933 – June 5, 2025) was an American Christian scholar and theologian who is widely considered an influential Old Testament scholar. His work often focused on the Hebrew prophetic tradition and the sociopolitical imagination of the Church. He argued that the Church must provide a counter-narrative to the dominant forces of consumerism, militarism, and nationalism.

== Career ==
Walter Albert Brueggemann was born in Tilden, Nebraska, on March 11, 1933, the son of a minister of the German Evangelical Synod of North America. The family moved frequently throughout the Midwestern United States because of his father's work, before settling in Blackburn, Missouri. He received an A.B. from Elmhurst College (1955), a B.D. from Eden Theological Seminary (1958), a Th.D. from Union Theological Seminary, New York (1961), and Ph.D. from Saint Louis University (in 1974). He was ordained in the United Church of Christ in 1958.

He was professor of Old Testament (1961–1986) and Dean (1968–1982) at Eden Theological Seminary. Beginning in 1986, he served as William Marcellus McPheeters professor of Old Testament at Columbia Theological Seminary, from which he retired in the early 2000s. Until his death, Brueggemann lived in Traverse City, Michigan. He and Erskine Clarke were the founding editors for Journal for Preachers for more than 40 years, and the Pentecost 2022 edition marked his transition from Editor to Editor Emeritus. The current editor is Theodore Wardlaw.

== Thought ==
Brueggemann was an advocate and practitioner of rhetorical criticism. He wrote more than 58 books, hundreds of articles, and several commentaries on books of the Bible. He was also a contributor to a number of the Living the Questions DVD programs and was featured in the program "Countering Pharaoh's Production-Consumption Society Today." Brueggemann participated in Bill Moyers' 1990s PBS television series on Genesis (documented in Genesis: A Living Conversation. Main Street Books, 1997. ISBN 0-385-49043-7).

Originally a strong supporter of modern-day Israel and its biblical claims, Brueggemann later repudiated Israel for what he believed to be its exploitation of "ancient promises" to create a "toxic ideology," and then affirmed his belief that it was not anti-Semitic to stand up for justice for Palestinians.

Brueggemann was known throughout the world for his method of combining literary and sociological modes when reading the Bible. V. S. Parrish categorized Brueggemann as being an exegete and theologian. As an exegete he composed several commentaries (Genesis, Exodus, Deuteronomy, 1 and 2 Samuel, Isaiah, and Jeremiah). His most notable work was on the book of Psalms, and he wrote many monographs and articles on specific portions of the Hebrew Bible. For example, he believed that lament is lacking in current religious faith and practice with detrimental results.

As a theologian, Brueggemann was an editor for the Fortress Press series "Overtures to Biblical Theology". His development of Old Testament theological methods consists of literary mode, social function, and dialectical approach. Titles such as "David's Truth in Israel's Imagination and Memory" (1985), "Power, Providence and Personality" (1990), "1 Kings and 2 Kings" (1982c), "The Prophetic Imagination" (1978), and "Hopeful Imagination" (1986) reflect his interest in the prophetic corpus.

== Personal life and death ==
Brueggemann married Mary Bonner Miller in 1960; they had two sons. They divorced in 2005.

From 2011 until his death in 2025 he was married to Tia Ehrhardt Brueggemann. Brueggemann died at a hospice in Traverse City, Michigan, on June 5, 2025, at the age of 92.

== Honors ==
Among his honors are:

- LL.D., DePauw University, 1984
- D.D., Virginia Theological Seminary, 1988
- D.H.Litt., Doane College, 1990
- D.D., Jesuit School of Theology, 1993
- D.Litt., Colgate University, 1997
- D.H.Litt., Elmhurst College, 1997
- D.D., Huron University College, 2014

There is also a festschrift in his honor: God in the Fray: A Tribute to Walter Brueggemann (eds. Tod Linafelt and Timothy Beal, Minneapolis: Fortress Press).

== Publications ==
- Abiding Astonishment: Psalms, Modernity, and the Making of History. Westminster John Knox Press. 1991. ISBN 978-0-664-25134-5.
- Advent/Christmas; Proclamation 3: Aids for Interpreting the Lessons of the Church Year, Series B. Edited by Elizabeth Achtemeier. Fortress Press, 1984. ISBN 9780800641016
- An Unsettling God: The Heart of the Hebrew Bible. Augsburg Fortress, Publishers. 2009. ISBN 978-1-4514-1953-5.
- Awed to Heaven, Rooted in Earth: Prayers of Walter Brueggemann. Fortress Press. December 1, 2002. ISBN 978-1-4514-1954-2.
- Belonging and Growing in the Christian Community. Edited by Elizabeth McWhorter. General Assembly Mission Board, Presbyterian Church in the United States, 1979.
- The Bible Makes Sense. St Mary's College Press, 1977.
  - ---. 2d ed. Franciscan Media, 2003, ISBN 9780867165586
- Biblical Perspectives on Evangelism: Living in a Three-Storied Universe. Abingdon Press. July 1, 2011. ISBN 978-1-4267-2214-1.
- "The Book of Exodus". In The New Interpreter's Bible. Vol. 1. Nashville: Abingdon Press, 1994. ISBN.
- The Book That Breathes New Life: Scriptural Authority and Biblical Theology. 2005. ISBN.
  - The Book that Breathes New Life: Scriptural Authority and Biblical Theology. Fortress Press. January 1, 2011. pp. 171–. ISBN 978-1-4514-1955-9.
- Cadences of Home: Preaching Among Exiles. Westminster John Knox Press. 1997. ISBN 978-0-664-25749-1.
- The Collected Sermons of Walter Brueggemann. Westminster John Knox Press. 2011. ISBN 978-0-664-23445-4.
- A Commentary on Jeremiah: Exile and Homecoming. Wm. B. Eerdmans Publishing. January 1998. ISBN 978-0-8028-0280-4.
- Confirming Our Faith, Chapters 4,5,7,8,9,18; edited by Larry E Kalp. United Church Press, 1980.
- Confronting the Bible: A Resource and Discussion Book for Youth. United Church Press, 1968.
- The Creative Word: Canon as a Model for Biblical Education. Fortress Press. January 1, 1982. ISBN 978-1-4514-1957-3.
- David's Truth in Israel's Imagination and Memory. Fortress Press. ISBN 978-1-4514-1958-0.
  - ---. 2d ed. Minneapolis: Fortress Press, 2002. ISBN.
- Deuteronomy: Abingdon Old Testament Commentaries. Abingdon Press, 2001. ISBN.
- Divine Presence amid Violence: Contextualizing the Book of Joshua. Cascade Books, 2009. ISBN 978-1-60608-089-4.
- Easter; Proclamation 4 (Series A). Fortress Press, 1989.
- Ethos and Ecumenism: The History of Eden Theological Seminary, 1925-1970. Eden Publishing House, 1975.
- The Evangelical Catechism Revisited, 1847-1972. Eden Publishing House, 1972.
- Fatal Embrace: Christians, Jews, and the Search for Peace in the Holy Land. Synergy Books, 2010. ISBN 978-0-9840760-7-9. Foreword to the book by Mark Braverman.
- Finally Comes the Poet: Daring Speech for Proclamation. Fortress Press. January 1, 1989. ISBN 978-1-4514-1961-0.
- First and Second Samuel. Westminster John Knox Press. 1990. ISBN 978-0-664-23741-7.
- I Kings (Knox Preaching Guides). Edited by John H Hayes. John Knox Press, 1982. ISBN 9780804232128
- II Kings (Knox Preaching Guides). Edited by John H Hayes. John Knox Press, 1982.
- 1 & 2 Kings: Smyth & Helwys Bible Commentary. Smyth & Helwys Publishing, 2000. ISBN 9781573120654
- Genesis. Westminster John Knox Press. 1982. ISBN 978-0-664-23733-2.
- Hope Within History. Westminster John Knox Press. 1987. ISBN 978-0-8042-0918-2.
- Hopeful Imagination: Prophetic Voices in Exile. Fortress Press. January 1, 1986. ISBN 978-1-4514-1962-7.
- In Man We Trust: The Neglected Side of Biblical Faith. John Knox Press, 1972. ISBN 0-8042-0199-4.
- Interpretation and Obedience: From Faithful Reading to Faithful Living. Fortress Press. January 1, 1991. ISBN 978-0-8006-2478-1.
- Brueggeman1, Linafelt2, Walter1, Linafelt2 (2021). An Introduction to the Old Testament: The Canon and Christian Imagination (3rd ed.). Lousiville: Westminster John Knox Press. ISBN 9780664264413.
- Isaiah: 1-39. Westminster John Knox Press. 1998. ISBN 978-0-664-25524-4.
- Isaiah: 40-66. Westminster John Knox Press. 1998. ISBN 978-0-664-25791-0.
- Israel's Praise: Doxology Against Idolatry and Ideology. Fortress Press. 1988. ISBN 978-1-4514-1965-8.
- With George R Beasley-Murray, Jeremiah: Faithfulness in the Midst of Fickleness. The Newell Lectureships II edited by Timothy Dwyer. Warner Press, Inc, 1993.
- Journey to the Common Good. Westminster John Knox Press. January 1, 2010. ISBN 978-1-61164-008-3.
- The Land: Place as Gift, Promise, and Challenge in Biblical Faith. Fortress Press, 1977,
  - ---. 2d ed. Overtures to Biblical Theology. Fortress Press, 2002. ISBN 978-0-8006-3462-9.
- Living toward a Vision: Biblical Reflections on Shalom. United Church Press, 1976, 1982. ISBN 9780829806137
- Mandate to Difference: An Invitation to the Contemporary Church. Westminster John Knox Press, 2007. ISBN 978-0-664-23121-7
- Many Voices, One God: Being Faithful in a Pluralistic World. Co-Edited with George Stroup Louisville, Kentucky: Westminster John Knox Press, 1998.
- The Message of the Psalms: A Theological Commentary. Augsburg Publishing House. 1984. ISBN 0-8066-2120-6.
- Old Testament Theology: An Introduction. Abingdon Press. September 1, 2010. ISBN 978-1-4267-2340-7.
- Patrick D Miller, ed. (1992). Old Testament Theology: Essays on Structure, Theme, and Text. Fortress Press. ISBN 978-1-4514-1969-6.
- Out of Babylon. Abingdon Press. 2010. ISBN 978-1-4267-1005-6.
- Peace (ubt Series). Chalice Press. 2001. ISBN 978-0-8272-3024-8.
- Power, Providence, and Personality: Biblical Insight Into Life and Ministry. Westminster John Knox Press. 1990. ISBN 978-0-664-25138-3.
- Prayers for a Privileged People. Abingdon Press. March 1, 2010. ISBN 978-1-4267-1370-5.
- Praying the Psalms. St Mary's College Press, 1982.
  - Praying the Psalms, Second Edition: Engaging Scripture and the Life of the Spirit. Wipf and Stock Publishers. May 1, 2007. ISBN 978-1-55635-283-6.
- The Prophetic Imagination. Minneapolis: Fortress Press, 1978. ISBN.
  - The Prophetic Imagination. Fortress Press. 2001. ISBN 978-0-8006-3287-8.
- Patrick D Miller. Fortress Press, ed. (1995). The Psalms and the Life of Faith. Fortress Press. ISBN 978-1-4514-1971-9.
- Reality, Grief, Hope: Three Urgent Prophetic Tasks. Eerdmans, 2014.
- The Renewing Word. Edited by Elmer JF Arndt. United Church Press, 1968.
- Revelation and Violence: A Study in Contextualization; 1986 Pere Marquette Theology Lecture. Marquette University Press, 1986.
- Reverberations of Faith: A Theological Handbook of Old Testament Themes. Westminster John Knox Press. 2002. ISBN 978-0-664-22231-4.
- Sabbath as Resistance. Westminster John Knox Press. January 2014. ISBN 978-0-664-23928-2.
- A Social Reading of the Old Testament: Prophetic Approaches to Israel's Communal Life. Edited by Patrick D Miller. Fortress Press, 1994. ISBN 9780800627348
- Spirituality of the Psalms. Fortress Press. ISBN 978-1-4514-1973-3.
- Testimony to Otherwise: the Witness of Elijah. Chalice Press. 2001. ISBN 978-0-8272-3670-7.
- With Charles Cousar et al., Texts for Preaching: A Lectionary Commentary Based on the NRSV-Year A. Westminster/John Knox, 1995.
- With Charles Cousar et al., Texts for Preaching: A Lectionary Commentary Based on the NRSV-Year B. Westminster/John Knox, 1993.
- Texts Under Negotiation: The Bible and Postmodern Imagination. Fortress Press. 1993. ISBN 978-0-8006-2736-2.
- The Theology of the Book of Jeremiah. Cambridge Univ. Press, 2006. ISBN.
  - The Theology of the Book of Jeremiah. Cambridge University Press. 2007. ISBN 978-0-521-60629-5.
- Theology of the Old Testament. Fortress Press, 2005. ISBN.
  - Theology of the Old Testament: Testimony, Dispute, Advocacy. Fortress Press. June 1, 2012. ISBN 978-0-8006-9931-4.
- Walter Brueggemann, Charles Campbell (1996). Charles L Campbell (ed.). Threat of Life. Fortress Press. pp. 166–. ISBN 978-1-4514-1979-5.
- To Act Justly, Love Tenderly, Walk Humbly. (With Sharon Parks and Thomas H. Groome). Paulist Press, 1986.
  - ---. WIPF & Stock, 1997. ISBN 9781579100643
- To Build, to Plant: A Commentary on Jeremiah 26–52: International Theological Commentary on the Old Testament. Continuum International Publishing Group, 1991. ISBN 9780802806000
- To Pluck Up, to Tear Down: A Commentary on the Book of Jeremiah 1–25: International Theological Commentary on the Old Testament. Eerdmans Publishing Company, 1988. ISBN 9780802803672
- Tradition for Crisis: A Study in Hosea. John Knox Press, 1968.
- Truth Speaks to Power: The Countercultural Nature of Scripture. Westminster John Knox Press. 2013. ISBN 978-0-664-23914-5.
- Using God's Resources Wisely: Isaiah and Urban Possibility. Westminster John Knox Press. 1993. ISBN 978-0-664-25460-5.
- The Vitality of Old Testament Traditions. John Knox Press, 1975.
  - Hans Walter Wolff (1982). The Vitality of Old Testament Traditions. Westminster John Knox Press. ISBN 978-0-8042-0112-4.
- What Are Christians For? An Enquiry into Obedience and Dissent. Pflaum-Standard, 1971.
