= Robert A. Kraft =

American academic (1934–2023)

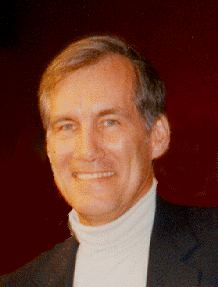
- Kraft in 1992
- Born: Robert Alan Kraft; March 18, 1934; Waterbury, Connecticut, U.S.
- Died: September 15, 2023 (aged 89); Ambler, Pennsylvania, U.S.
- Education: Doctor of Philosophy
- Alma mater: Harvard Divinity School; Wheaton College
- Occupations: Religious studies scholar, biblical scholar, university teacher
- Employer: Victoria University of Manchester
- Awards: Guggenheim Fellowship

Robert A. Kraft (March 18, 1934 – September 15, 2023) was an American religious historian who was the Berg Professor of Religious Studies Emeritus at the University of Pennsylvania. He is known for his pioneering work in the application of computing to the study of ancient literature (including the digitization and coding of ancient texts) and for his significant contributions to the study of early Judaism and early Christianity. Kraft was president of the Society of Biblical Literature in 2006.

== Life ==
Robert A. Kraft was born March 18, 1934, in Waterbury, Connecticut. He was the son of Howard Russell and Marian (Northrup) Kraft. He married Carol Wallace (an elementary school teacher) on June 11, 1955, and they had four children. Kraft died on September 15, 2023, at the age of 89.

=== Education ===
In 1955, Kraft earned a Bachelor of Arts degree (in philosophy) and in 1957 a Master of Arts degree (in New Testament), both from Wheaton College. In 1961 he completed his Ph.D. at Harvard University in the History and Philosophy of Religion (Christian Origins). His doctoral supervisor was Professor Krister Stendahl.

== Work ==
=== Teaching ===
From 1961 to 1963, Kraft was an Assistant Lecturer at the University of Manchester in England, and in 1963 he began teaching in the Department of Religious studies at the University of Pennsylvania, where he was made full professor in 1976 and Berg Chair in 1992. Kraft was also a visiting lecturer at the Lutheran Theological Seminary at Philadelphia in 1965-1966. Even in semi-retirement, Kraft continued to conduct one graduate level seminar each term.

=== Organizations ===
Kraft was a member of the Studiorum Novi Testamenti Societas (SNTS), the International Organization for Septuagint and Cognate Studies (IOSCS) and the American Society of Papyrologists. He was also a member of the Society of Biblical Literature and served as its president in 2006. Kraft was a co-founder and coordinator of the Philadelphia Seminar on Christian Origins (PSCO), which he established upon coming to Penn in 1963. He was also on the Bible Translation Commission(s) for the Revised Standard (RSV) and New Revised Standard (NRSV) Versions of the Bible.

=== Field of work ===
In his scholarship, Kraft made contributions to study of the Apostolic Fathers, particularly the Epistle of Barnabas, as well as the history and literatures of Judaism in the Greco-Roman Period, particularly the Septuagint (LXX) and Old Greek (OG) translations and their textual histories, and also Philo of Alexandria and his world. Kraft has also produced significant work in manuscript studies (including Coptic texts), on so-called "Jewish Christianity" in antiquity, on the pseudepigrapha and on the Christian transmission of ancient Jewish writings. Under Kraft's leadership and co-editorship (with G. Krodel), the Philadelphia Seminar on Christian Origins produced an English translation, with updated annotation, of Walter Bauer's classic Rechtgläubigkeit und Ketzerei im ältesten Christentum (published as Orthodoxy and Heresy in Earliest Christianity by Fortress Press, Philadelphia, 1971).

Kraft also continued to work on various scholarly projects as noted on his home page, especially the computerization of the textual variants for the ancient Jewish scriptures in Greek (as part of the CATSS project) and the digitization and description of the papyri and related documents in the Penn collections (as part of the APIS project). Also of special interest for Jewish Studies is his "New M. R. James" project, to update and expand the Lost Apocrypha of the Old Testament (published in 1920), or as Kraft preferred to say, "Parabiblical Literature and Traditions of Early Judaism" and similar materials from early Christianity.

== Awards ==
- Guggenheim Fellowship, 69-70
- American Council Learned Societies fellow, 75-76

== Select publications ==
Kraft's contribution to the study of religion in antiquity is voluminous. His publications include the following:

- The Apostolic Fathers: A New Translation and Commentary. Vol. 3, The Didache and Barnabas. New York: Thomas Nelson & Sons Ltd. 1965.
- "Some Notes on Sabbath Observance in Early Christianity". Andrews University Seminary Studies. 3: 18–33. 1965.
- Épitre de Barnabé: introduction, traduction et notes par Pierre Prigent, texte grec établi et présenté par Robert A. Kraft. Vol. 172. Paris: Sources chrétiennes. 1971.
- "In Search of 'Jewish Christianity' and its 'Theology': Problems of Definition and Methodology", Recherches de Sciences Religieuse 60 (1972) (Festschrift for Jean Daniélou on Judéo-christianisme), 81–92
- with A. E. Purintun, Paraleipomena Jeremiou (Texts and Translations 1. Pseudepigrapha Series 1; Missoula, Mont., 1972)* Testament of Job (Texts and Translations 5. Pseudepigrapha Series 3; Missoula, Mont., 1974)
- "The Development of the Concept of 'Orthodoxy' in Early Christianity", in Current Issues in Biblical and Patristic Interpretation, ed. G. F. Hawthorne (Grand Rapids, Mich., 1975), 47–59
- "The Multiform Jewish Heritage of Early Christianity", in Christianity, Judaism and Other Greco-Roman Cults: Studies for Morton Smith at Sixty (Leiden 1975), 3.174–199
- Septuagintal lexicography (Chico, Calif., 1975)
- "An Unpublished Coptic/Sahidic Psalter Codex at the University Museum in Philadelphia: A Preliminary Report", in Biblical and Armenian Studies, ed. M. E. Stone (Jerusalem 1976), 81–89
- "Christian Transmission of Greek Jewish Scriptures: A Methodological Probe", in Paganisme, Judaisme, Christianisme: Influences et affrontements dans le Monde Antique (Melanges M. Simon), ed. A. Benoit (Paris 1978), 207–226
- with Emanuel Tov, "Computer Assisted Tools for Septuagint Studies", Bulletin of the International Organization for Septuagint and Cognate Studies 14 (1981) 22–40
- with G. W. E. Nickelsburg, Early Judaism and Its Modern Interpreters (Atlanta 1986)
- "Towards Assessing the Latin Text of '5 Ezra': The Christian Connection", in Christians among Jews and Gentiles: Essays in Honor of Krister Stendahl on his Sixty-fifth Birthday (Philadelphia 1986), 158–169
- "Computer Assisted Identification and Reconstruction of Fragmentary Manuscripts (Papyri, Leather, Paper): Chester Beatty Greek Papyrus 5 (Genesis) = Rahlfs 962", in Bible et informatique: méthodes, outils, résultats. Actes du second colloque international de l'Association internationale Bible et informatique (AIBI) (Geneva 1989), 319–321
- "Philo and the Sabbath Crisis: Alexandrian Jewish Politics and the Dating of Philo's Works", in The Future of Early Christianity: Essays in Honor of Helmut Koester, ed. B. A. Pearson (Minneapolis 1991), 131–41
- "The Use of Computers in New Testament Textual Criticism," in The Text of the New Testament in Contemporary Research (compiled in honour of Bruce M. Metzger), ed. Bart D. Ehrman and Michael W. Holmes (Studies and Documents 46; Grand Rapids, Mich., 1995), 268–282
- "The Papyri Collection at the Center for Judaic Studies, University of Pennsylvania (Philadelphia): An Overview", in Atti del XXII Congresso Internazionale di Papirologia (Firenze 23-29 agosto 1998) (Florence 2000), 2.749–752
- with Benjamin G. Wright, "Coptic/Sahidic Fragments of the Biblical Psalms in the University of Pennsylvania Museum", in The Old Greek Psalter: Studies in Honour of Albert Pietersma, ed. R. J. V. Hiebert, C. E. Cox and P. J. Gentry (Journal for the Study of the Old Testament Supplement Series 332; Sheffield 2001), 163–177
- "Some Newly Identified LXX/OG Fragments among the Amherst Papyri at the Pierpont Morgan Library in New York City", in Emanuel: Studies in Hebrew Bible, Septuagint, and Dead Sea Scrolls in Honor of Emanuel Tov, edited by S. M. Paul, R. A. Kraft, L. H. Schiffman and W. W. Fields (Leiden 2003), 551–570
- "How I Met the Computer, and How It Changed My Life", SBL Forum (April 2004)
- "Daniel outside the Traditional Jewish Canon", in Studies in the Hebrew Bible, Qumran, and the Septuagint: Essays Presented to Eugene Ulrich on the Occasion of His Sixty-Fifth Birthday, ed. E. Tov, J. VanderKam and P. Flint (Supplements to Vetus Testamentum 101; Leiden 2006), 121–133
- Exploring the Scripturesque: Jewish Texts and Their Christian Contexts (Supplements to the Journal for the Study of Judaism 137; Leiden 2009)

Kraft preferred to publish his works electronically, and many of his writings may be found on his homepage.

== Commemorative publications ==
- Wright, Benjamin G., ed. (1999). A Multiform Heritage: Studies on Early Judaism and Christianity in Honor of Robert A. Kraft. Atlanta, Ga.
