= George W. Adams (academic) =

George Worthington Adams (November 22, 1905 – November 6, 1981) was the Chairman of Commission on Extension Courses and Director of the University Extension at Harvard University from 1946 to 1949. He was the third person to hold the position.

Born in Jacksonville, Illinois, he received a bachelor's degree from Illinois College and a master's degree and doctorate at Harvard, where he also served as secretary to the Graduate School of Arts and Sciences.

Adams taught at the MacMurray College for Women, and was a professor of history and dean at Colorado College. He later went on to become the chairman of the History Department at Southern Illinois University. He also taught American Studies in Salzburg, Austria.

== Published works ==
- Adams, George Worthington (1940). "Confederate Medicine". The Journal of Southern History. 6 (2): 151–166. doi:10.2307/2191203. JSTOR 2191203.
- Adams, George Worthington (1996). Doctors in blue: the medical history of the Union Army in the Civil War (Paperback reprint ed.). Baton Rouge: Louisiana State University Press. ISBN 9780807121054. OCLC 1076784011.

== Works cited ==
- Shinagel, Michael (2010). The Gates Unbarred: A History of University Extension at Harvard, 1910–2009. Harvard University Press. ISBN 978-0674051355.

Academic offices
Preceded by Arthur F. Whittem	Dean of the Harvard Extension School; 1946–1949	Succeeded by Reginald H. Phelps
