= Gale A. Yee =

American scholar of the Hebrew Bible (born 1949)

- 余蓮秀
- Born: April 9, 1949 (age 77); Cincinnati, Ohio, US

Academic background
- Education: Loyola University Chicago; St. Michael's College, Toronto
- Thesis: Composition and Tradition in the Book of Hosea (1985)
- Doctoral advisor: Anthony Ceresko

Academic work
- Discipline: Biblical studies
- Sub-discipline: Old Testament studies
- School or tradition: Christian feminism; Marxist feminism
- Institutions: University of St. Thomas; Episcopal Divinity School

Gale A. Yee (Chinese: 余蓮秀; pinyin: Yú Liánxiù; born 1949) is an American scholar of the Hebrew Bible. Her primary emphases are postcolonial criticism, ideological criticism, and cultural criticism. She applies feminist frameworks to biblical texts. An American of Chinese descent, she has written frequently on biblical interpretation from an Asian American perspective. She is the first woman of color and Asian American to be President of the Society of Biblical Literature.

== Early life and education ==
Yee was born in Cincinnati, Ohio, on April 9, 1949. She attended the Academy of Our Lady High School, graduating in 1967.

She earned a Bachelor of Arts degree in English literature in 1973 and a Master of Arts degree in the New Testament in 1975, both at Loyola University of Chicago. She completed her Doctor of Philosophy degree in 1985 in the Old Testament at the University of St. Michael's College in the Toronto School of Theology.

== Career ==
In 1987, Yee published her dissertation as Composition and Tradition in the Book of Hosea: A Redactional Critical Investigation with Scholars Press (Society of Biblical Literature Dissertation Series 102).

From 1998 until 2017, she was the Nancy W. King Professor of Biblical Studies at the Episcopal Divinity School. From 1984 to 1998, she served as Professor of Hebrew Bible and Director of Women's Studies at the University of St. Thomas (St. Paul, Minnesota). She is the former general editor of Semeia Studies. She and Athalya Brenner have worked together to edit commentaries in the Texts@Contexts series for Fortress Press.

On November 19, 2017, Yee was elected as Vice-President of the Society of Biblical Literature in 2018, leading to the position as President of the SBL in 2019. On November 24, 2019, she delivered the presidential address at the SBL Annual Meeting in 2019 in San Diego, California.

She has donated her papers (1966–2014) to the Burke Library (Columbia University Libraries) at Union Theological Seminary in New York.

== Honors ==
Yee was honored as a qianbei ("respected elder") at the 2014 International Congress of Ethnic Chinese Biblical Scholars, received the Graduate Theological Foundation's Krister Stendahl Medal in 2015, and received the Society of Biblical Literature's "Status of Women in the Profession Committee Mentor Award" in 2016. She received an honorary doctorate from Virginia Theological Seminary in 2020.

Gale A. Yee was president of the Society of Biblical Literature in 2019.

In 2021, Yee received the Outstanding Mentor Award from the Society of Biblical Literature's Committee on Underrepresented Racial and Ethnic Minorities in the Profession.

== Works ==
=== Books ===
- Yee, Gale A. (2021). Towards an Asian American Biblical Hermeneutics: An Intersectional Anthology. Eugene, Oregon: Wipf and Stock. ISBN 978-1-4514-0822-5.
- Yee, Gale A. (2003). Poor Banished Children of Eve: Woman as Evil in the Hebrew Bible. Minneapolis, Minnesota: Fortress Press. ISBN 978-1-4514-0822-5.
- Yee, Gale A. (1995). Judges and Method: New Approaches in Biblical Studies. Minneapolis, Minnesota: Fortress Press. ISBN 978-0-8006-2745-4.
- Yee, Gale A. (1987). Composition and Tradition in the Book of Hosea: A Redaction Critical Investigation. Atlanta, Georgia: Scholars Press. ISBN 978-1-55540-091-0.

=== Edited ===
- My Psalm, My Context (with Athalya Brenner) Texts@Contexts 8. London: Bloomsbury T&T Clark, 2024.
- Samuel, Kings, Chronicles, Ezra-Nehemiah (with Athalya Brenner) Texts@Contexts. London: Bloomsbury T&T Clark, 2021.
- The Hebrew Bible: Feminist and Intersectional Perspectives (with Athalya Brenner and Archie C. C. Lee), Minneapolis: Fortress Press, 2018. ISBN 978-1-5064-2549-8 OCLC 1007036296
- Honouring the Past, Looking to the Future: Essays from the 2014 International Congress of Ethnic Chinese Biblical Scholars (with Matthew Coomber and Hugh Page), Shatin: The Divinity School of Chung Chi College, The Chinese University of Hong Kong, 2016.
- The Fortress Commentary on Bible: The Old Testament and Apocrypha (with Athalya Brenner), Minneapolis: Fortress Press, 2014.
- Joshua and Judges. Texts@Contexts Series (with Athalya Brenner), Minneapolis: Fortress Press, 2013.

== See also ==
- Asian American biblical hermeneutics
- Asian feminist theology

Professional and academic associations
Preceded by Brian Blount	President of the Society of Biblical Literature; 2019	Succeeded by Adele Reinhartz
