= Paul J. Achtemeier =

American biblical scholar

- Born: 3 September 1927; Lincoln, Nebraska, US
- Died: 28 January 2013 (aged 85); Richmond, Virginia, US
- Spouse: Elizabeth Achtemeier
- Children: 2

Academic background
- Education: Elmhurst College; Union Theological Seminary (New York)

Paul John Achtemeier (3 September 1927 – 28 January 2013) was Herbert Worth and Annie H. Jackson Professor of Biblical Interpretation Emeritus at Union Theological Seminary in Virginia, now Union Presbyterian Seminary in Richmond, Virginia. He was born in Lincoln, Nebraska in 1927.

He was a widely respected authority on the New Testament, the author or co-author of 18 books and over 60 scholarly journal articles. In addition, he was editor of a number of book series, most notably as the New Testament Editor for the series Interpretation: A Bible Commentary for Teaching and Preaching and the General Editor of Harper's Bible Dictionary (1985, revised 1996), in conjunction with the Society of Biblical Literature. Achtemeier was also the former editor of the quarterly Interpretation: A Journal of Bible and Theology.

== Life ==
Achtemeier was an honors graduate of Elmhurst College (A.B.) and of Union Theological Seminary (New York) (B.D.), from where he also received his doctorate (Th.D.). He also studied at Princeton Theological Seminary, Heidelberg University (Germany), and the University of Basel (Switzerland).

Before coming to Union Theological Seminary in Virginia, Dr. Achtemeier taught at Elmhurst College and the Graduate School of Ecumenical Studies of the World Council of Churches, Château de Bossey, Switzerland. He was also visiting professor of New Testament at Pittsburgh Theological Seminary and the Lutheran Theological Seminary at Gettysburg, Pennsylvania.

He was elected to membership in several learned societies, and served as president of the Catholic Biblical Association of America, being the first non-Catholic elected to that position. He was also the president of the Society of Biblical Literature.

== Personal life ==
Achtemeier met Elizabeth Rice at seminary and they married in June 1952. They had two children and coauthored several books and articles. Their son, Mark, teaches systematic theology at Dubuque Theological Seminary. Achtemeier died after a long illness in 2013.

== Partial bibliography ==
=== Books ===
- Achtemeier, Elizabeth; Achtemeier, Paul J. (1962). The Old Testament Roots of Our Faith. Nashville: Abingdon. ISBN 9780801045417.
- Achtemeier, Paul J. (1975). Mark. Proclamation commentaries. Philadelphia, PA: Fortress Press. ISBN 9780800605810. OCLC 1649831.
- ——— (1980). The Inspiration of Scripture: Problems and Proposals.
- ——— (1985). Romans. Interpretation, a Bible Commentary for Teaching and Preaching. Atlanta, GA: John Knox Press. ISBN 9780804231374. OCLC 10878769.
- ——— (1987). Paul and the Jerusalem Church: An Elusive Unity.
- ——— (1987). Interpreting the Prophets.
- ——— (1996). 1 Peter: A Commentary on First Peter. Hermeneia Series. Augsburg Press.
- ——— (1999). Inspiration and Authority: Nature and Function of Christian Scripture.
- ———; Green, Joel B.; Thompson, Marianne M. (2001). Introducing the New Testament: Its Literature and Theology. Wm. B. Eerdmans. ISBN 9780802837172.
- ——— (2002). The Forgotten God: Perspectives in Biblical Theology.
- ——— (2002). Invitation to the Gospels.
- ——— (2008). Jesus and the Miracle Tradition.

=== Edited by ===
- ———, ed. (1985). HarperCollins Bible Dictionary. San Francisco, CA: Harper & Row. ISBN 9780060698638. OCLC 12262764.

=== Selected articles ===
- ——— (April 1983). "An Apocalyptic Shift in Early Christian Tradition: Reflections on Some Canonical Evidence". Catholic Biblical Quarterly. 45 (2): 231–248.
- ——— (Winter 1983). "It's the Little Things That Count (Mark 14:17-21, Luke 4:1-13, Matthew 18:10-14)". Biblical Archaeologist. 46 (1): 30–31. doi:10.2307/3209687. JSTOR 3209687. S2CID 187863384.
- ——— (July 1984). "'Some Things in Them Hard to Understand': Reflections on an Approach to Paul". Interpretation. 38 (3): 254–267. doi:10.1177/002096438403800304. S2CID 143148750.
- ——— (January 1986). "An Elusive Unity: Paul, Acts, and the Early Church". Catholic Biblical Quarterly. 48 (1): 1–26.
- ——— (July 1986). "Revelation 5:1-14". Interpretation. 40 (3): 283–288. doi:10.1177/002096438604000306. S2CID 171127845.
- ——— (January 1990). "Matthew 13:1-23". Interpretation. 44 (1): 61–65. doi:10.1177/002096438904400107. S2CID 170132750.
- ——— (Spring 1990). "Omne verbum sonat: The New Testament and the Oral Environment of Late Western Antiquity". Journal of Biblical Literature. 109 (1): 3–27. doi:10.2307/3267326. JSTOR 3267326.
- ——— (March 1990). "Romans 3:1-8: Structure and Argument". Anglican Theological Review, Supplement Series. 11: 77–87.
- ——— (1999). "Gods Made with Hands: The Old Testament and the Problem of Idolatry". Ex Auditu. 15: 43–61.
- ——— (July 2006). "1 Peter 1:13-21". Interpretation. 60 (3): 306–308. doi:10.1177/002096430606000306. S2CID 171210165.
- ——— (June 2009). "Jews and Gentiles in the Divine Economy". Cross Currents. 59 (2): 144–153. doi:10.1111/j.1939-3881.2009.00067.x. S2CID 170162952.
- ——— (January 2011). "1 Peter 4:1-8". Interpretation. 65 (1): 76–78. doi:10.1177/002096431106500109. S2CID 170144433.

=== Selected chapters ===
- ——— (1999). "The Christology of 1 Peter: Some Reflections". In Powell, Mark Allan; Bauer, David R. (eds.). Who Do You Say That I Am?: Essays on Christology. Louisville, KY: Westminster John Knox.
- ——— (2002). "Give us a King". In Gibson, Skye (ed.). Story Lines: Chapters on Thought, Word, and Deed: For Gabriel Fackre. Grand Rapids, MI: Eerdmans.
