= Lewis B. Paton =

American biblical scholar

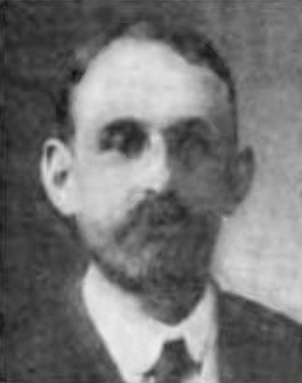
- Born: Lewis Bayles Paton; June 27, 1864; New York City, US
- Died: January 24, 1932 (aged 67); Hartford, Connecticut, US
- Education: New York University; Princeton Theological Seminary; New York University
- Occupations: Biblical scholar, academic
- Spouses: Suvia Davison (m. 1896; died 1904) Loraine Seymour Brown Calhoun (m. 1915; died 1924) Katherine Hazeltine (m. 1925)

Lewis Bayles Paton (June 27, 1864 − January 24, 1932) was an American biblical scholar, archaeologist and historian. He was a professor at the Hartford Theological Seminary for many years, and a well known authority on Old Testament exegesis.

== Biography ==
Lewis Bayles Paton was born in New York City on June 27, 1864. He was the son of Robert L. S. and Henriette Bayles Paton. Paton received his bachelor's degree in 1884 from New York University. He graduated from the Princeton Theological Seminary in 1890 and was ordained as a Presbyterian minister. He subsequently spent several years abroad to continue his studies at the University of Berlin and the University of Marburg. In 1892 he changed to the Congregational church. Paton was gained a master's degree from New York University in 1893. He later became an instructor at the Hartford Theological Seminary, where he was appointed Nettleton Professor in 1900. Between 1901 and 1904, Paton was editor-in-chief of the Journal of Biblical Literature. From 1903 to 1904, Paton was Director of the American School of Oriental Study and Research in Palestine. He received a D. D. from New York University in 1906.

At the Hartford Theological Seminary, Paton taught Old Testament exegesis and criticism. He was a well known authority on archaeology. Paton was the author of several works, including Early History of Syria and Palestine, in the Semitic Series, Jerusalem in Bible Times and Early Religion of Israel.

Paton was married three times. His first wife, Miss Suvia Davison of Hartford, died in 1904, eight years after they were married. In 1915, Paton married Mrs. Loraine Seymour Brown Calhoun of Harford. She died in 1924. In 1925 Paton married Katherine Hazeltine. He died in Hartford, Connecticut on January 24, 1932.
