= Society of Biblical Literature =

American learned society

- Abbreviation: SBL
- Formation: 1880; 146 years ago
- Headquarters: Atlanta, Georgia, US
- Members: 8,324 (2018)
- President: Tamara Cohn Eskenazi
- Executive director: Steed Davidson
- Website: sbl-site.org
- Formerly called: Society of Biblical Literature and Exegesis

The Society of Biblical Literature (SBL), founded in 1880 as the Society of Biblical Literature and Exegesis, is an American-based learned society dedicated to the academic study of the Bible and related ancient literature. Its current stated mission is to "foster biblical scholarship". Membership is open to the public and consists of over 8,300 individuals from over 100 countries. As a scholarly organization, SBL has been a constituent society of the American Council of Learned Societies since 1929.

== History ==
Calvin Stowe, husband of novelist Harriet Beecher Stowe, served as Professor of Biblical Literature at the innovative Lane Seminary—at the time one of the nation's leading seminaries—in the 1830s.

The eight founders of the Society of Biblical Literature and Exegesis first met to discuss their new society in Philip Schaff's study in New York City in January of 1880. In June of that year, the group had its first annual meeting with eighteen people in attendance. The new society drew up a constitution and by-laws and discussed several papers. Membership dues were set at three dollars. By the end of the year, membership had grown to forty-five and publication of the meeting proceedings was in the planning stages. The Journal of Biblical Literature (JBL) was launched the following year. The SBL was not the first association dedicated to biblical studies in North America, but it was the first that was interdenominational. The thirty-two founding members of SBL in 1880 even included a Unitarian, Ezra Abbott. The society's development was contemporary with increasing interest in Ancient Near East studies.

The society shortened its name to Society of Biblical Literature in 1962.

== Publications ==
The Society of Biblical Literature has published the flagship Journal of Biblical Literature since 1881. Additionally, it publishes the Review of Biblical Literature. It publishes literature under the imprint SBL Press.

The SBL Handbook of Style is a style manual specifically for the fields of ancient Near Eastern, biblical, and early Christian studies. The SBL Handbook of Style includes recommended standard formats for the abbreviation of primary sources. The Chicago Manual of Style (16th ed.) refers writers to The SBL Handbook "for authoritative guidance". The "Student Supplement" is downloadable, and also contains recommendations for transliteration standards.

In 2011, the society was awarded a $300,000 grant from the National Endowment for the Humanities to produce Bible Odyssey, "an interactive website that brings nonsectarian biblical scholarship to the general public".

In 2016, the Society of Biblical Literature published a jobs report in conjunction with the American Academy of Religion that provided employment data from the 2014–15 academic year.

== Annual meeting ==
One of the most important functions of the Society of Biblical Literature is hosting its annual meeting. The annual meeting is hosted in the United States and attended by a majority of SBL members. The meeting includes presentations of research; voting on business matters of the society; workshops and seminars; a vendor floor; and more. The meeting consists of "more than 1,200 academic sessions, and workshops, along with one of the world's largest exhibits of books and digital resources for biblical studies, the Annual Meetings is one of the largest events of the year in the fields of biblical scholarship, religious studies and theology."

=== Regional and international meetings ===
Formerly, the Society hosted multiple regional meetings per year. Regional meetings consisted of scholars in a geographic area within North America who promoted biblical scholarship on a local level. Each region was coordinated by a scholar within the region, and regions promoted "Regional Scholars" to recognize outstanding scholars in the area. Society of Biblical Literature regions included the Central States, Eastern Great Lakes, Mid-Atlantic, Midwest, New England & Eastern Canada, Pacific Coast, Pacific Northwest, Rocky Mountains & Great Plains, Southeastern, Southwestern, and Upper Midwest. The Society ended the regional meetings in 2023 and replaced them with annual Global Virtual Meetings, which began in 2023.

== Presidents ==
- 1880–1887 Daniel Raynes Goodwin
- 1887–1889 Frederic Gardiner
- 1889–1890 Francis Brown
- 1890–1891 Charles A. Briggs
- 1891–1894 Talbot W. Chambers
- 1894–1895 J. Henry Thayer
- 1895–1896 Francis Brown
- 1896–1897 Edward T. Bartlett
- 1898–1899 George F. Moore
- 1900 John P. Peters
- 1901 Edward Y. Hincks
- 1902 Benjamin W. Bacon
- 1903 Richard J. H. Gottheil
- 1904 Willis J. Beecher
- 1905 William Rainey Harper
- 1906 Paul Haupt
- 1907 James Hardy Ropes
- 1908 Frank Chamberlain Porter
- 1909 Henry Preserved Smith
- 1910 David G. Lyon
- 1911 Ernest de Witt Burton
- 1912 Lewis B. Paton
- 1913 George A. Barton
- 1914 Nathaniel Schmidt
- 1915 Charles Cutler Torrey
- 1916 Morris Jastrow Jr.
- 1917 Warren J. Moulton
- 1918 James A. Montgomery
- 1919 Edgar J. Goodspeed
- 1920 Albert T. Clay
- 1921 Kemper Fullerton
- 1922 William R. Arnold
- 1923 Max L. Margolis
- 1924 Clayton R. Bowen
- 1925 Julius A. Bewer
- 1926 Shirley Jackson Case
- 1927 Irving F. Wood
- 1928 Loring Woart Batten
- 1929 James E. Frame
- 1930 William Frederic Badè
- 1931 Burton Scott Easton
- 1932 J. M. Powis Smith
- 1933 James Moffatt
- 1934 Frederick C. Grant
- 1935 Elihu Grant
- 1936 Henry J. Cadbury
- 1937 George Dahl
- 1938 William Henry Paine Hatch
- 1939 W. F. Albright
- 1940 Chester C. McCown
- 1941 Julian Morgenstern
- 1942–1943 Kirsopp Lake
- 1944 Theophile James Meek
- 1945 Morton Scott Enslin
- 1946 Leroy Waterman
- 1947 Ernest Cadman Colwell
- 1948 John W. Flight
- 1949 Floyd V. Filson
- 1950 Robert H. Pfeiffer
- 1951 Erwin R. Goodenough
- 1952 Sheldon H. Blank
- 1953 S. Vernon McCasland
- 1954 Millar Burrows
- 1955 Amos N. Wilder
- 1956 J. Philip Hyatt
- 1957 Sherman E. Johnson
- 1958 William A. Irwin
- 1959 Robert M. Grant
- 1960 R. B. Y. Scott
- 1961 Samuel Sandmel
- 1962 Herbert G. May
- 1963 John Knox
- 1964 Fred V. Winnett
- 1965 Kenneth W. Clark
- 1966 John L. McKenzie
- 1967 Paul Schubert
- 1968 James Muilenburg
- 1969 Frank W. Beare
- 1970 Harry M. Orlinsky
- 1971 Bruce M. Metzger
- 1972 Walter J. Harrelson
- 1973 Norman Perrin
- 1974 Frank Moore Cross
- 1975 Robert W. Funk
- 1976 David Noel Freedman
- 1977 Raymond E. Brown
- 1978 James A. Sanders
- 1979 Joseph A. Fitzmyer
- 1980 Bernhard Anderson
- 1981 James M. Robinson
- 1982 Lou H. Silberman
- 1983 Krister Stendahl
- 1984 Roland E. Murphy
- 1985 Wayne A. Meeks
- 1986 James L. Mays
- 1987 Elisabeth Schüssler Fiorenza
- 1988 Philip J. King
- 1989 Paul J. Achtemeier
- 1990 Walter Brueggemann
- 1991 Helmut Koester
- 1992 Norman K. Gottwald
- 1993 Victor P. Furnish
- 1994 Phyllis Trible
- 1995 Leander E. Keck
- 1996 Gene M. Tucker
- 1997 Hans Dieter Betz
- 1998 Patrick D. Miller
- 1999 D. Moody Smith
- 2000 Adele Berlin
- 2001 Harold W. Attridge
- 2002 John J. Collins
- 2003 Eldon Jay Epp
- 2004 David L. Petersen
- 2005 Carolyn Osiek
- 2006 Robert Kraft
- 2007 Katharine Doob Sakenfeld
- 2008 Jonathan Z. Smith
- 2009 David J. A. Clines
- 2010 Vincent L. Wimbush
- 2011 Carol Newsom
- 2012 John Dominic Crossan
- 2013 Carol Meyers
- 2014 Fernando Segovia
- 2015 Athalya Brenner-Idan
- 2016 Beverly Gaventa
- 2017 Michael V. Fox
- 2018 Brian K. Blount
- 2019 Gale A. Yee
- 2020 Adele Reinhartz
- 2021 James C. VanderKam
- 2022 Adela Yarbro Collins
- 2023 Musa Dube
- 2024 Tamara Cohn Eskenazi
- 2025 Ehud Ben Zvi

== Administrative officers ==
Secretary

- 1880–1883 Frederic Gardiner
- 1883–1889 Hinckley G. Mitchell

Recording Secretary

- 1889–1890 Charles Rufus Brown
- 1890–1915 William H. Cobb
- 1916–1933 Henry J. Cadbury
- 1934–1946 John W. Flight
- 1947–1950 Kenneth W. Clark
- 1951–1952 Louise Pettibone Smith
- 1953–1961 Charles F. Kraft
- 1961 Albert C. Sundberg Jr. (pro tempore)
- 1962–1963 Kendrick Grobel

Executive Secretary

- 1964–1965 Kendrick Grobel
- 1965 Richard T. Mead (pro tempore)
- 1966 Lawrence E. Toombs
- 1967 Walter J. Harrelson
- 1968–1974 Robert W. Funk
- 1975–1976 George W. MacRae
- 1977–1980 Paul J. Achtemeier
- 1981–1987 Kent Harold Richards

Executive Director

- 1987–1995 David Lull
- 1995–2010 Kent Harold Richards
- 2010–2022 John F. Kutsko
- 2022–2023 Tat-siong Benny Liew
- 2023-Present Steed Davidson
