= Phyllis Bird =

American feminist scholar (born 1934)

The Reverend Phyllis Bird
- Born: 1934 (age 91–92); Urbana, Illinois, US
- Other name: Phyllis Ann Bird

Ecclesiastical career
- Church: United Methodist Church

Academic background
- Education: Union Theological Seminary; Harvard University
- Thesis: YRŠ and the Deuteronomic Theology of the Conquest (c. 1972)

Academic work
- Discipline: Biblical studies
- Sub-discipline: Old Testament studies
- School or tradition: Christian feminism
- Institutions: Southern Methodist University; Garrett–Evangelical Theological Seminary

Phyllis Ann Bird (born 1934) is an American feminist scholar in biblical hermeneutics. She is professor emerita of Old Testament Interpretation at Garrett–Evangelical Theological Seminary and McCarthy Professor of Biblical Studies at the Pontifical Biblical Institute. Bird is an ordained elder in the United Methodist Church, and was one of the translators of the New Revised Standard Version.

== Books ==
- Missing Persons and Mistaken Identities: Women and Gender in Ancient Israel ISBN 9780800631284 OCLC 37310780
- The Bible as the Church's Book ISBN 9780664244279 OCLC 8430410

== See also ==
- Historical criticism
