= Elihu Grant =

American minister and scholar (1873–1942)

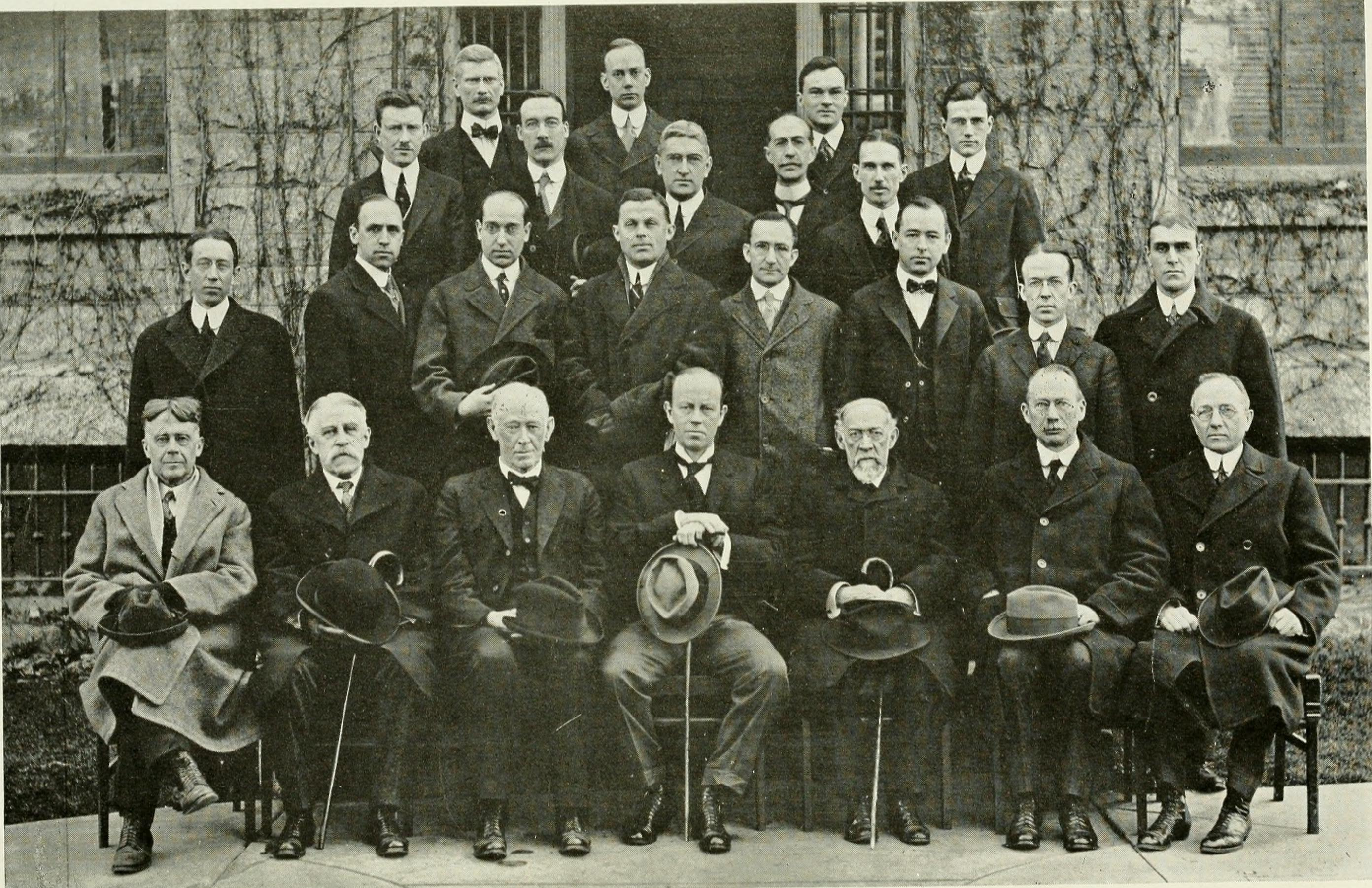
Grant, at Haverford College, 1918

Elihu Grant (1873 – November 2, 1942) was an American Methodist pastor, scholar and writer on Palestine.

Grant was ordained Methodist minister in 1900, and between 1901 and 1904 he was superintendent of the American Friends Schools in Ramallah and al-Bireh near Jerusalem. Returning to the US he was a professor of biblical literature at Smith College from 1907 to 1917, and thereafter at Haverford College until his retirement in 1938.

Between 1928 and 1933 he directed four campaigns of excavations at Ain Shems (Beth Shemesh), and Time magazine reported that he found jugs and vases which represented a Bronze Age culture.

One of his lifelong interest was the life of the Palestinian fellahin, an interest which started when he first worked for the American Friends School, and which resulted in three books, published in 1907, 1920 and 1921. The 1907 book The Peasantry of Palestine: The Life, Manners, and Customs of the Village is described as "a vividly accurate portrait of rural life in Palestine".

== Books (partial list) ==
- Grant, Elihu (1907). The Peasantry of Palestine. Boston, New York [etc.]: The Pilgrim Press.
- Irving Francis Wood, Elihu Grant (1916): The Bible as Literature : An Introduction, New York, NY, on archive.net, also: ISBN 1-4286-2556-9 Kessinger Publishing, 2006 reprint.
- Elihu Grant (1918): Cuneiform Documents in the Smith College Library, Haverford, Pennsylvania
- ——— (1920): The Orient in Bible Times, J. B. Lippincott Company,
- ——— (1921): The People of Palestine archive.org
- ——— (1922): A New Era In Palestine Exploration, GPO, Washington, pp. 541–547, with 7 plates, offprint, the Annual Report of the Board of Regents of the Smithsonian Institution for the Year Ending June 30,
- ——— (1929): Beth Shemesh (Palestine) : Progress of the Haverford Archaeological expedition,
- ——— (1931): Ain Shems Excavations (Palestine) 1928-1931. Part 1. (With an Historical Chapter by Irving F. Wood), Haverford
- ——— (1932): Ain Shems Excavations (Palestine) 1928-31. Part 2. Haverford
- ——— (1934): Rumeileh: Being Ain Shems Excavations (Palestine), Part III (Biblical and Kindred Studies), Haverford College.
- ——— (1938): Ain Shems Excavations (Palestine). Part 4: Pottery, Haverford
- ——— (1938): Palestine Today, Baltimore, Maryland: J. H. Furst Company
- ——— (1939): Ain Shems Excavations (Palestine), Part V (Text), Haverford College,
- ——— (1940): Palestine, Our Holy Land, Baltimore, Maryland: J. H. Furst Company
- ——— (2005): People of Palestine: An Enlarged Edition of the Peasantry of Palestine, Life, Manners and Customs of the Village, Wipf & Stock, Reprint ISBN 978-1-59752-272-4
