= Mary F. Foskett =

Chinese-American New Testament scholar

Mary F. Foskett (born 1961) is a Chinese-American New Testament scholar.

== Biography ==
An ethnic Chinese born in Japan, Foskett was adopted into a white American family. Foskett received her BA from New York University, M.Div. from Union Theological Seminary, New York, and Ph.D. in New Testament and Christian Origins from Emory University. She is presently the Wake Forest Kahle Professor of Religious Studies and Albritton Fellow at Wake Forest University, and has written primarily in contemporary New Testament studies, with a focus on gender and Asian American culture.

== Works ==
- Foskett, Mary F. (2002). A Virgin Conceived: Mary and Classical Representations of Virginity. Indiana University Press. ISBN 978-0-253-10896-8.
- Foskett, Mary F. (2004). Moral Teachings of Jesus. Abingdon Press. ISBN 978-0-687-03865-7.
- Foskett, Mary F. (2009). Interpreting the Bible: Approaching the Text in Preparation for Preaching. Fortress Press. ISBN 978-0-8006-6354-4.
- Kuan, Jeffrey Kah-Jin; Foskett, Mary F., eds. (2006). Ways of Being, Ways of Reading: Asian American Biblical Interpretation. Chalice Press. ISBN 978-0-8272-4254-8.
- Wan, Sze-kar; Foskett, Mary F., eds. (2014). Diverse strands of a common thread : An introduction to ethnic Chinese Biblical interpretation. Hong Kong: Chinese University of Hong Kong.
