= New Interpreter's Study Bible =

The New Interpreter's Study Bible is a study Bible first published by Abingdon Press/Cokesbury in 2003 which uses the complete New Revised Standard Version (NRSV) text with Apocrypha. The NISB is the expanded edition of the NRSV text that includes 3 and 4 Maccabees, and Psalm 151, which are considered as authoritative in Eastern Orthodox churches.
