= Elizabeth Achtemeier =

American ordained Presbyterian minister, Bible professor and author

- Born: 11 June 1926; Bartlesville, Oklahoma, U.S.
- Died: 25 October 2002 (aged 76); Richmond, Virginia, U.S.
- Spouse: Paul J. Achtemeier
- Children: 2

Academic background
- Education: Stanford University; Union Presbyterian Seminary; Columbia University (Ph.D.)

Elizabeth Rice Achtemeier (June 11, 1926 – October 25, 2002) was an American ordained Presbyterian minister, Bible professor, and author.

== Early life and education ==
Born Elizabeth Rice on June 11, 1926, in Bartlesville, Oklahoma, Achtemeier was raised in the Presbyterian Church (USA), in which her grandfather had been a minister. She had three older brothers. She completed undergraduate studies at Stanford University and studied at Union Theological Seminary in New York from 1948 until 1951. In the summer of 1950, she was an associate pastor and preacher for a Congregational Church in rural New Hampshire. She did postgraduate work at Heidelberg University in Germany and Basel University in Switzerland and completed her PhD at Columbia University under James Muilenburg in 1959.

== Career ==
Achtemeier began teaching the Old Testament at Lancaster Theological Seminary while completing her PhD, teaching there until 1973. In 1973, her husband joined the all-male faculty of Union Theological Seminary as Professor of New Testament, and Achtemeier was offered an appointment as visiting, later adjunct, professor of Old Testament and visiting professor of homiletics, which she held until 1996. She was also a visiting professor at Gettysburg Lutheran Seminary, Pittsburgh Theological Seminary and Duke Divinity School.

Achtemeier was an ordained Presbyterian minister and a "nationally known preacher." She served on the denomination's Theological Task Force on Peace, Unity and Purity. Often the first or lone female in various roles she took on, she identified as an evangelical and spoke against what she called "radical feminism." She spoke and wrote against the ordination of homosexual ministers and against the church adopting female language for God.

Achtemeier wrote more than twenty books, as well as numerous articles, the majority focusing on the Old Testament and its use in Christian preaching. Her first book, co-authored with her husband, The Old Testament Roots of Our Faith was published in 1962. Her most well known book, The Old Testament and the Proclamation of the Gospel was published in 1973. She also wrote on marriage, family, sexuality, abortion and environmental issues. She preached and taught at numerous churches and university chapels across the United States and Canada. In 1999, she published an autobiography, Not Til I Have Done.

== Personal life ==
Achtemeier met Paul J. Achtemeier at seminary and they married in June 1952. They had two children and coauthored several books and articles. Their son, Mark, teaches systematic theology at Dubuque Theological Seminary. Achtemeier died on October 25, 2002, after a long illness.

== Publications ==
=== Books ===
- Achtemeier, Elizabeth; Achtemeier, Paul J. (1962). The Old Testament Roots of Our Faith. Nashville: Abingdon. ISBN 9780801045417.
- Achtemeier, Elizabeth (1973). The Old Testament and the Proclamation of the Gospel. Philadelphia: Westminster.
- Achtemeier, Elizabeth (1976). The Committed Marriage. Philadelphia: Westminster.
- Achtemeier, Elizabeth (1980). Creative Preaching. Nashville: Abingdon.
- Achtemeier, Elizabeth (1987). Preaching About Family Relationships. Philadelphia: Westminster.
- Achtemeier, Elizabeth (1989). Preaching from the Old Testament. Louisville: Westminster John Knox. ISBN 9780664250423.
- Achtemeier, Elizabeth (1991). So You're Looking for a New Preacher: A Guide for Pulpit Nominating Committees. Eerdmans.
- Achtemeier, Elizabeth (1992). Nature, God, and Pulpit. Grand Rapids: Eerdmans.
- Schlossberg, Terry; Achtemeier, Elizabeth Rice (1995). Not My Own: Abortion and the Marks of the Church. Eerdmans.
- Achtemeier, Elizabeth (1996). Minor Prophets I. New International Biblical Commentary. Hendrickson. ISBN 9780943575056.
- Achtemeier, Elizabeth Rice (1998). Preaching Hard Texts of the Old Testament. Hendrickson.
- Achtemeier, Elizabeth Rice (1998). Preaching from the Minor Prophets: Texts and Sermon Suggestions. Eerdmans. ISBN 9780802843708.
- Achtemeier, Elizabeth (1999). Not Til I Have Done: A Personal Testimony. Louisville: Westminster John Knox.
- Achtemeier, Elizabeth (2011). Nahum-Malachi. Interpretation: A Bible Commentary for Teaching and Preaching. Louisville: Westminster John Knox. ISBN 9781611644760.

=== Articles ===
- Achtemeier, Elizabeth (1984). "Covenanting: New Directions for Ecumenism". Christian Century: 1014.
- Achtemeier, Elizabeth (1986). "Female Language for God: Should the Church Adopt it?". In Miller, Donald G. (ed.). The Hermeneutical Quest: Essays in Honor of James Luther Mays on His Sixty-fifth Birthday. Wipf and Stock. pp. 97–114. ISBN 9780802806123.
- Achtemeier, Elizabeth (January 1988). "The Impossible Possibility: Evaluating the Feminist Approach to Bible and Theology". Interpretation. 42: 45–57. doi:10.1177/002096438804200105. S2CID 169513311.
- Achtemeier, Elizabeth (1992). "Exchanging God for "No Gods": A Discussion of Female Language for God". In Kimel, Alvin F. (ed.). Speaking the Christian God:The Holy Trinity and the Challenge of Feminism. Eerdmans. pp. 1–16. ISBN 9780802806123.
- Achtemeier, Elizabeth (1999). "Debating Evolution: The God Who Would Intervene". Christian Century.
- Achtemeier, Elizabeth (2000). "The Scriptural Basis for Women in Ministry". ReNew. 11 (3).
