= SBL Greek New Testament =

The Greek New Testament: SBL Edition, also known as the SBL Greek New Testament (SBLGNT), is a critically edited edition of the Greek New Testament published by Logos Bible Software and the Society of Biblical Literature in October 2010. It was edited by Michael W. Holmes. It is also published in paperback form.

The SBLGNT features an apparatus that records differences not among manuscripts, but rather from other published editions of the Greek New Testament. According to the editors this is a function of a "reading edition" that calls attention to text critical issues. The text was created by starting with the Westcott and Hort text and then comparing it to Tregelles, Robinson-Pierpont, and the text underlying the NIV.

The text is available under the Creative Commons Attribution 4.0 International license, a permissive license that allows royalty-free commercial and non-commercial use. The open licensing of the SBLGNT was a design goal of the text and has been heralded as an important resource for academic publishing.
