= Irving Francis Wood =

American biblical scholar

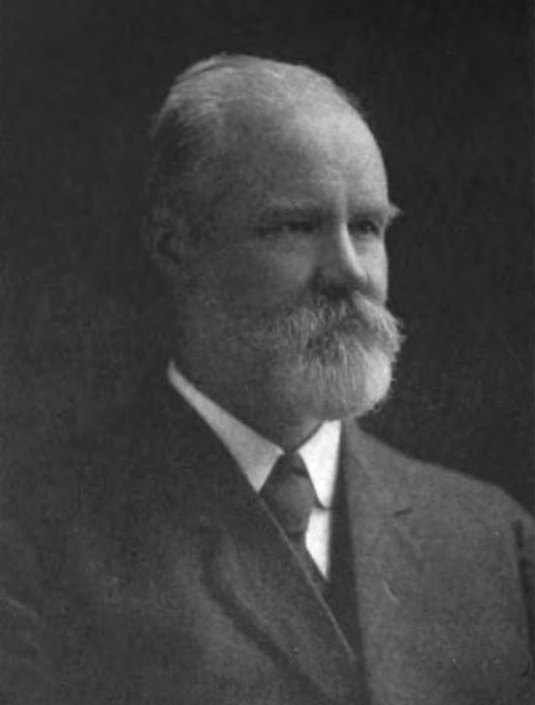
- Wood c. 1914
- Born: May 27, 1861; Walton, New York, US
- Died: August 29, 1934 (aged 73); Washington, D.C., US
- Education: Hamilton College; Yale University; University of Chicago
- Occupation: Biblical scholar
- Spouse: Katherine Hastings (m. 1892)
- Children: 2

Irving Francis Wood (1861–1934) was an American biblical scholar.

== Biography ==
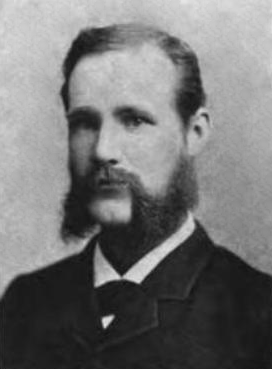
Wood as an undergraduate at Hamilton College

Professor Wood was born at Walton, New York on May 27, 1861. He graduated from Hamilton College in 1885 with a Bachelor of Arts degree, and taught at Jaffna College, Ceylon, until 1889. Wood then studied for his Bachelor of Divinity degree at Yale and completed it in 1892, the same year he met and married his wife, Katherine Hastings. Katherine bore him two children, Constance and Edna, who both went to get collegiate degrees.

He taught for a short time at the University of Chicago before taking a job as a professor of Biblical literature and comparative religion at Smith College in 1893. He went continuously studied and received a Ph. D. from the University of Chicago in 1903 and a D.D. from Hamilton College in 1915. He requisitioned a leave of absence from Smith College for year's time (1934-25) to serve as a visiting professor in Ginling College, Nanjing, China. Wood had served on Ginling's Board of Founders for an extensive period of time. During this period he also taught at Doshisa University in Japan. He retired from Smith College in 1930 and took trips back to China to guest lecture at Ginling and visit his daughter, who was a missionary.

He died at his home in Washington, D.C. on August 29, 1934.

== Works ==
- Adult Bible Classes (1906), with Newton M. Hall
- The Bible Story (five volumes, 1906), with Newton M. Hall
- The Early Days Of Israel (three parts, 1906), with Newton M. Hall
- The Days of the Kings of Israel (1908), with Newton M. Hall
- The Spirit of God in Biblical Literature-A Study in the History of Religion (1904)
- Adult Class Study (1911)
- The Bible as Literature (1914), with Elihu Grant
- The Heroes of Early Israel (1920)
