= Exodus narrative in Antebellum America =

The Exodus Narrative in Antebellum America was repeatedly used in early American history. Both slaves and slaveowners used the traditional biblical story of the Exodus to not only form their respective identities but also to define their purpose in America.

The motif of the Exodus was first used in American history in 1630 by John Winthrop, aboard the Arabella in his famous sermon "A Modell for Christian Charity". In this sermon Winthrop introduced the idea that the Puritans, had inherited the divine covenant first given to the Hebrews, making them New Israel. In this conception, the crossing of the Atlantic was equated to the Exodus. From this moment on, early Americans would adopt this narrative as their founding myth.

During the 19th century, slaveowners also used this narrative to explain their situation and give them a purpose. The slaveowners set themselves up as New Israel, the "Redeemer Nation". In this understanding, slaveowners were "to reach the pinnacle of perfection and to carry liberty and the gospel around the globe."

As with slaveowners, slaves also used the Exodus narrative to frame their situation. Although in their version however, slaveowners were cast in the role of Pharaoh, instead of New Israel, and the slaves corresponded to the Israelites. The Exodus narrative not only became an instrument of hope for the enslaved, but also allowed them to make sense of their situation and provided a blueprint for their deliverance. This can be most best seen in their spirituals, such as "Go Down Moses" and "Deep River". By appropriating the narrative of Exodus the slaves did more than simply try to understand their situation and their past; they created for themselves a national identity and, equally importantly, a mythic past.
