= Journal of Biblical Literature =

- Discipline: Old Testament, New Testament
- Language: English
- Edited by: Susan E. Hylen

Publication details
- History: 1881–present
- Publisher: Society of Biblical Literature (U.S.)
- Frequency: Quarterly

Standard abbreviations
- ISO 4: J. Biblic. Lit.

Indexing
- ISSN: 0021-9231
- JSTOR: 00219231

Links
- Journal homepage

The Journal of Biblical Literature (JBL) is one of three academic journals published by the Society of Biblical Literature (SBL). First published in 1881, JBL is the flagship journal of the field. JBL is published quarterly and includes scholarly articles, critical notes, and book reviews by members of the Society. JBL is available on line as well as in print.

JBL has a moving window of Open Access. Aside from the current issue, the past three years of JBL are freely available to the public in PDF form after registering on the SBL website. Previous issues, back to 1881, are available in the JSTOR Arts and Sciences III collection."

== History ==
The journal was originally published under the title Journal of the Society of Biblical Literature and Exegesis. The current name was adopted with volume 9 (1890).

At the fourth meeting, on 29 December 1881, the SBL council voted to print 500 copies of a journal, including the full text of papers read at the society's annual June meetings.

JBL was, at first, an annual serial, from 1882 to 1905 (though two serials appeared in each of 1886 and 1887). JBL became semiannual from 1906 to 1911, and has been quarterly since 1912 (with a hiatus in 1915 and exceptional years with only two serials).

In 1916, the SBL secretary passed on to the members a communication, from the Third Assistant Postmaster General of the United States, refusing to give the JBL the second-class rate discount for scholarly journals, "on the ground that it was not scientific."

"The Journal of the Society for Biblical Literature in the United States was published in Leipzig through World War I down to the Nazi period—yet for the most part this feature showed up only when it became a problem for delivery after Germany began to be devastated after 1916."

Samuel Sharpe, an English ordained minister and egyptologist was editor of a journal also called Journal of Biblical Literature, published from London prior to the establishment of SBL and its journal.

== Editors ==
JBL editors:

1880–1883	Frederic Gardiner
1883–1889	Hinckley Gilbert Thomas Mitchell
1889–1894	George Foot Moore
1894–1900	David Gordon Lyon
1901–1904	Lewis B. Paton
1905–1906	James Hardy Ropes
1907	Benjamin Wisner Bacon
1908–1909	Julius A. Bewer
1910–1913	James Alan Montgomery
1914–1921	Max Leopold Margolis
1922–1929	George Dahl
1930–1933	Carl Hermann Kraeling
1934	George Dahl
1935–1942	Erwin Ramsdell Goodenough
1943–1947	Robert H. Pfeiffer
1948–1950	J. Philip Hyatt
1951–1954	Robert C. Dentan
1955–1959	David Noel Freedman
1960–1969	Morton S. Enslin
1970	John HP Reumann
1971–1976	Joseph Augustine Fitzmyer
1977–1982	John Haralson Hayes
1983–1988	Victor Paul Furnish
1989–1994	John J. Collins
1995–1999	Jouette M. Bassler
2000–2006	Gail R. O'Day
2006–2011	James C. Vanderkam
2012–2018	Adele Reinhartz
2019–2021	Mark G. Brett
2022–present	Susan E. Hylen

- Note: the title editor was introduced in 1938, the SBL secretary fulfilling the role in prior years.

== See also ==
- Review of Biblical Literature
- SBL Forum
