= James Hardy Ropes =

American theologian

James Hardy Ropes (September 3, 1866 – January 7, 1933) was an American theologian. He graduated from Harvard College in 1889 and was an instructor there from 1895 to 1898 and an assistant professor until 1903. Ropes was then appointed the Bussey Professor of New Testament criticism. He occupied the Hollis Chair at Harvard Divinity School starting in 1910. He was also the Chairman of Commission on Extension Courses and Dean of the University Extension.

He led the funeral of Henry Bradford Endicott, for whom Ropes' boss, Harvard President A. Lawrence Lowell, served as a pall bearer with Governors Calvin Coolidge and Samuel W. McCall.

== Works ==
Volume three of The Beginnings of Christianity was a presentation of Ropes' textual evidence for Acts.

== Works cited ==
- Shinagel, Michael (2010). The Gates Unbarred: A History of University Extension at Harvard, 1910 - 2009. Harvard University Press. ISBN 978-0674051355.

Academic offices
Preceded by N/A New position	Dean of the Harvard Extension School; 1910 - 1922	Succeeded by Arthur F. Whittem
