= Dubuque Theological Seminary =

Coordinates: 42.4973°N 90.6926°W

University of Dubuque Theological Seminary
- Former names: Van Vliet Seminary (1852-1864) German Theological School of the Northwest (1864-1920)
- Type: Seminary
- Established: 1852
- Religious affiliation: Presbyterian Church (USA)
- Location: Dubuque, Iowa, United States
- Campus: Urban
- Website: udts.dbq.edu

The University of Dubuque Theological Seminary is one of the ten official seminaries of the Presbyterian Church (USA). It is located in Dubuque, Iowa. Originally classes were taught in German to serve the immigrant population, but today the school is well known for its emphasis on Native American and rural ministry and online education. It is a seminary within the larger University of Dubuque.

In 1976, Dubuque Theological Seminary joined with the University of Iowa, the Aquinas Institute of Theology, and the Wartburg Theological Seminary to establish the ecumenical Association of Theological Schools of Iowa.
