= Patrick D. Miller =

American biblical scholar (1935–2020)

Patrick D. Miller, Jr.
- Born: 24 October 1935
- Died: 1 May 2020 (aged 84)
- Title: Charles T. Haley Professor of Old Testament Theology at Princeton Theological Seminary

Academic work
- Institutions: Union Presbyterian Seminary; Princeton Theological Seminary
- Notable works: Deuteronomy (1990)

Patrick D. Miller, Jr. (24 October 1935 – 1 May 2020) was an American Old Testament scholar who served as Charles T. Haley Professor of Old Testament Theology at Princeton Theological Seminary from 1984 to 2005. He was an ordained minister in the Presbyterian Church (U.S.A.).

Miller studied at Davidson College, Union Theological Seminary in Virginia, and Harvard University. He taught at Union from 1966 to 1984, and at Princeton from 1984 to 2005.

Miller served as editor of Theology Today, and, in 1998, as president of the Society of Biblical Literature.

In 2003, a Festschrift was published in his honor. A God So Near: Essays on Old Testament Theology in Honor of Patrick D. Miller (ISBN 1575060671) included contributions from Walter Brueggemann, Frank Moore Cross, and Hugh G. M. Williamson.

Miller died on 1 May 2020 after a long illness.

== Works ==
=== Books ===
- Miller, Patrick D. (1973). The Divine Warrior in Early Israel. Harvard Semitic Monographs. Vol. 5. Cambridge, MA: Harvard University Press. ISBN 978-0-6742-1296-1. OCLC 800764.
- ——— (1986). Interpreting the Psalms. Philadelphia, PA: Fortress Press. ISBN 978-0-800-61896-4. OCLC 12419909.
- ——— (1990). Deuteronomy. Interpretation, a Bible commentary for teaching and preaching. Louisville, KY: Westminster, John Knox Press. ISBN 978-0-804-23105-3. OCLC 21195417.
- ——— (1994). They Cried to the Lord: the form and theology of Biblical prayer. Minneapolis, MS: Fortress Press. ISBN 978-0-800-62762-1. OCLC 30073416.
- ——— (2000). The Religion of Ancient Israel. Library of Ancient Israel. London; Louisville, KY: SPCK; Westminster, John Knox Press. ISBN 978-0-6642-2145-4. OCLC 44174114.
- ——— (2009). The Ten Commandments. Interpretation, Resources for the Use of Scripture in the Church. Louisville, KY: Westminster, John Knox Press. ISBN 978-0-6642-6475-8.
- ——— (2013). The Lord of the Psalms. Westminster John Knox Press. ISBN 978-1-6116-4355-8.

=== As editor ===
- ———; Cross, Frank Moore; Lemke, Werner E., eds. (1976). Magnalia Dei, the Mighty Acts of God: essays on the Bible and archaeology in memory of G. Ernest Wright. Garden City, NY: Doubleday. ISBN 978-0-3850-5257-3. OCLC 1975958.
- Brueggemann, Walter (1992). Miller, Patrick D. (ed.). Old Testament Theology: essays on structure, theme, and text. Minneapolis, MS: Fortress Press. ISBN 978-0-800-62537-5. OCLC 24546907.
- Brueggemann, Walter (1994). Miller, Patrick D. (ed.). A Social Reading of the Old Testament: prophetic approaches to Israel's communal life. Minneapolis, MS: Fortress Press. ISBN 978-0-800-62734-8. OCLC 28799432.
- Brueggemann, Walter (1995). Miller, Patrick D. (ed.). The Psalms and the Life of Faith. Minneapolis, MS: Fortress Press. ISBN 978-0-800-62733-1. OCLC 32779000.
