= Frank Moore Cross =

American scholar & academic (1921–2012)

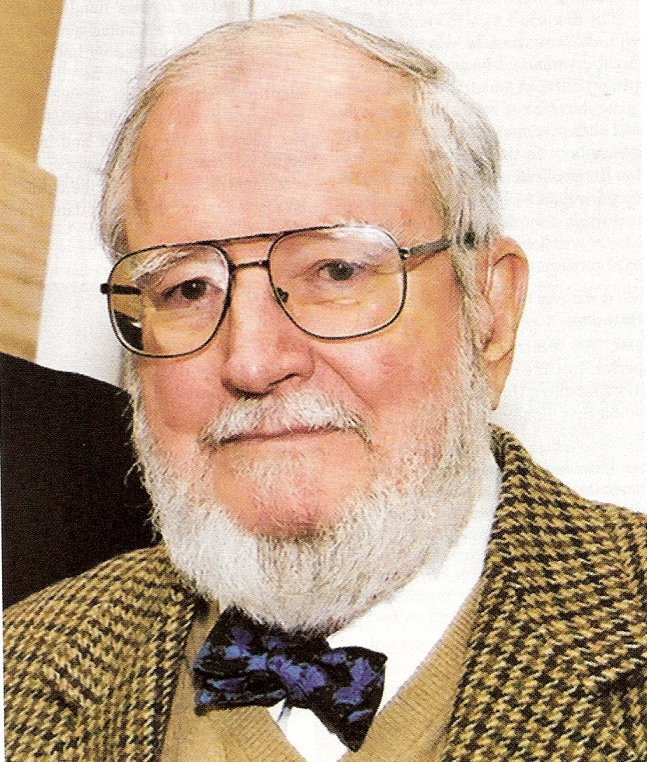
- Born: Frank Moore Cross Jr. July 13, 1921; Ross, California, US
- Died: October 2012 (aged 91); Rochester, New York, US
- Spouse: Betty (m. 1947; died 2009)

Academic background
- Education: Maryville College (BA); McCormick Theological Seminary (BDiv); Johns Hopkins University (PhD)
- Doctoral advisor: William F. Albright

Academic work
- Institutions: Harvard University
- Doctoral students: James R. Davila; Sidnie White Crawford; Richard Elliott Friedman; Choon-Leong Seow; Lawrence Stager; Michael E. Stone
- Notable students: Burgess Carr
- Main interests: Hebrew Bible; Northwest Semitic epigraphy; Dead Sea Scrolls
- Notable works: The Ancient Library of Qumran and Modern Biblical Studies (1958); Canaanite Myth and Hebrew Epic (1973)

Frank Moore Cross Jr. (July 13, 1921 – October 16, 2012) was the Hancock Professor of Hebrew and Other Oriental Languages at Harvard University, notable for his work in the interpretation of the Dead Sea Scrolls, his 1973 magnum opus Canaanite Myth and Hebrew Epic, and his work in Northwest Semitic epigraphy. Many of his essays on the latter topic have since been collected in Leaves from an Epigrapher's Notebook.

== Early life and education ==
Cross was born on July 13, 1921, in Ross, California. He was the son of Frank Moore Cross, a long-time pastor of Ensley Highland Presbyterian Church in Birmingham, Alabama. One of his uncles, Laurance L. Cross, was mayor of Berkeley, California, from 1947 to 1955.

Cross graduated from Ensley High School in 1938. He received a BA from Maryville College in 1942 and a BD from McCormick Theological Seminary, where he was awarded the Nettie F. McCormick Fellowship in Old Testament Studies, in 1946. Cross went on to study under William F. Albright, the founding father of biblical archaeology, at Johns Hopkins University, where he received a PhD in 1950. He also received an MA at Harvard in 1958. Cross was awarded a DPhil from the Hebrew University in Jerusalem in 1984 and a DSc from the University of Lethbridge in 1990.

== Career ==
From 1949 to 1950 Cross was a junior instructor in Semitic languages at Johns Hopkins University. He was subsequently an instructor in biblical history at Wellesley College from 1950 to 1951, an instructor in Old Testament at McCormick Theological Seminary 1951 to 1953, and an associate professor at the same institution from 1954 to 1957.

Cross was appointed associate professor in Old Testament at Harvard Divinity School in 1957. One year later, he was appointed Harvard University's Hancock Professor of Hebrew and Other Oriental Languages, the third oldest university chair in the United States. He would hold this position from 1958 to 1992, then becoming Hancock Professor Emeritus. Cross was curator of the Harvard Semitic Museum from 1958 to 1961 and director of the museum from 1974 to 1987.

Cross was a fellow of the American Council of Learned Societies (1971–1972) and a fellow of the Institute for Advanced Studies at the Hebrew University of Jerusalem (1978–1979). He was elected a fellow of the American Academy of Arts and Sciences (1961), a member of the Catholic Biblical Association (1968), and a member of the American Philosophical Society (1971).

During his tenure at Harvard, Cross supervised more than a hundred dissertations, with the result that many of today's senior scholars in Hebrew Bible and ancient Near Eastern studies are his former students. Among the most prominent of these are Emanuel Tov, John J. Collins, Jo Ann Hackett, John Huehnergard, William G. Dever, P. Kyle McCarter Jr., Peter Machinist, Lawrence Stager, Bruce Waltke, Richard Elliott Friedman, Hector Avalos, and Mark S. Smith.

== Dead Sea Scrolls ==
Beginning June 1953, Cross was a member of the international committee responsible for editing the Dead Sea Scrolls, which had been discovered at Qumran. Cross first heard of the scrolls in late 1948 while a student at Johns Hopkins University, when he was shown pictures of the Isaiah Scroll by Albright, who would later nominate Cross to the Scrolls' editorial team. On joining the team he was immediately allocated 61 biblical manuscripts from Cave 4 at Qumran to prepare for publication. Initially, this involved cleaning the manuscripts in the Palestine Archaeological Museum where they were being worked on in the "Scrollery". As with several others on the team, Cross was financially supported between 1954 and 1960 by a John D Rockefeller subsidy. Cross was one of only two American scholars on the scroll-publication team, and he has since been recognized as a founder of Qumran studies. His general introduction to the topic is The Ancient Library of Qumran, the third edition of which was published in 1995.

== Death ==
Cross died in Rochester, New York, in October 2012 after a long illness. He was 91.

== Honors and awards ==
In 1980, Cross received the Percia Schimmel Prize in Archaeology from the Israel Museum and the William Foxwell Albright Award in Biblical Scholarship. In 1991 he was awarded the Medalla de Honor de la Universidad Complutense (University of Madrid), the Gratz College Centennial Award in 1998 and a Lifetime Award in Textual Studies from the National Foundation for Jewish Culture in 2004.

Cross was an honorary member of the Israel Exploration Society and the British Society for Old Testament Study. He was a trustee of the American Schools of Oriental Research (1973–1991), and an honorary trustee from 1991; a trustee of the Ancient Biblical Manuscript Center (1979–1996) and a lifetime honorary trustee from 1997; and a trustee of the Dead Sea Scrolls Foundation since 1992.

== Selected works ==
=== Thesis ===
- Cross, Frank Moore; Freedman, David Noel (1952). Early Hebrew Orthograph: A Study of the Epigraphic Evidence (Joint PhD.). American Oriental Series. Vol. 36. New Haven, CT: American Oriental Society / Johns Hopkins University. OCLC 1179572.

=== Books ===
- Cross, Frank Moore (1973). Canaanite Myth and Hebrew Epic: Essays in the History of the Religion of Israel. Cambridge, MA: Harvard University Press. ISBN 978-0-674-09175-7. OCLC 671934.
- ———; Freedman, David Noel (1975). Studies in Ancient Yahwistic Poetry. Dissertation series (Society of Biblical Literature). Vol. 21. Missoula, MT: Scholars Press for the Society of Biblical Literature. ISBN 978-0-891-30014-4. OCLC 1622259.
- ———; Talmon, Shemaryahu (1975). Qumran and the History of the Biblical Text. Cambridge, MA: Harvard University Press. ISBN 978-0-674-74360-1. OCLC 1339664.
- ———; Lemke, Werner E.; Miller, Patrick D., eds. (1976). Magnalia Dei, the Mighty Acts of God: Essays On the Bible and Archaeology in Memory of G. Ernest Wright. Garden City, NY: Doubleday. ISBN 978-0-385-05257-3. OCLC 1975958.
- ———, ed. (1979). Symposia Celebrating the Seventy-Fifth Anniversary of the Founding of the American Schools of Oriental Research (1900-1975). Occasional publications – Zion Research Foundation. Cambridge, MA: American Schools of Oriental Research. ISBN 978-0-897-57503-4. OCLC 4775395.
- ——— (1995). The Ancient Library of Qumran. Haskell lectures, Oberlin College, 1956-1957 (3rd ed.). Minneapolis, MN: Fortress Press. ISBN 978-0-800-62807-9. OCLC 32719999.
- ——— (1998). From Epic to Canon: History and Literature in Ancient Israel. Baltimore: Johns Hopkins University Press. ISBN 978-0-801-85982-3. OCLC 38966035.
- ——— (2003). Leaves from an Epigrapher's Notebook: Collected Papers in Hebrew and West Semitic Palaeography and Epigraphy. Harvard Semitic Studies. Vol. 51. Winona Lake, IN: Eisenbrauns. ISBN 978-1-575-06911-1. OCLC 50476904.
- ———; et al., eds. (2005). Qumran cave 4. XII, 1–2 Samuel. Discoveries in the Judaean Desert. Vol. 17. Oxford; New York: Clarendon Press. ISBN 978-0-199-24923-7. OCLC 48754179.

=== Chapters ===
- ——— (1976). "Exile and Restoration: The 'Olden gods' in ancient near eastern creation myths". In ———; Lemke, Werner E.; Miller, Patrick D. (eds.). Magnalia Dei, the Mighty Acts of God: Essays On the Bible and Archaeology in Memory of G. Ernest Wright. Garden City, NY: Doubleday. ISBN 978-0-385-05257-3. OCLC 1975958.
- ——— (1979). "The Development of the Jewish scripts". In Wright, G. Ernest (ed.). The Bible and the Ancient Near East: Essays in Honor of William Foxwell Albright. Winona Lake, IN: Eisenbrauns. ISBN 978-0-931-46403-4. OCLC 4964210.
- ——— (1979). "Early Alphabetic Scripts". In ——— (ed.). Symposia Celebrating the Seventy-Fifth Anniversary of the Founding of the American Schools of Oriental Research (1900-1975). Occasional publications – Zion Research Foundation. Cambridge, MA: American Schools of Oriental Research. ISBN 978-0-897-57503-4. OCLC 4775395.

== Festschrift ==
- Miller, Patrick D.; Hanson, Paul D.; McBride, Samuel Dean, eds. (1987). Ancient Israelite Religion: Essays in Honor of Frank Moore Cross. Minneapolis, MN: Augsburg Fortress Publishing. ISBN 978-0-800-60831-6.

== See also ==
- Discoveries in the Judaean Desert
