= Hancock Professor of Hebrew =

Endowed chair at Harvard University

The Hancock Chair of Hebrew and Other Oriental Languages is an endowed chair at Harvard University in the US. The execution of the will of Thomas Hancock, the prosperous merchant who was uncle to John Hancock, in 1764 at a salary of £1000 established the chair. Unlike prior endowed chairs, the money for the endowed professorship came from a merchant born in the American colonies. It is the third oldest endowed chair in the United States and the first professorship dedicated to study of Semitic languages like Hebrew and Arabic. The Hancock Chair is the third oldest endowed professorship at Harvard University.

== Duties ==
In 1880, the Hancock Chair of Hebrew and Other Oriental Languages advanced the linguistic curricula by introducing further Semitic languages beyond Hebrew including Aramaic, Arabic, and Ethiopic to be taught at Harvard. The chair historically required the professor be a Protestant, have at least a Master of Arts degree, and instruct students in the Ancient Near Eastern languages, especially Hebrew and Biblical Aramaic ('Chaldee'). The professor was required to provide public lectures in the chapel once per week as well as offer private instruction two to three hours per week to pupils.

== Chairholders and denomination ==
- Stephen Sewall (orientalist) (June 19, 1765 – 1785); Congregationalist
- Eliphalet Pearson (1786–1806);
- Sidney Willard (1807–1831);
- George R. Noyes (1840–1868); Unitarian
- Crawford Toy (1880–1909); Southern Baptist
- David Gordon Lyon (1910–1922); Baptist
- William Rosenzweig Arnold (1922–1929); Wesleyan
- Robert H. Pfeiffer (1953–1958); Methodist
- Frank Moore Cross, Jr. (1958–1992); Baptist
- Peter Machinist (1992– ); Jewish
