= 1969–1970 Harvard University anti-Vietnam War protests =

Overview of events related to the Vietnam War occurring in Harvard university

During the Vietnam War, Harvard University was the site of a number of protests against both the war generally and Harvard's connections to the war specifically.

== General unrest ==
As part of the wider anti-war movement of the 1960s, student organisations such as the Harvard chapter of the Students for a Democratic Society (SDS) ran anti-war activities on campus. In November 1966 for instance, Secretary of Defense Robert McNamara was prevented from leaving the campus by a group of about 800 students. Forced from his car, he was hoisted up on the hood of a convertible, where he agreed to answer questions from the crowd on the Vietnam War. A letter signed by 2,700 Harvard undergraduates apologising to McNamara was sent to him a few days after.

A year later, in October 1967, a recruitment visit by Dow Chemicals, which supplied napalm to the military, was interrupted by protests. The Harvard Reserve Officer Training Corps (ROTC) programs drew particular attention, with sit-ins disrupting their meetings. Although the faculty was willing to reduce the programs’ privileges, the Harvard Corporation refused to terminate it. These developments, alongside the creation of a degree program in Afro-American studies, led to the events of April 1969.

== 1969: Occupation of University Hall ==
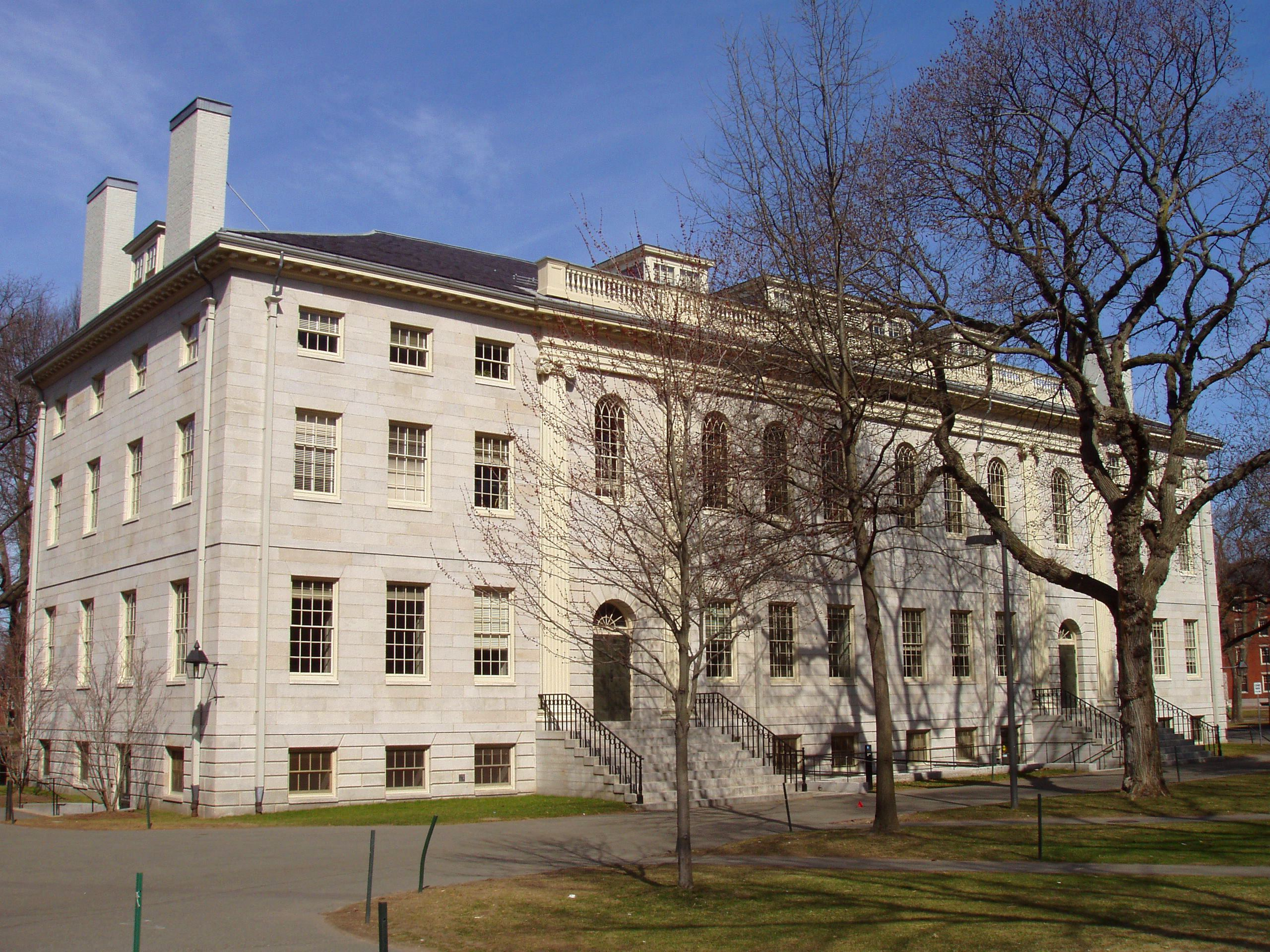
University Hall in 2007

On the night of April 8 to 9, a group of about 300 students, led by the SDS, tacked a list of demands on the door of the home of Nathan Pusey, then President of Harvard. Not only did it call for the abolition of ROTC, but also for lower rent and student involvement in designing the curriculum for the Afro-American studies degree. The demands were later rejected by Pusey as baseless. At noon on April 9, a group of 30 to 70 students entered University Hall, ejecting administrative staff and faculty. While most left the building peacefully, some faculty like assistant dean Archie Epps were forcefully expelled. At 4:15pm Harvard Yard was closed off by the administration, citing safety concerns. The occupiers were threatened with criminal prosecution and disciplinary action if they did not leave by 4:30. The Boston Globe estimated the number of students inside University Hall to now be about 500, with at least 3000 onlookers in the Yard. At 5pm, a meeting between moderate students and Dean Fred Glimp was convened at Lowell Lecture Hall, both agreeing on a peaceful resolution of the conflict.

At 10pm on April 9, Pusey decided to call in city and state police for help. At 4:45am on April 10, the mayor of Cambridge, Walter Sullivan, warned the occupiers to leave, before sending over 400 police officers in at 5am. Estimates on the number of people arrested vary between 100, 196, and 300. Amongst them were a number of press people, who got released immediately. At least 75 persons were injured, of which about 50 were treated at hospitals. Most of those arrested were charged with trespassing, of whom around 170 were fined twenty dollars. Three were charged with assault and battery, and two were sentenced to nine months in jail.

Robert Tonis, chief of the Harvard University Police, believing the police intervention to be unwarranted, spoke with the occupiers, apologising for the actions of the police. The Faculty of Arts and Sciences were quick to condemn the intervention of the police, while also criticising the occupation. A number of students were expelled, some of them without the possibility of reapplication. The reaction of the press was mixed: While most were critical of the occupation, some outlets like Newsweek said that faculty and students should have been consulted before police were called in.

In the aftermath of the occupation, a series of reforms began. The ROTC lost the privileges not held by other extracurricular activities by a vote of the faculty later endorsed by the Harvard Corporation. Student representatives got a role in the appointment of faculty for Afro-American studies. A special "Committee of Fifteen" was formed to deal with the participants of the occupation. Unusual for a faculty board, it was not appointed, but elected by the Faculty of Arts and Sciences, consisting of ten of its members and augmented by five students, three from the College and one each of Radcliffe College and the Graduate School. Harvard President Nathan Pusey estimated the damage from the occupation to amount to approximately two professors' annual salaries.

== 1970: Harvard Square riots ==
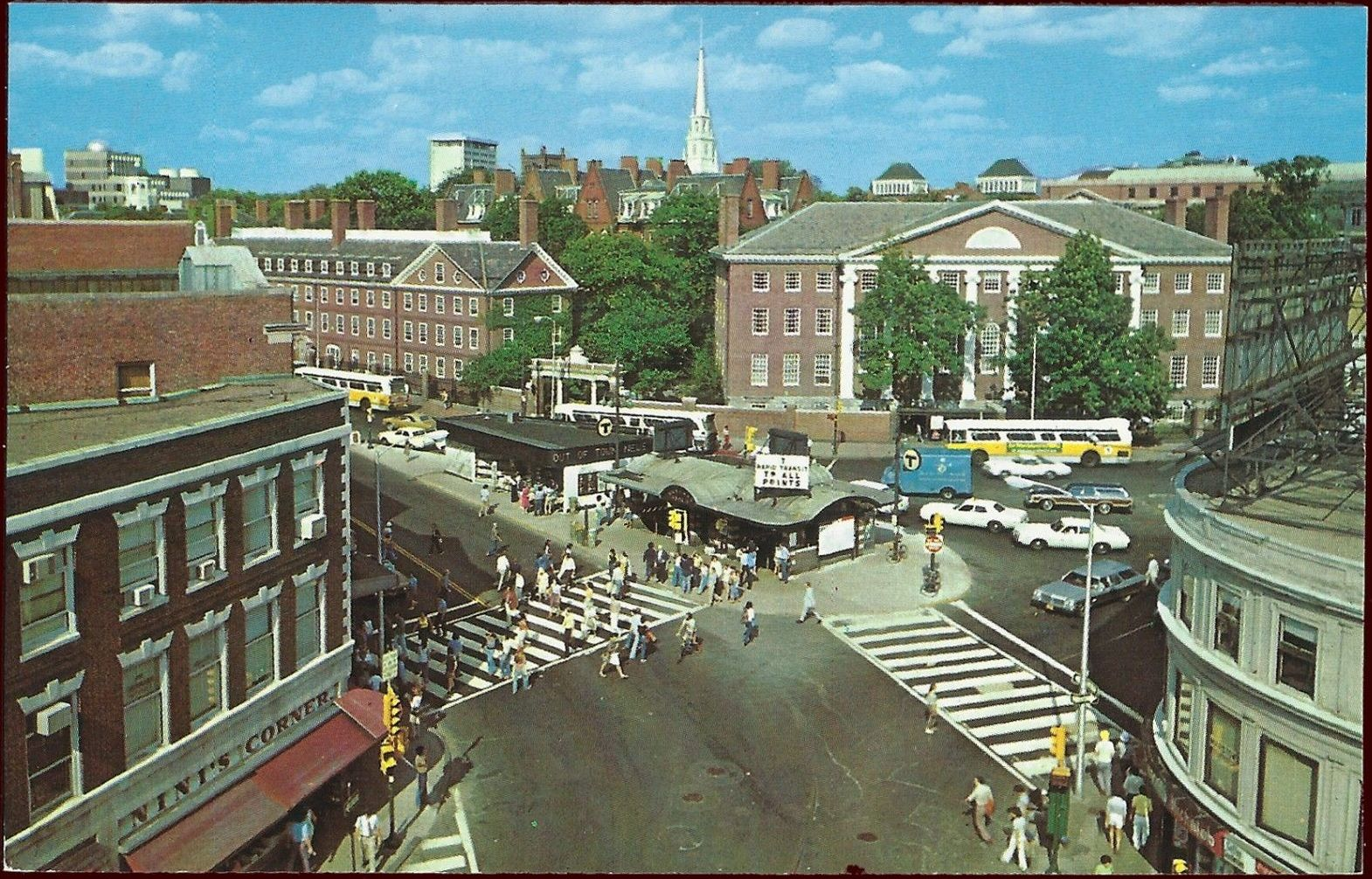
Harvard Square in the 1970s, Harvard Yard is in the background.

After the Students for a Democratic Society fractured in 1970, multiple groups emerged from the Harvard chapter, the more moderate of which was the November Action Coalition. It secured a permit to organize a parade on April 15, 1970, protesting the trial of Black Panther leader Bobby Seale, as well as being part of a broader anti-war effort. The date was significant, because the rally also protested against using tax money for war efforts and April 15 is the final day to file federal income tax returns in the United States.

The march to Harvard Yard was described by The New York Times as largely peaceful, with rocks being thrown sporadically. A sound truck encouraged participants to "go all the way to Harvard Square – where the enemies are". The number of protesters was estimated to be around 1,500 by the time they entered Harvard Square at 7pm. At 7:20pm, the street lights were turned off and police formed a line, wearing masks and no badges. Some protesters started rioting, throwing bricks, smashing windows, setting fires and taunting Harvard University students watching from their dormitories. While two buildings and two police cars were set on fire, fire trucks were able to quickly extinguish these. The roughly 2,000 police officers present started charging the protesters at 8:19pm, firing tear gas and occasionally throwing back bricks thrown at them. The streets were cleared at about 1am and the 2,000 National Guard soldiers who were standing by at their Boston and Cambridge armouries were dismissed at 2am. A curfew imposed that evening was lifted at 6am.

At least 314 people were treated for injuries at hospitals, including 35 policemen. 70 of those injuries were serious lacerations or bone fractures. The damages were estimated at $100,000 (equivalent to $810,000 in 2024) by the Cambridge city manager James L. Sullivan. Harvard University officials maintained that few Harvard students were involved and promised to provide legal assistance to any students arrested.

Future Supreme Court Justice Clarence Thomas was at this event, and credits it for his becoming disillusioned with leftist movements and beginning his turn towards conservatism.

== Bombing of the Harvard Semitic Museum ==
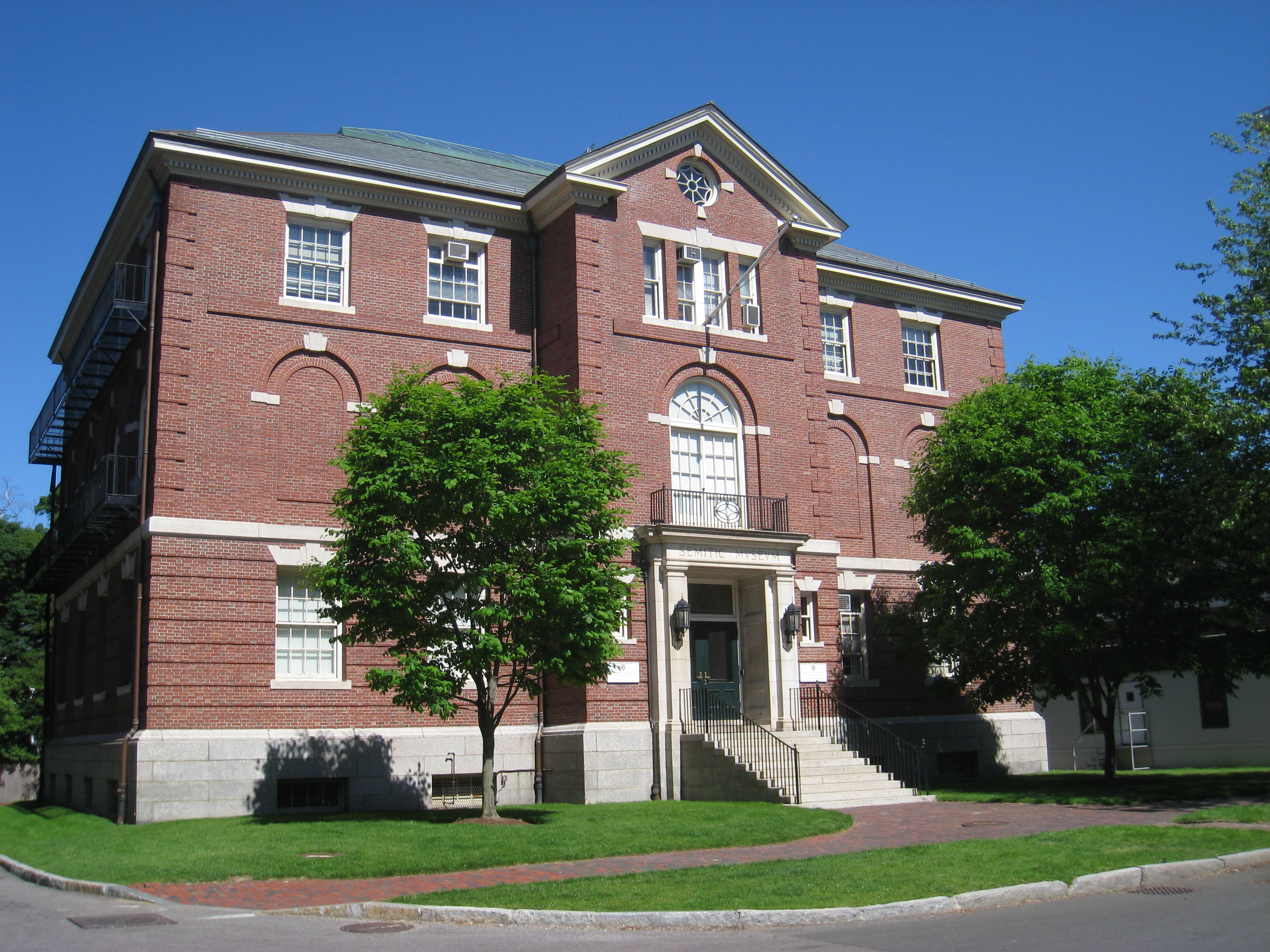
The Harvard Museum of the Ancient Near East in 2008

The Harvard Semitic Museum, now the Harvard Museum of the Ancient Near East, housed the Center for International Affairs (CFIA) on the top floors of its building. It provided economic advisory to developing countries and conducted research on international issues, but it was accused by the Students for a Democratic Society in 1965 as supporting the anti-Communist regime in Indonesia. Henry Kissinger was an Associate Director at the Center, but was working as Richard Nixon's National Security Advisor at the time of the bombing. These factors made the CFIA and by extension the building in which it was housed a prime target for anti-war groups.

On October 14, 1970, a few minutes after 1am, a bomb placed in the desk of an Army colonel visiting Harvard for independent study, exploded on the third floor of the museum. Roughly 25 minutes earlier, a woman telephoned a warning to the Harvard Police. No one was in the building at that time.

In a letter sent to Boston news outlets the following day, the Proud Eagle Tribe claimed responsibility, describing themselves as a group of "revolutionary women" aiming to destroy "Amerikan [sic] imperialism". Museum staff had seen two unidentified young women in the building about 4 pm the day before the bombing. The FBI investigated but the case was not solved.

== See also ==
- Occupy Harvard for similar political activities at Harvard University
- History of Harvard University
