= List of Harvard University named chairs =

This is a list of notable named chairs at Harvard University:

- Boylston Professor of Rhetoric and Oratory
- Gardiner Professor of Oceanic History and Affairs
- Hancock Professor of Hebrew and Other Oriental languages
- Hollis Professor of Divinity
- Hollis Chair of Mathematicks and Natural Philosophy
- McLean Professor of Ancient and Modern History
- Perkins Professorship of Astronomy and Mathematics
- Rumford Chair of Physics
- Samuel Zemurray, Jr. and Doris Zemurray Stone-Radcliffe Professor
- Wales Professor of Sanskrit
- Winn Professorship of Ecclesiastical History
