= Occupy Harvard =

Student demonstration

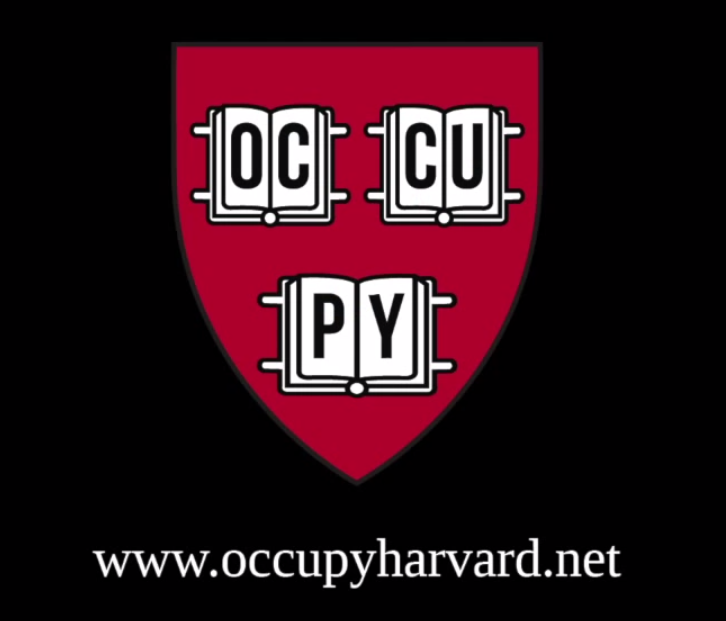
Occupy Harvard logo

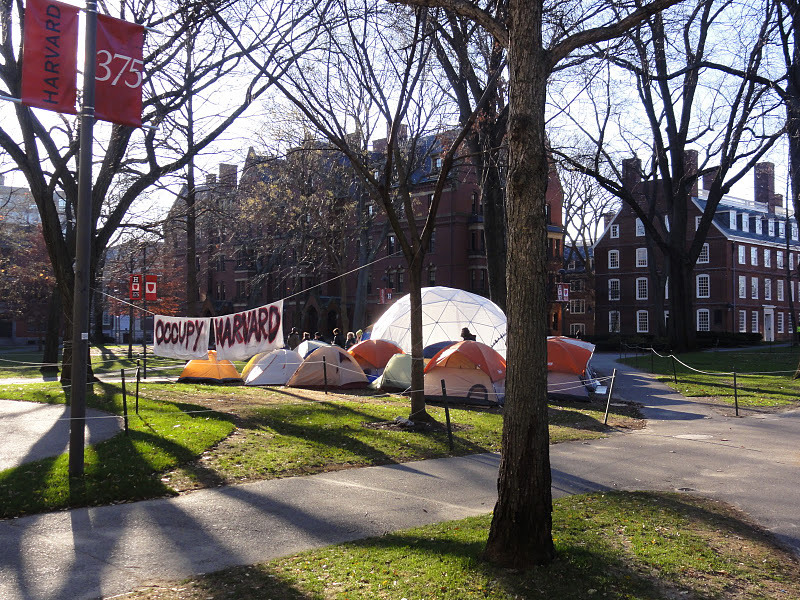
Occupy Harvard tents and banner on Harvard Yard in November 2012

Occupy Harvard was a student demonstration at Harvard University identifying itself with the global Occupy Movement. It sought to create a forum for discussing economic inequality at Harvard, in the United States, and throughout the world. It criticized Harvard's influence on global economic policy and its involvement with the American financial sector. It also supported wage campaigns by Harvard workers and a divestment demand initiated by Hotel Workers Rising.

Facing resistance from administration and police, the group established an encampment in Harvard Yard after a march on November 9, 2011. Immediately after this march, the gates to Harvard Yard were locked and only people with Harvard identity cards were allowed through. Although the encampment gained many faculty supporters, it was not popular among Harvard undergraduates. The security checkpoints were not removed until after the group packed up its tents in December 2011. Occupy Harvard continued to organize into 2012, with a focus on the university's library system.

The demonstration raised issues of privilege and economic inequality, particularly as they relate to students and administration at one of the world's wealthiest and best-known universities. Supporters described Occupy Harvard as a "fight for Harvard's soul", questioning whether the university would "continue to prioritize money above social justice". Opponents called the demonstrators over-privileged and under-informed attention seekers.

== Background ==
Harvard University is one of the most exclusive universities in the world, with an admission rate of 5.9%. Harvard is famous for its wealthy graduates but also for its generous financial aid programs. Its financial endowment of over $30 billion, on which it does not pay taxes, is the largest in the world. It is one of the world's richest non-profits, competing only with the Catholic Church (and perhaps the Bill & Melinda Gates Foundation).

Many Harvard graduates work in the financial sector based on Wall Street; many others hold prominent positions in the world of business. Prominent faculty such as former president Larry Summers—who become director of the National Economic Council under Obama—have played major roles in shaping United States economic policy. This status has led critics to connect Harvard closely with America's domestic and international economic policies. Harvard's investments have also come under scrutiny (as they did during divestment campaigns targeting apartheid in South Africa), with particular criticism leveled at holdings in HEI Hotels & Resorts.

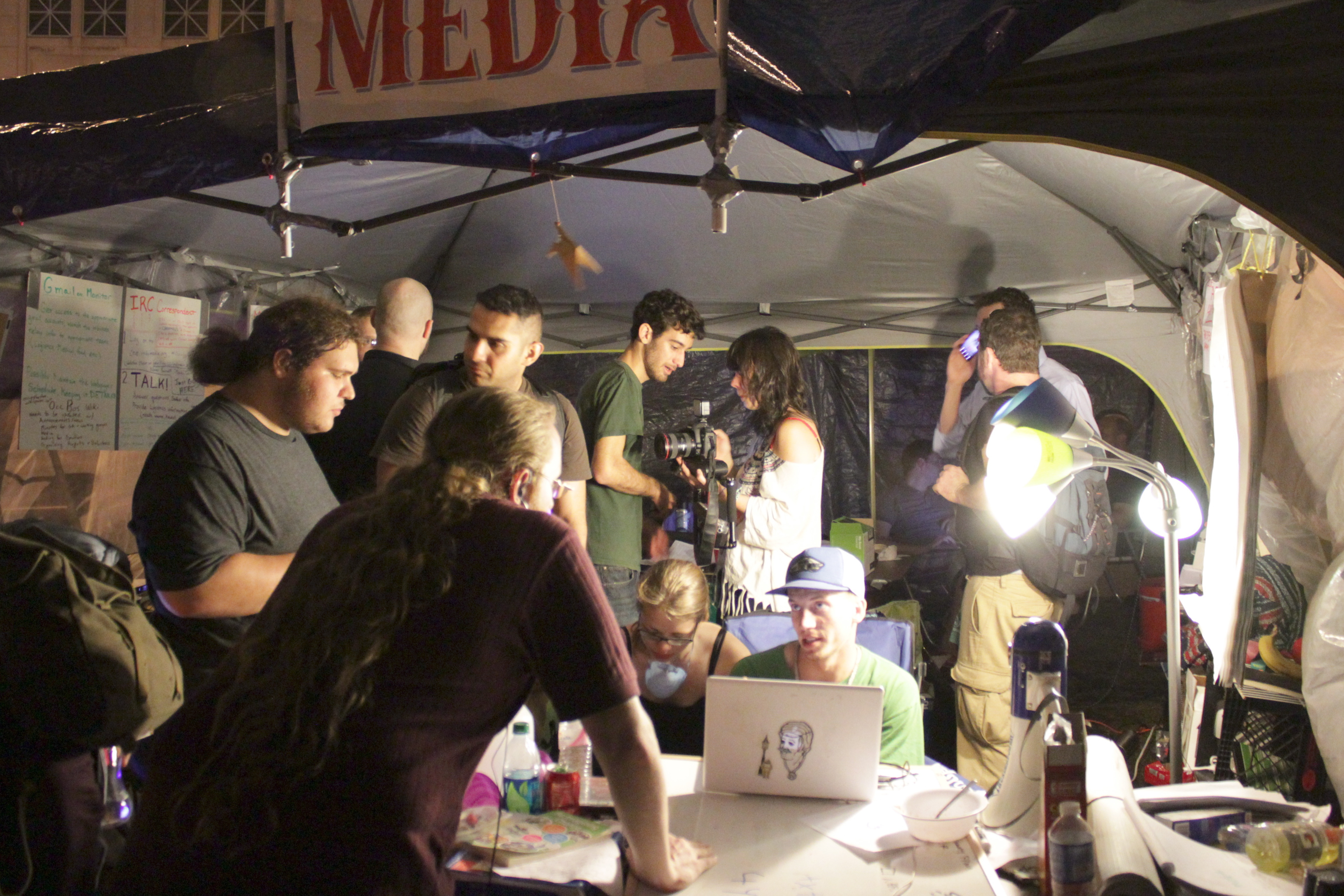
Nighttime at the Occupy Boston media tent

Harvard has been the site of workers' campaigns, notably the long-term Harvard Living Wage Campaign which peaked in 2001. This movement—which established an open 100-tent shantytown in Harvard Yard—won concessions from Harvard including the formation of a jobs committee and a moratorium on outsourcing. In general, student activism at Harvard is limited to official channels. Although many Harvard students are involved in community service or public policy, these avenues for change have been criticized (in the words of a queer student activist at Harvard) as "technocratic," and oriented towards "research solutions, policy solutions, economic solutions, bureaucratic solutions to all problems rather than any type of social movement". Another student said, "It’s uncomfortable to acknowledge one’s own privilege and position—it can feel like a personal attack."

Occupy Wall Street (itself inspired by the Arab Spring) began on September 17, 2011, sparking a wave of public encampments that came to be known as the Occupy Movement. Students at Harvard began organizing in response to that movement, and began to collaborate with the Occupy Boston encampment established on September 30, 2011. Harvard workers, many of them members of Local 615 (SEIU) and Local 26 (UNITE HERE!), also joined with Occupy Boston and helped to plan Occupy Harvard. The Harvard Crimson generally opposed the Occupy actions, and defended police officers who arrested Harvard students at Occupy Boston.

=== Ec 10 walkout ===
On Wednesday, November 2, 2011, about 70 students walked out of Economics 10 ("Ec 10"), Harvard's introductory economics class taught by N. Gregory Mankiw, former economic advisor to George W. Bush and then-current advisor to Mitt Romney. Demonstrators expressed support for Occupy Wall Street and published an open letter to Mankiw:

Harvard graduates play major roles in the financial institutions and in shaping public policy around the world. If Harvard fails to equip its students with a broad and critical understanding of economics, their actions are likely to harm the global financial system. The last five years of economic turmoil have been proof enough of this. We are walking out today to join a Boston-wide march protesting the corporatization of higher education as part of the global Occupy movement. Since the biased nature of Economics 10 contributes to and symbolizes the increasing economic inequality in America, we are walking out of your class today both to protest your inadequate discussion of basic economic theory and to lend our support to a movement that is changing American discourse on economic injustice.

The letter criticized Mankiw's class specifically for presenting a conservative perspective as absolute truth, and for excluding academic data and primary sources (relying heavily, instead on Mankiw's own textbook). Students cited, for example, Mankiw's claim that economics dictated a zero-sum relationship between economic efficiency and economic equality. The walkout immediately produced heated debate about Harvard and Ec 10, in particular the question of whether the class really separates "descriptive" from "normative" claims. An Occupy organizer who supported the walkout said that the class promotes a "strongly conservative neoliberal ideology"; the secretary for the Harvard Republican Club said that "the class is about pure economic efficiency. Ideology comes into play when we determine how to balance efficiency with social equity."

Mankiw said that his course was a "relatively apolitical" introduction to economics, that he was planning to teach a lecture on inequality, a topic that might interest the protestors, and that he could "understand their desire to think about alternative ways to structure society".

== Encampment ==
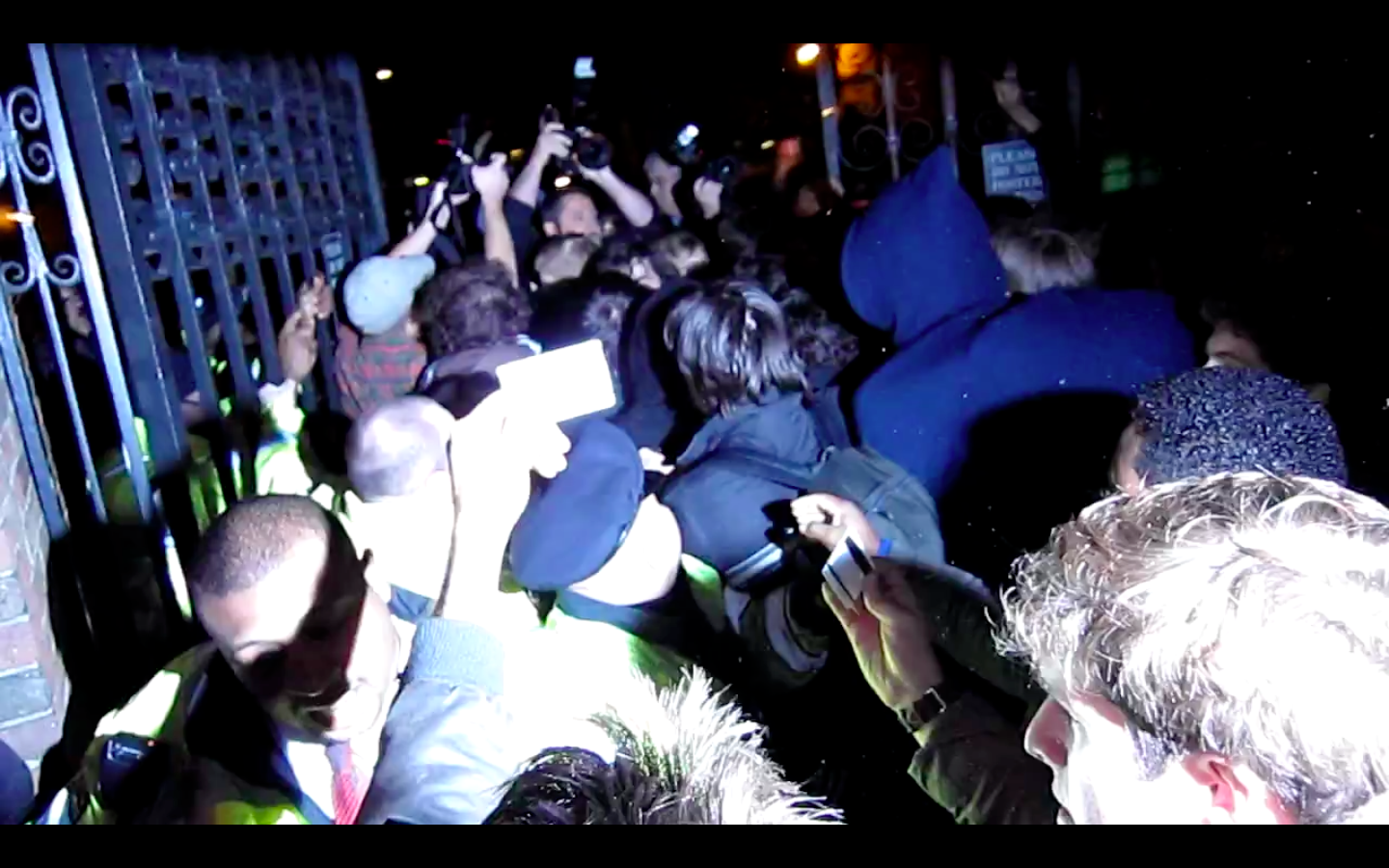
Marchers displaying Harvard identity cards attempt to enter Thayer gate as police begin to close it

On November 9, 2011, hundreds of demonstrators (estimates range between 300 and 500; not all of them Harvard students) met at Harvard Law School and marched toward Harvard Yard. After allowing through some students with identity cards, Harvard Police closed the gates on all of the protestors. Some reported police roughness and minor injuries. Those who entered the Yard set up tents that had been stored previously in nearby dormitories, establishing a camp near the Yard's John Harvard statue.

The next morning (November 10), the group issued an official statement which included specific criticisms of Harvard management:

We see injustice in the 180:1 ratio between the compensation of Harvard’s highest-paid employee—the head of internal investments at Harvard Management Company—and the lowest-paid employee, an entry-level custodial worker. We see injustice in Harvard’s adoption of corporate efficiency measures such as job outsourcing. We see injustice in African land grabs that displace local farmers and devastate the environment. We see injustice in Harvard’s investment in private equity firms such as HEI Hotels and Resorts, which profits off the backbreaking labor of a non-union immigrant workforce. We see injustice in Harvard’s lack of financial transparency and its prevention of student and community voice in these investments.

The group also announced that it would make policies through a regular General Assembly.

=== Gates of Harvard Yard ===
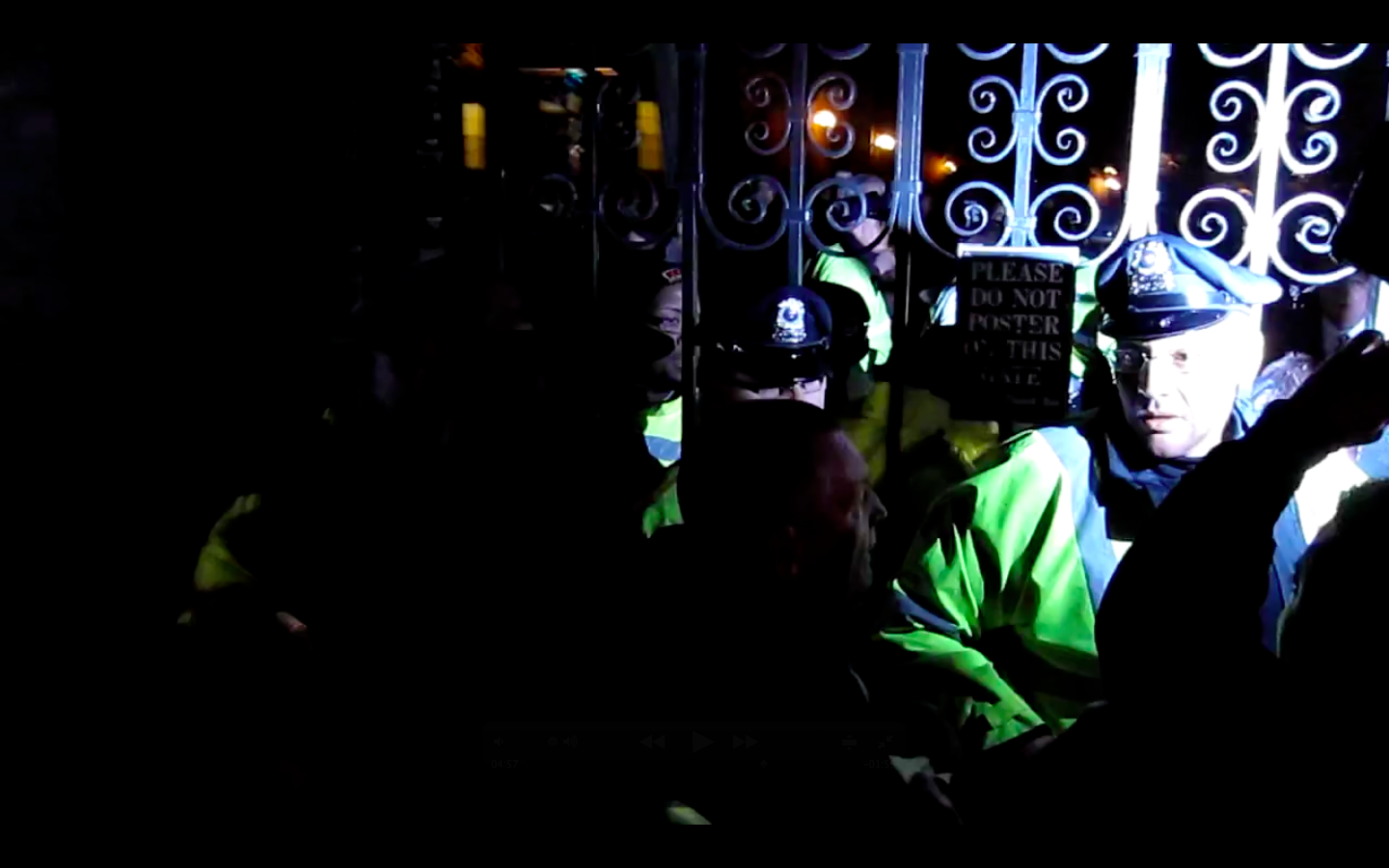
Police outside and inside the closed gate

While the tents were standing, Harvard administrators kept the gates locked—during this time, no one was allowed into Harvard Yard without appropriate identification. A November 14 statement attributed this decision to "health and safety issues that have arisen elsewhere". Those who held Occupy Harvard responsible for the locked gate maintained that it was necessary to prevent the mayhem (rape, assault, drugs, and more) that occurred at other Occupy encampments. With the gates closed and attendance restricted to Harvard students, the Occupy Harvard encampment may have been one of the most orderly and polite in the nation. According to reporter John Stephen Dwyer:

The shutting of Harvard’s gates has determined the character of the protest and the criticism made against it. Whereas Occupy Boston has attracted all kinds of wild characters, the atmosphere at Occupy Harvard is calm and polite. The occupiers are almost invariably well-groomed and articulate. The donation jar took in $130 one day, most of it in $20 bills, and it didn’t disappear when no one had their eye on it.
It is, to use a word popular in Dewey Square, "bougy" (fancy, bourgeois). Many holders of Harvard IDs have a decent shot of joining the 1% if they weren’t already born into it. The occupiers in the Yard say this privilege – earned through hard work in many cases, inherited in others – gives them more obligation to try to fix the system rather than less.

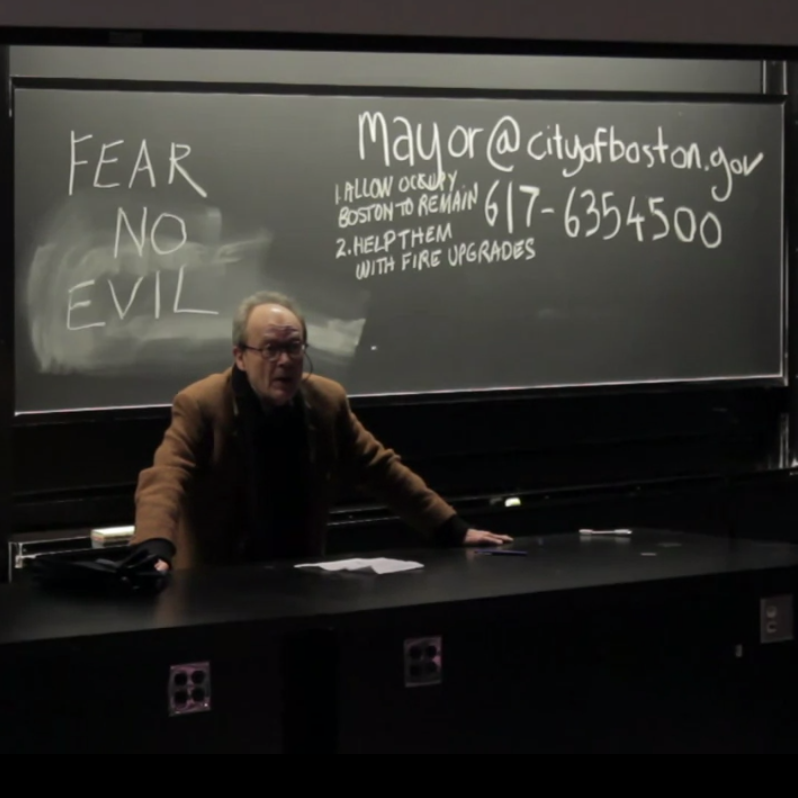
Professor John Womack (Harvard class of 1959) lectures Occupy Harvard at a December 7, 2011 teach-in, urging the audience to learn more about the 99% they wish to engage and assist

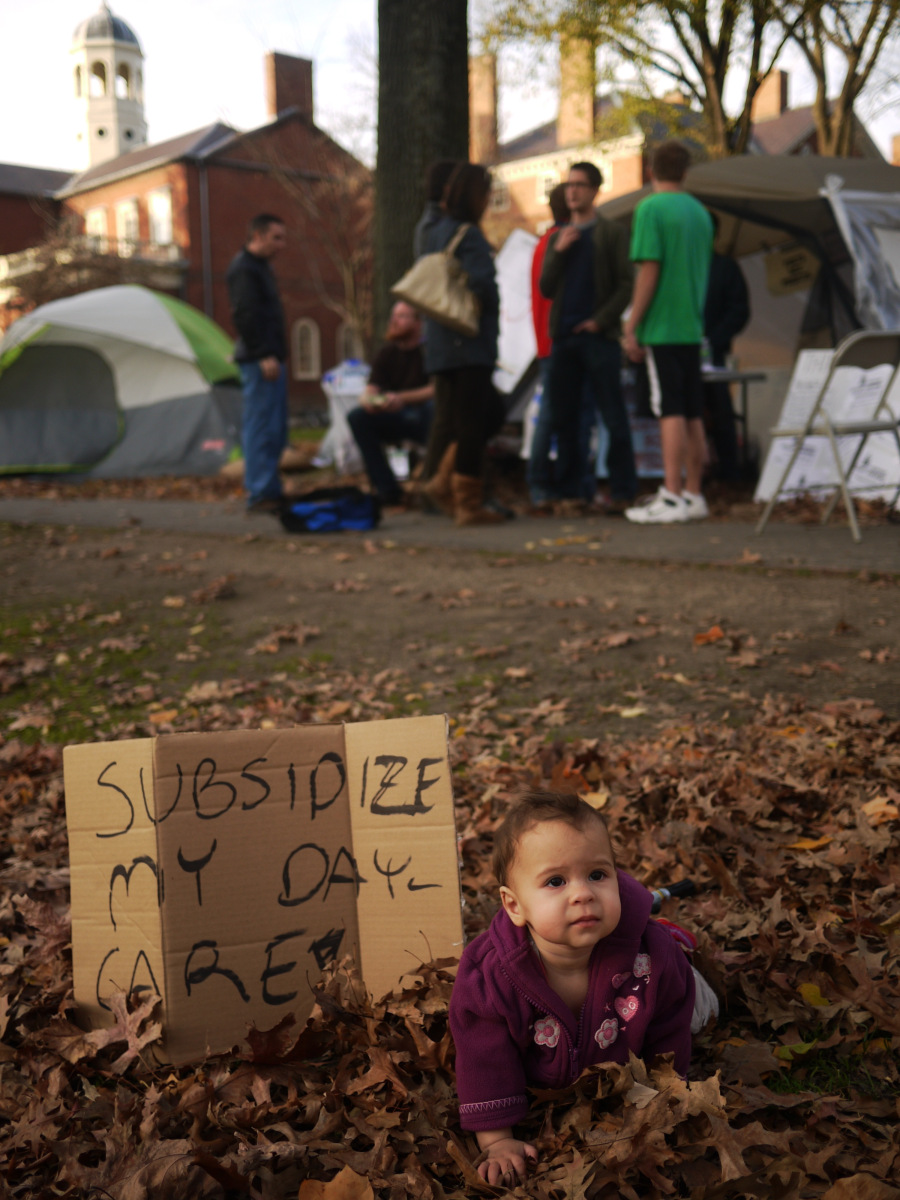
"Subsidize my daycare" sign

Supporters of the demonstration criticized the gate closure, saying that the administration was reinforcing its elitist image and "shutting down" the university by preventing free flow of people and dialogue. Faculty supporters published open letters to Harvard President Drew Faust asking her to reopen the gates. One group of professors connected to Romance Language programs at Harvard wrote:

We sympathize with your difficult position, but all of us agree that locking the gates is contrary to the principle of open inquiry for which the university stands. Historically, Harvard has never locked its gates (at least, not in recent memory), and we believe that security issues can be addressed differently. We do not share the perception that the Occupy movement constitutes a threat to Harvard. To the contrary, we are in sympathy with protests against increasing inequality in the United States and believe that Harvard should welcome discussions of the issue.

Law professor Duncan Kennedy said that "the massive security presence, albeit friendly enough, had a Homeland Security feel to it." Francis Xavier Clooney, a Jesuit priest at Harvard Divinity School, described the demonstration as a "Vigil" and called the security "unduly strict, disproportionate, unnecessary". To the irritation of students opposed to the demonstration, some professors held classes outside the gates to protest their closure. Many students, tourists, and local businesses complained about the gates, which were locked for a month and a half. Relatives of students and members of the press were also excluded.

=== Tents ===
The tents themselves served what organizers called a "symbolic" role, since members of Occupy Harvard continued attending school and work during the encampment. Some students criticized participants for not being present with the tents. (Many students themselves felt conflicted about competing obligations to the demonstration and to their academic work.) The tents were reportedly purchased with funds from the Student Labor Action Coalition, and the Service Employees International Union. The occupation consisted of 30 tents and a core group of 100 activists at Harvard.

=== Message ===
Members of Occupy Harvard used the encampment as a platform to create discussion about the university and its role in the world. Many criticized Harvard's role in the global economy and the Great Recession: "Year after year, Harvard supplies traders and analysts and financial advisers who go on to run the economy into the ground", said one participating graduate student. Occupiers also criticized finances within the university. Said one doctoral student studying slavery, "I am grateful for what the school has given me, but the lack of transparency about where all that lovely money comes from is something I do not feel comfortable with."

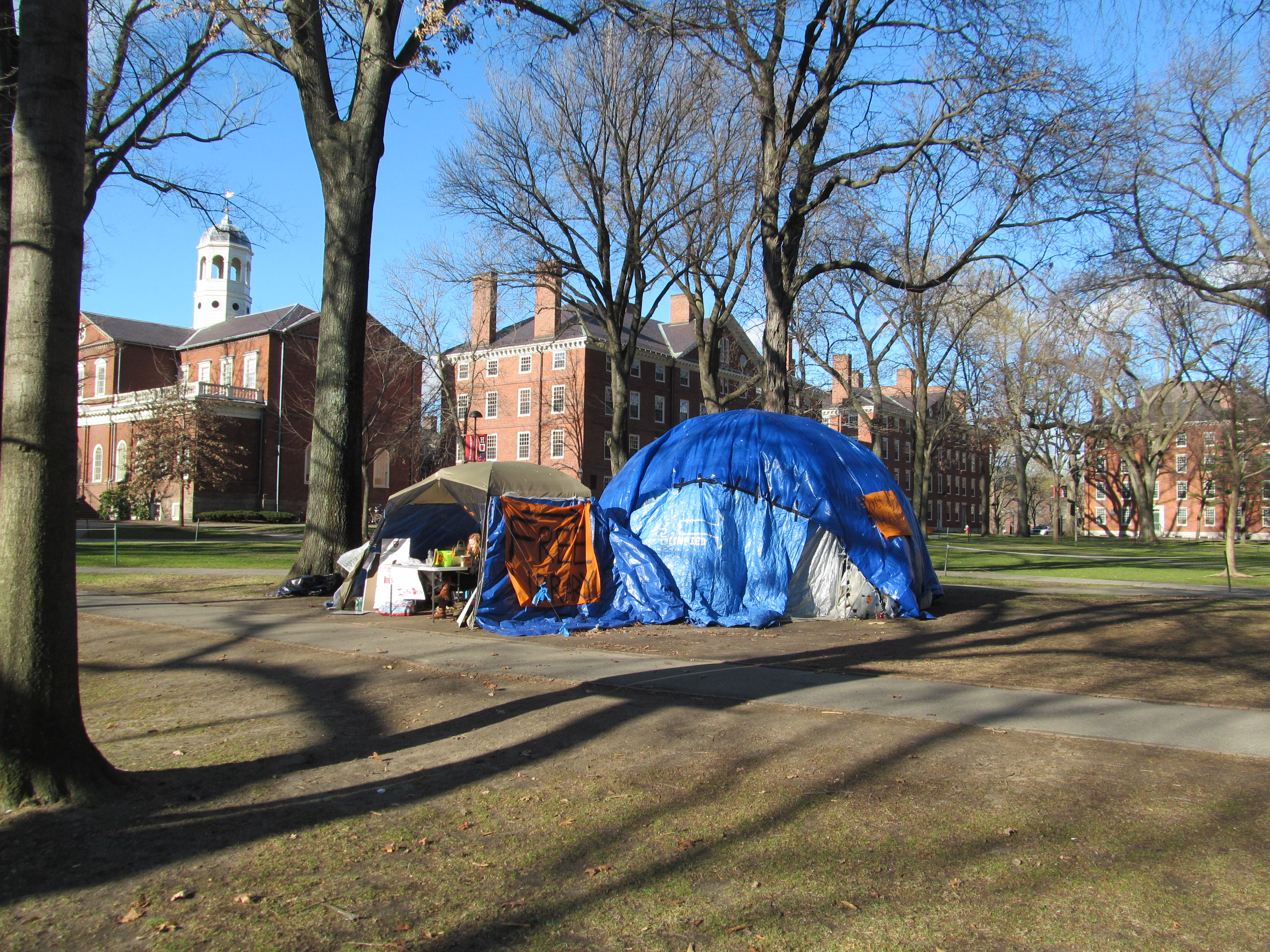
Information tent remaining in Harvard Yard at the start of January 2012

A constant theme, connected to the broader Occupy slogan of "people over profits", was the desire for Harvard to prioritize educating the populace above money. One post-doc said that Occupy Harvard's "goal is to reaffirm Harvard as a marketplace of ideas where all viewpoints are discussed and analyzed without regard to the amount of money supporting the different ideas". When journalist Chris Hedges addressed the group (outside the gates, so that others could attend), he stressed the symbolic importance of Occupy Harvard to a larger struggle against plutocracy.

=== Departure ===
On Monday, December 12, 2011, Occupy Harvard chose to strike its Harvard Yard camp, citing winter weather and a desire for the Yard's gates to reopen. Harvard Yard was reopened—during daytime hours—on December 22, 2011.

The group maintained its information tent, a single weather-proof dome, until administrators ordered the structure removed on Friday, January 13, 2012. A "crafts working group" created miniature tents out of paper to display on the site.

== Positions ==
=== Finance recruiting ===
Occupy Harvard denounced finance industry, which it described as bad for the economy and a source of inequality. Campus opposition to corporate recruiting has increased, with some describing it as similar to military recruiting. Recent declines in recruitment rates for the finance sector have been attributed partly to the growing sense that these jobs are undesirable and unethical.

On Monday, November 28, 2011, Occupy Harvard conducted a "Rally to Defend Freedom of Speech" in Harvard Yard. The group expressed solidarity with UC Berkeley and UC Davis, where students had recently come into conflict with police. About 25 of the demonstrators proceeded from the Yard to a Goldman Sachs recruiting session, behind held at Harvard's "On-Campus Interview Facility". They stood outside and chanted "Goldman Sachs, you can't hide / We can see your greedy side!" Students who attempted to enter were denied access to the building by Harvard Police and Office of Career Services officials, even after showing identity cards.

Goldman Sachs canceled recruiting events scheduled for December 8, 2011, reportedly in response to the demonstration. The Crimson criticized the demonstrators for singling out Goldman Sachs and for attempting to create animosity towards their peers bound for jobs in finance.

=== Janitors ===
The group supported Harvard janitors in their campaign better wages, citing the discrepancy between pay for janitors and pay for Harvard's administrators. The janitors, unionized with SEIU Local 615, credited the Occupy group helping them to win a stronger five-year contract. The Crimson approved the new contract but criticized Occupy Harvard for "attempting to link local and global issues", writing that "discussing the custodians' contract in the context of the global Occupy movement seems misguided".

=== Newt Gingrich ===
Video of Occupiers "mic checking" Newt Gingrich as he begins to speak

On November 18, Occupy Harvard and Occupy Boston disrupted a speech by Newt Gingrich (then a presidential candidate) at Harvard Kennedy School. Gingrich was presenting his film A City Upon A Hill: The Spirit of American Exceptionalism, sponsored by Citizens United Productions, made famous by the Supreme Court's 2009 Citizens United ruling. Soon after Gingrich began to speak, demonstrators in the audience said "Thank you for standing up for corporations. They have rights too!" and "We are the 99 percent!" before being removed by security. Gingrich responded "I think we are 100 percent. We are all Americans." Gingrich suggested later in his speech that janitors should not be members of unions, and that their jobs should be given to children living in poverty.

=== Hotel workers ===
The group also joined with the Hotel Workers Rising campaign, pressuring Harvard to divest its holdings in HEI Hotels & Resorts. In December 2011, Harvard agreed to review its holdings in HEI—in March 2012, it agreed to divest.

=== Harvard libraries ===
In early 2012, Harvard announced imminent sweeping changes to its library system. These changes would have led to layoffs, as well as cuts in other library resources. Library workers, members of the Harvard Union of Clerical & Technical Workers (HUCTW), reacted in January with protests, with occupiers distributing petitions in support. Protestors asked leaders HUCTW, historically not an aggressive union, to back the endangered workers.

In February, three members of Occupy Harvard published a statement in The Crimson describing an ongoing forum, held in Lamont Library, to discuss the course of these changes. (This editorial parodied the official statement of President Drew Faust on the library reorganization.):

As the Harvard community confronts this transition, the New Harvard Library Working Group of Occupy Harvard has acted autonomously to open a persistent community space for critical thought, engaged learning, and insistent action in the Lamont Library Café. In doing so, we strive to fulfill the promise of this library space as an open and participatory forum for learning. […]

We think of the proposed Harvard library transition as a manifestation of the University's accession to neoliberal imperatives. Occupy, whether at Harvard or Wall Street, challenges and refuses the devastating willingness of our broken society to view humans as expendable resources and systems as ultimately beholden to profit. A future cannot be imagined in the absence of its past, present, or future constituents. A library needs the workers who are its lifeblood, its circulatory system, just as a functioning democratic society needs the voices of the 99 percent. Systems built with profit imperatives can only serve to further perpetuate the patterns of destruction and unequal power structures that we denounce. The proposed library transition not only fails to address these systemic problems, it replicates them.

We insist on an alternative vision, one that cherishes the human communities and collaborative processes that make intellectual and civic engagement—on campuses and in public parks—not only possible but also fruitful. In Lamont Library, we are creating a community of knowledge sharing that is open, horizontal, and free from the destructive impulses that too often guide our university and that seem to be shaping the library transition.

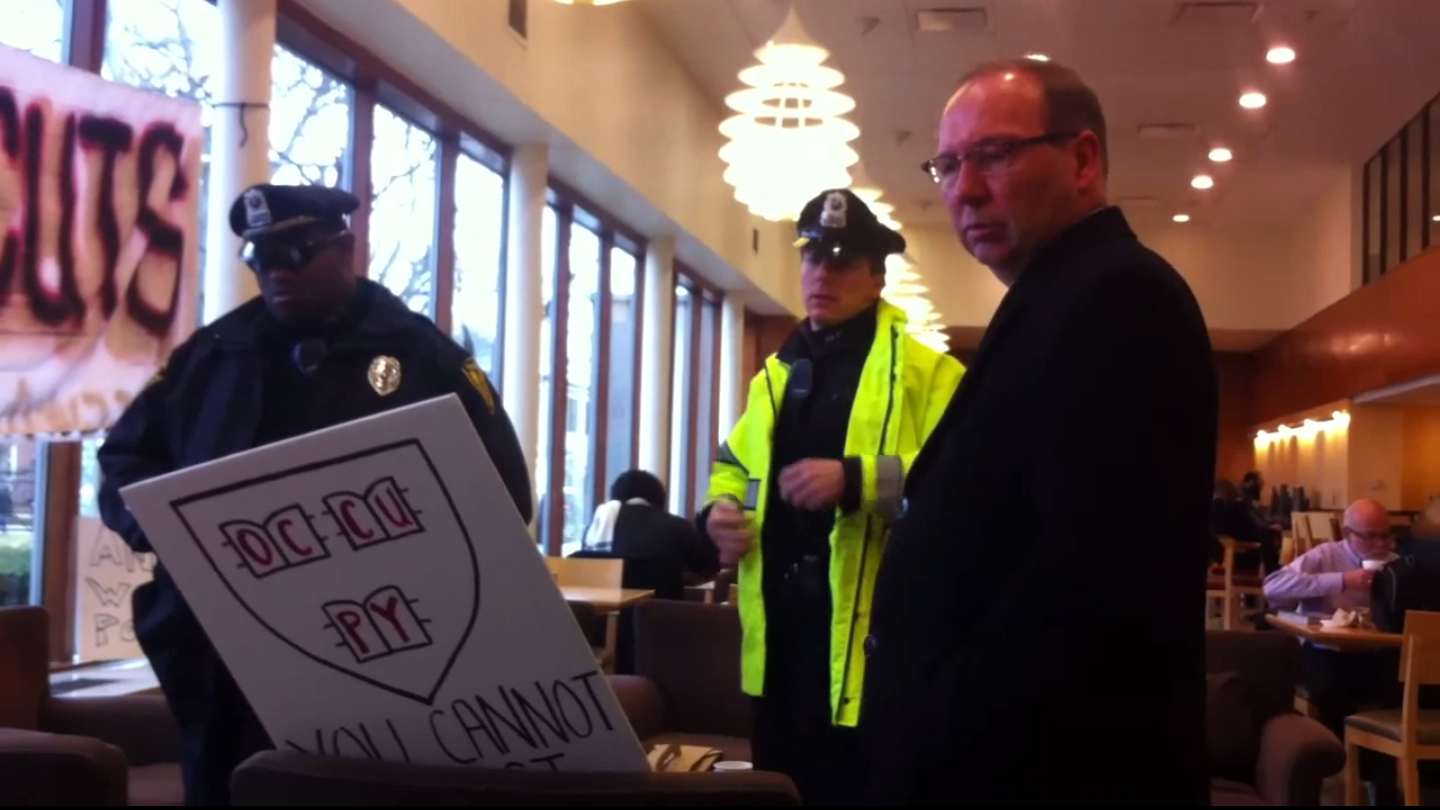
Students in Lamont Library are asked to remove a sign they have attached to the wall (still from an Occupy Harvard video)

The group announced intentions to hold Think Tanks and other meetings in the library from Sunday February 12 through Friday February 17. A major theme of the protests, was again the relationship of money to values. Topics included privatization and the larger economic ideology of neoliberalism, which occupiers said interfered with freedom and openness of education and libraries.

Administrators sought to remove Occupy Harvard from the library, threatening to revoke library access for participating students. Participants, instructed to take down signs because they violated an unwritten library policy, argued that the signs were protected by written library policy defending free speech. Police removed the protestors' signs, but did not ban anyone from the library. Harvard students quoted in the Crimson said that they were not bothered by the group and in some cases did not notice its presence.

The group held a rally outside of Lamont on Friday September 17, 2012, announcing support for library workers, holding signs, and chanting (e.g., "Hey, Harvard, you can't hide / We can see your greedy side!") Occupiers inside the library left the same day, as planned. Demonstrations around Harvard's libraries and library workers continued through Commencement 2012.

== Reception ==
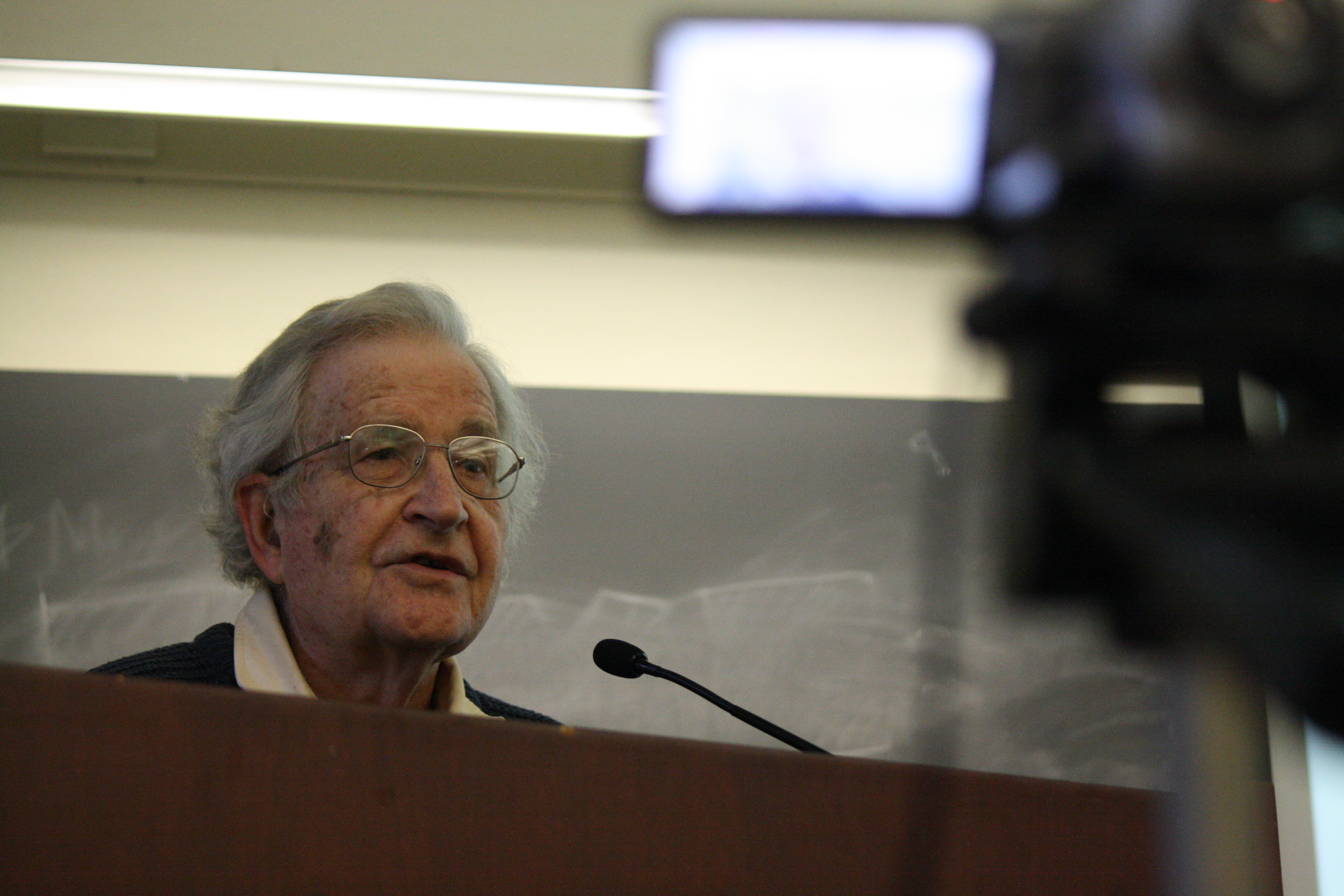
Noam Chomsky speaking to Occupy Harvard in February

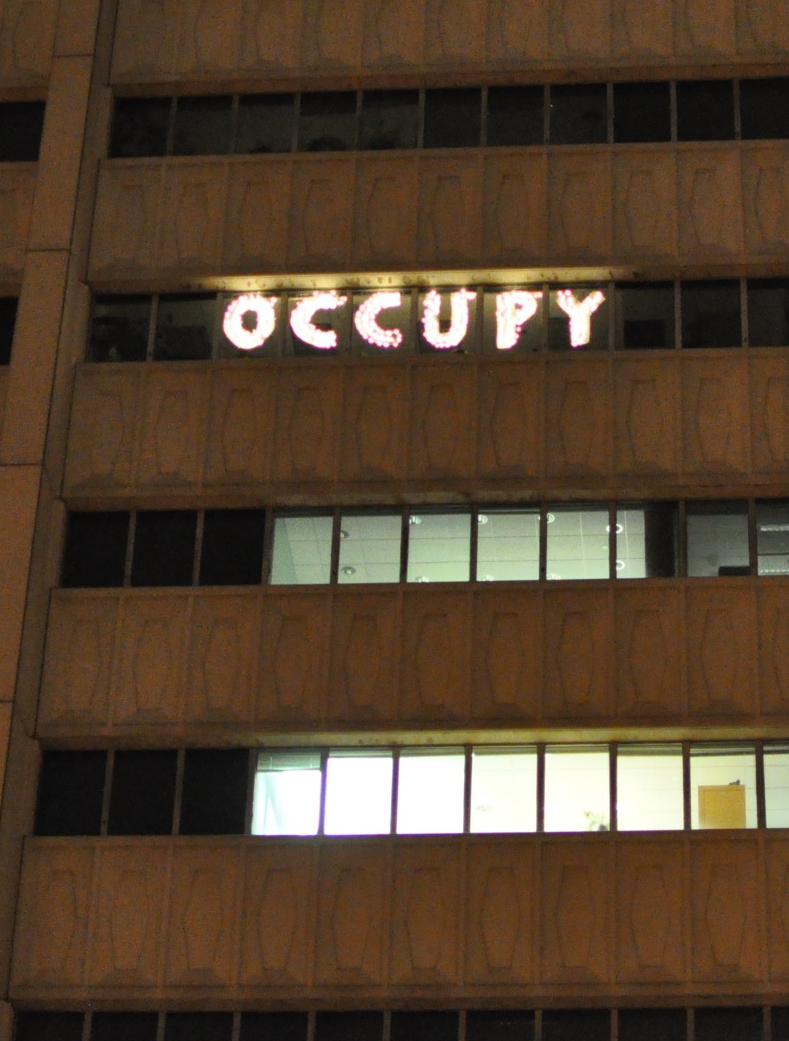
Message of support displayed at Harvard's William James Hall

Occupy Harvard received praise and criticism in The Harvard Crimson. The Crimson itself opposed the encampment and published numerous editorials urging the group to move out of Harvard Yard. Contentious issues included the possible hypocrisy of privileged Harvard students, wastefulness of the tents, and, most of all, inconvenience created by the locked gates. The Crimson also cited the possibility of anarchist violence. An editorial published by Harvard graduate Alexandra Petri (class of 2010) in the Washington Post argued that the protestors were motivated not by an authentic desire for justice but instead by need to alleviate their own feelings of elitism and guilt—urging them to "go to class" and learn something while at Harvard.

The demonstrations raised questions for Harvard students about their own role in the nation's economic elite—the so-called "1%". Even participants struggled with the question of how Harvard students could authentically express solidarity with the downtrodden of the world. Students deliberated over the effects of Harvard's comprehensive financial aid policies. Neal Gabler wrote in the New York Times that Harvard students were "superachivers", even considering the effects of financial aid. They were "likely to be wealthy, well-appointed young people groomed and professionalized at an early age precisely so they would impress admissions officers". One Harvard graduate who had already joined Occupy Boston told the Boston Globe that attending Harvard did not ensure membership in the 1%, saying: "I’m the first person in my family to go to college, and I worked hard to go to Harvard, but I feel that the way the country is now, the American dream isn’t possible.’" Some students in a dormitory near the encampment responded directly, chanting "We are the one percent" and yelling insults.

A survey conducted by students in Statistics 104 suggested that student approval of Occupy Harvard averaged 2.85 on a scale of 1–10. A petition titled "Free Harvard", which asked the occupiers to go somewhere else in order to have the Harvard Yard gates reopened, obtained 700 signatures. (Occupiers complained that the university had managed to blame demonstrations for the administration's own decision to lock the gates.) Other students expressed confusion or curiosity about the purpose of the encampment. 70 faculty members signed letters of support for the demonstration.

The group also provoked response from within. Many said it was a good first step in creating awareness about global economic issues, and creating drama and emotion around political issues (particularly as contrasted with Harvard's Institute of Politics). Others said that it picked up on struggles that already had momentum—for example, HEI divestment, which was already being championed by the Student Labor Action Movement. They stressed the importance but also the difficulty of raising awareness about economic injustice at a school for the wealthy and privileged. Some felt that the process was dominated by graduate students, particularly in its "2.0" phase that focused on the libraries. Some participants were already familiar with consensus decision-making; others were new—to its pitfalls as well as to its advantages. One student criticized Occupy Harvard for being too cautious: "Occupy Harvard is so different from the activism I’ve done in Oakland. In Oakland people don’t hesitate to strike, they don’t hesitate to do radical stuff. Here we need to discuss every nuance before we act. I’ve had to adjust my style and be more patient."

== See also ==
- Privately owned public space
- Educational privilege
- Legacy preferences
- Harvard Corporation
