= 2018 Marriott Hotels strike =

Labor strike in the United States

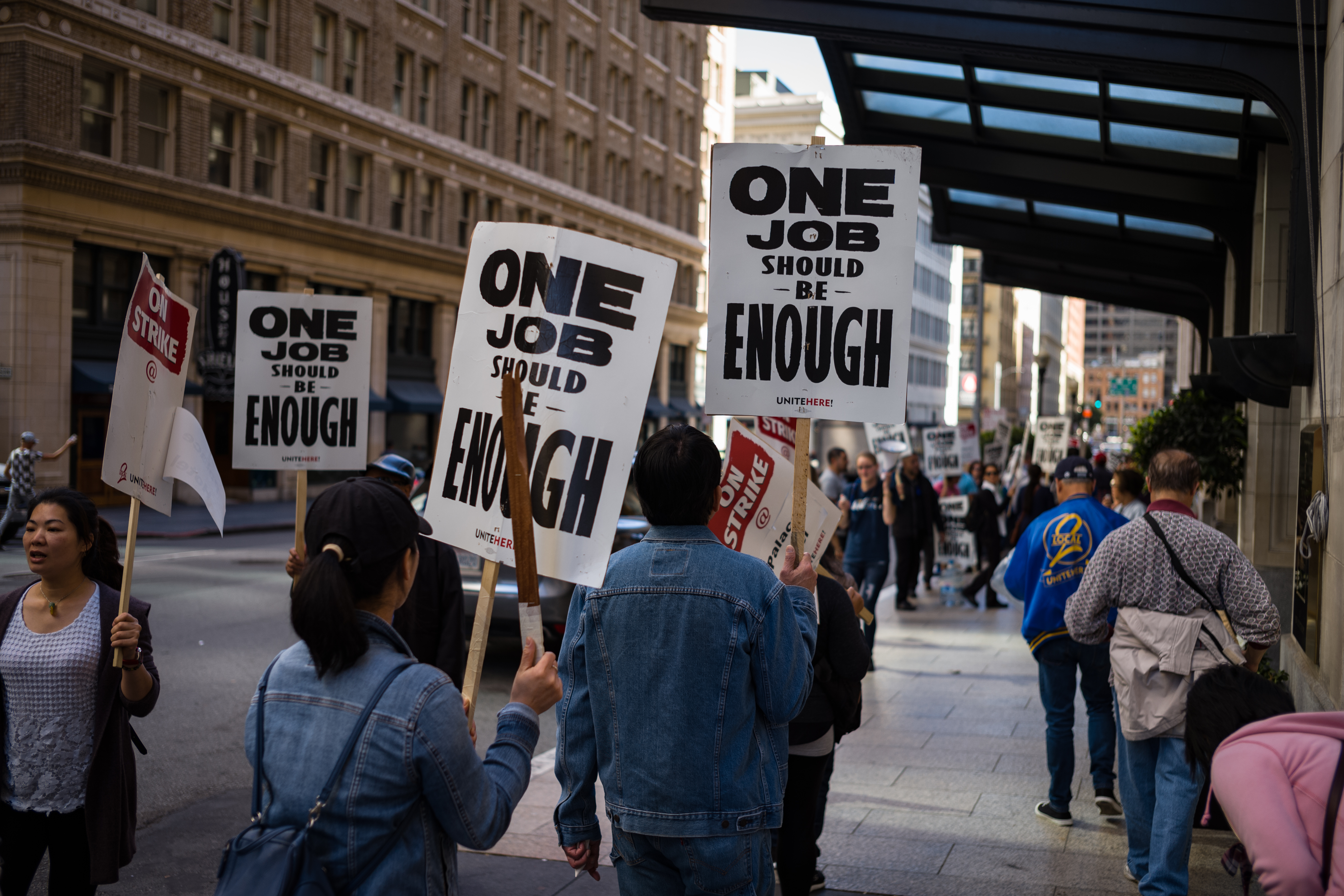
- Hotel union workers strike with the slogan "One job should be enough", San Francisco, 2018.
- Date: October 2018 – 5 December 2018
- Location: United States
- Caused by: Unsatisfactory salary
- Goals: Salary increase from 23 USD/h
- Methods: Striking
- Result: 4 USD/h raise

Parties
UNITE HERE	Marriott International

Number
More than 7,700 workers across 23 hotels	

The 2018 Marriott Hotels strike was a strike of more than 7,700 workers across the United States at 23 hotels operated by Marriott International in late 2018. The strike began in October and went through early December.

== Strike ==
Various professions across the hotel industry including housekeepers, cooks, servers, dishwashers, doormen, and concierges walked off the job as members of the UNITE HERE labor union. Their slogan was "One job should be enough", as a reference to the Fight for $15 movement in the service industry where employees are demanding a living wage. This walkout began in early October and spread to 23 Marriott hotels across the US to cities including San Francisco, Boston, Detroit, and Honolulu.

The strike ended and workers went back to work on 5 December 2018, after negotiations with Marriott.

As a result of the strike, housekeepers in San Francisco, whose median wage was US$23 per hour, received a $4 per hour raise over the four-year contract. Strikes in other cities also resulted in various new employment contracts that offered better wages and benefits, along with any workers who individually interact with guests to be receiving a silent GPS-enabled panic button for protection against sexual harassment in the workplace.

== See also ==
- 1912 New York City waiters' strike
- Hotel Workers Rising
