= David Gordon Lyon =

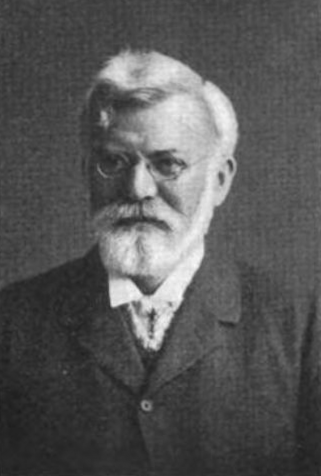
- Born: May 24, 1852; Benton, Alabama
- Died: December 4, 1935 (aged 83); Boston, Massachusetts
- Education: Howard College; Southern Baptist Theological Seminary; University of Leipzig
- Occupation: Theologian
- Spouses: Tosca Woehler (m. 1883; died 1904) Mabel E. Harris (m. 1910; died 1931)

David Gordon Lyon (May 24, 1852 – December 4, 1935) was an American theologian.

== Biography ==
David Gordon Lyon was born in Benton, Alabama on May 24, 1852, the son of a doctor. In 1875 he received his AB from Howard College in Marion, Alabama. (Howard is now Samford University and located in Birmingham). He studied at the Southern Baptist Theological Seminary under Crawford Howell Toy, and went to Germany, and received his PhD from the University of Leipzig in 1882, in the study of Syriac. While there, he met Tosca Woehler, whom he married in 1883.

He occupied the Hollis Chair at Harvard Divinity School from 1882 to 1910, when he assumed the Hancock professorship of Hebrew and other Oriental languages. Six years after Tosca Woehler's death (1904) he married Mabel E. Harris (d. 1931). He was the founding curator of the Semitic Museum. He retired from Harvard in 1921.

He died at Baker Memorial Hospital in Boston on December 4, 1935.

== Diaries ==
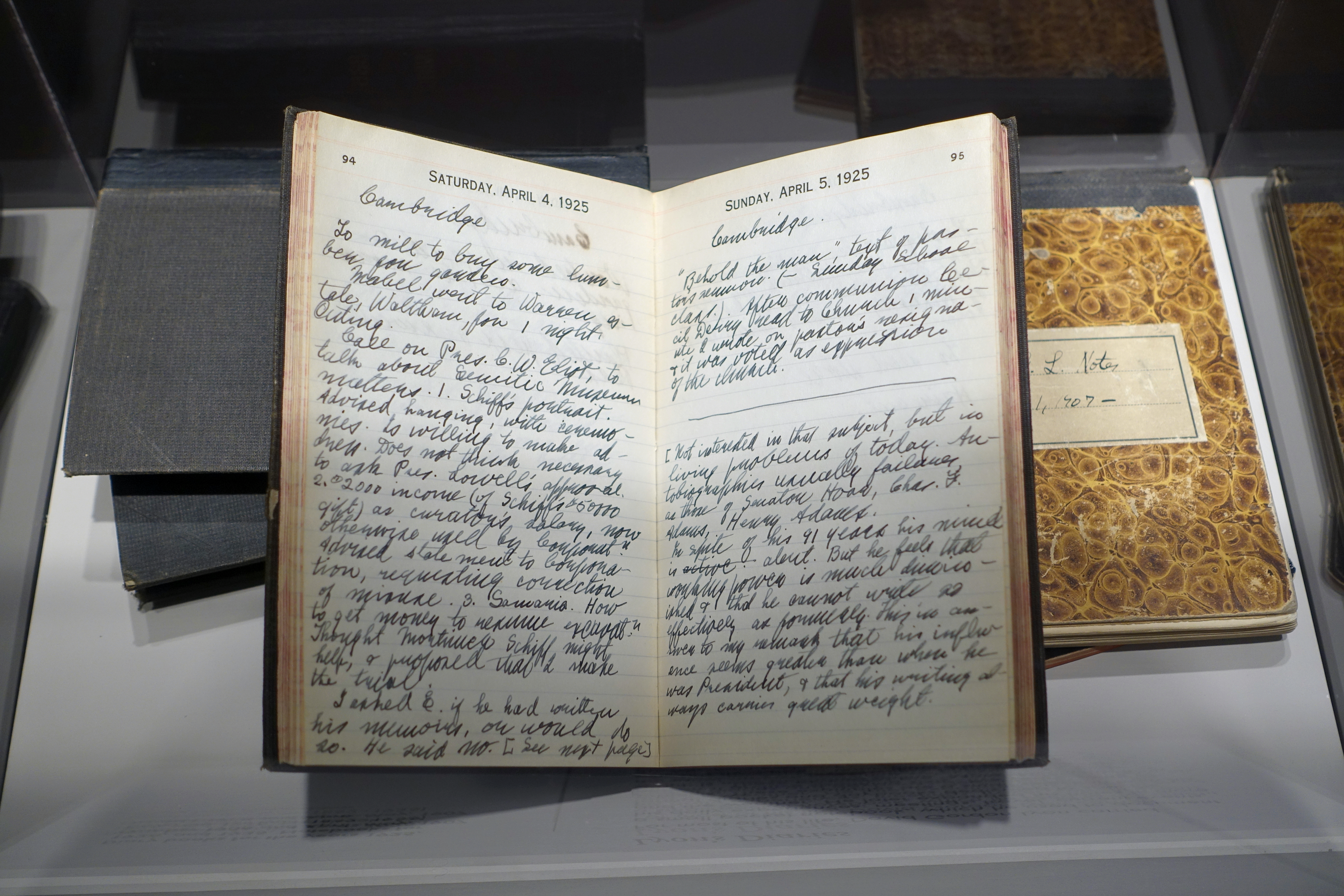
Diaries by David Gordon Lyon, opened to April 4–5, 1925

David Gordon Lyon kept a diary for over 30 years of his life. In 2014, the Semitic Museum began a project entitled "Harvard and the Ancient Near East: The David Gordon Lyon Diaries", to digitize and transcribe the volumes into a human and machine-readable form.
