= Benton, Alabama =

- Town
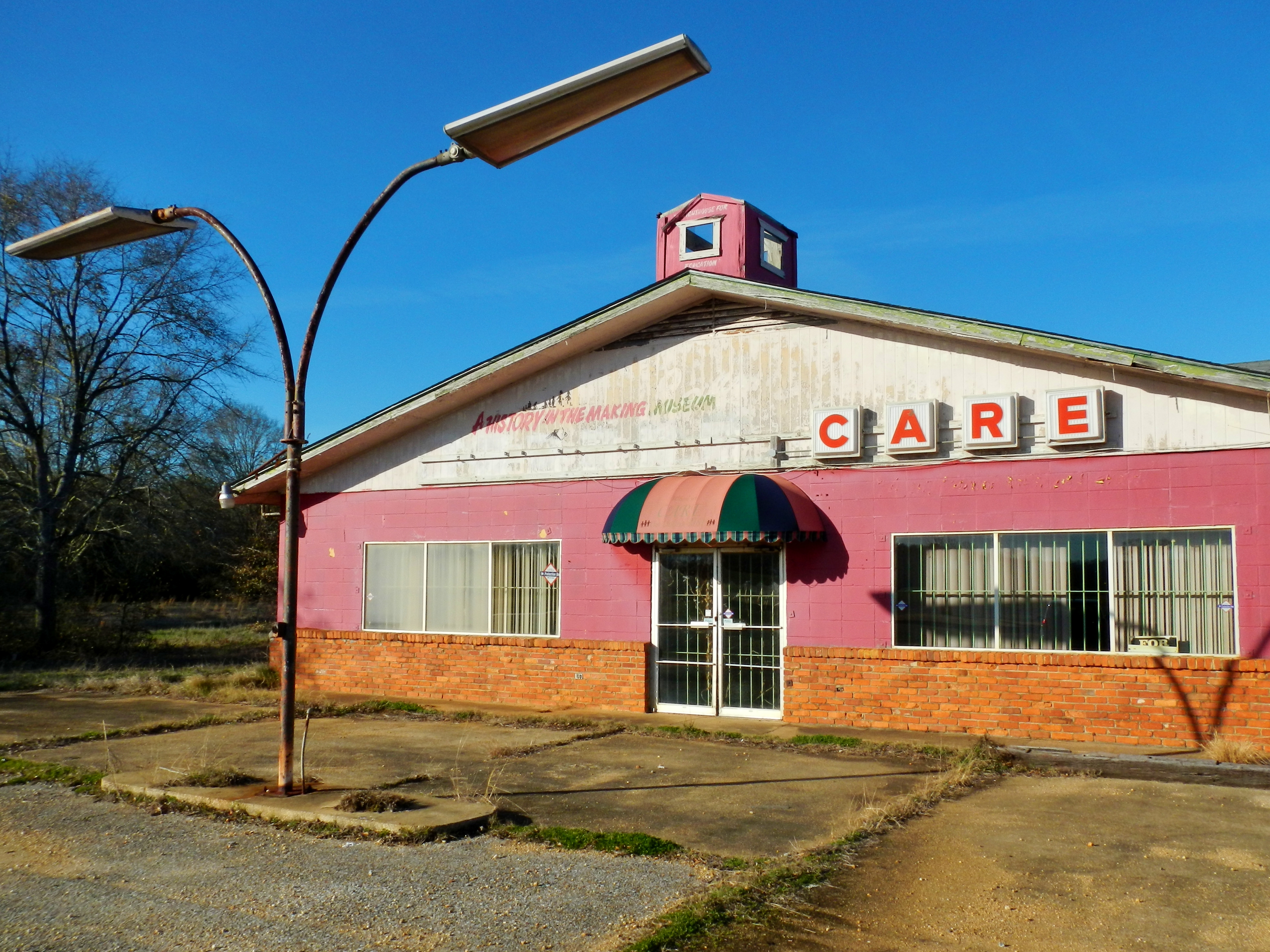

- Location of Benton in Lowndes County, Alabama.
- Coordinates: 32°18′28″N 86°49′05″W
- Country: United States
- State: Alabama
- County: Lowndes

Government
  - Type: Mayor-Council
  - Mayor: Donny Cooper

Area
  - Total: 0.34 sq mi (0.87 km^{2})
  - Land: 0.30 sq mi (0.78 km^{2})
  - Water: 0.035 sq mi (0.09 km^{2})
- Elevation: 131 ft (40 m)

Population (2020)
  - Total: 41
  - Density: 135.8/sq mi (52.43/km^{2})
- Time zone: UTC-6 (Central (CST))
  - Summer (DST): UTC-5 (CDT)
- ZIP code: 36785
- Area code: 334
- FIPS code: 01-05692
- GNIS feature ID: 2405243

Benton is a town in Lowndes County, Alabama, United States. Its population was 41 at the 2020 census, down from 49 at the 2010 census.

== Geography ==
According to the U.S. Census Bureau, the town has a total area of 0.3 square miles (0.78 km^{2}), of which 0.3 square miles (0.78 km^{2}) is land and 0.04 square miles (0.10 km^{2}) (8.82%) is water.

== History ==
Settled in 1832 on land owned by James Maull, it was initially known as Maull's Landing, before it was renamed and incorporated as Benton in 1834. It was named after Thomas Hart Benton, then the U.S. Senator from Missouri, who had served under General Andrew Jackson in the Creek Campaign. During the steamboat era, it was a major trading stop along the Alabama River.

Maull's son, Edward, auctioned off lots in 1855, that were incorporated into the town. The earliest year any population figures were returned by the U.S. Census for the area (below the county level) was in 1870, when Benton Beat (then one of ten divisions in Lowndes County) returned 2,627 residents, the majority of whom were newly emancipated blacks.

In 1880, Lowndes County was subdivided further into 20 beats (precincts), and the Benton Beat fell to 1,094 residents. In 1890, it declined to 994, and for the first time, the town of Benton was reported separately with a population of 265.

Benton's incorporation would lapse shortly (the town did not report a separate population in 1900) and with the shift to railroads, followed by the outmigration of the majority black population, it would dwindle in size. The Benton Precinct would fall from 1,049 in 1900 (same as its 1880 population), down to 409 by 1950, before all the county precincts were eliminated and redistricted into census divisions.

In 1964, Benton was reincorporated, reporting 115 residents as of the 1970 census. As of 1990, it has declined to just under 50 residents and has held steady as of 2010. Out of Lowndes County's seven incorporated communities, it is one of only two with a white majority (as of 2000 and 2010), Lowndesboro being the other. It is also one of the smallest incorporated communities in the state.

Benton, Alabama can be confused in genealogy research with Calhoun County, Alabama, which was known as Benton County from 1832 to 1858, and which was also originally named for Senator Benton, but renamed because of his unpopular (in Alabama) political views — namely, opposition to slavery — by the late 1850s.

== Demographics ==
Historical population
Census	Pop.	Note	%±
1890	265		—
1970	115		—
1980	74		−35.7%
1990	48		−35.1%
2000	47		−2.1%
2010	49		4.3%
2020	41		−16.3%
U.S. Decennial Census

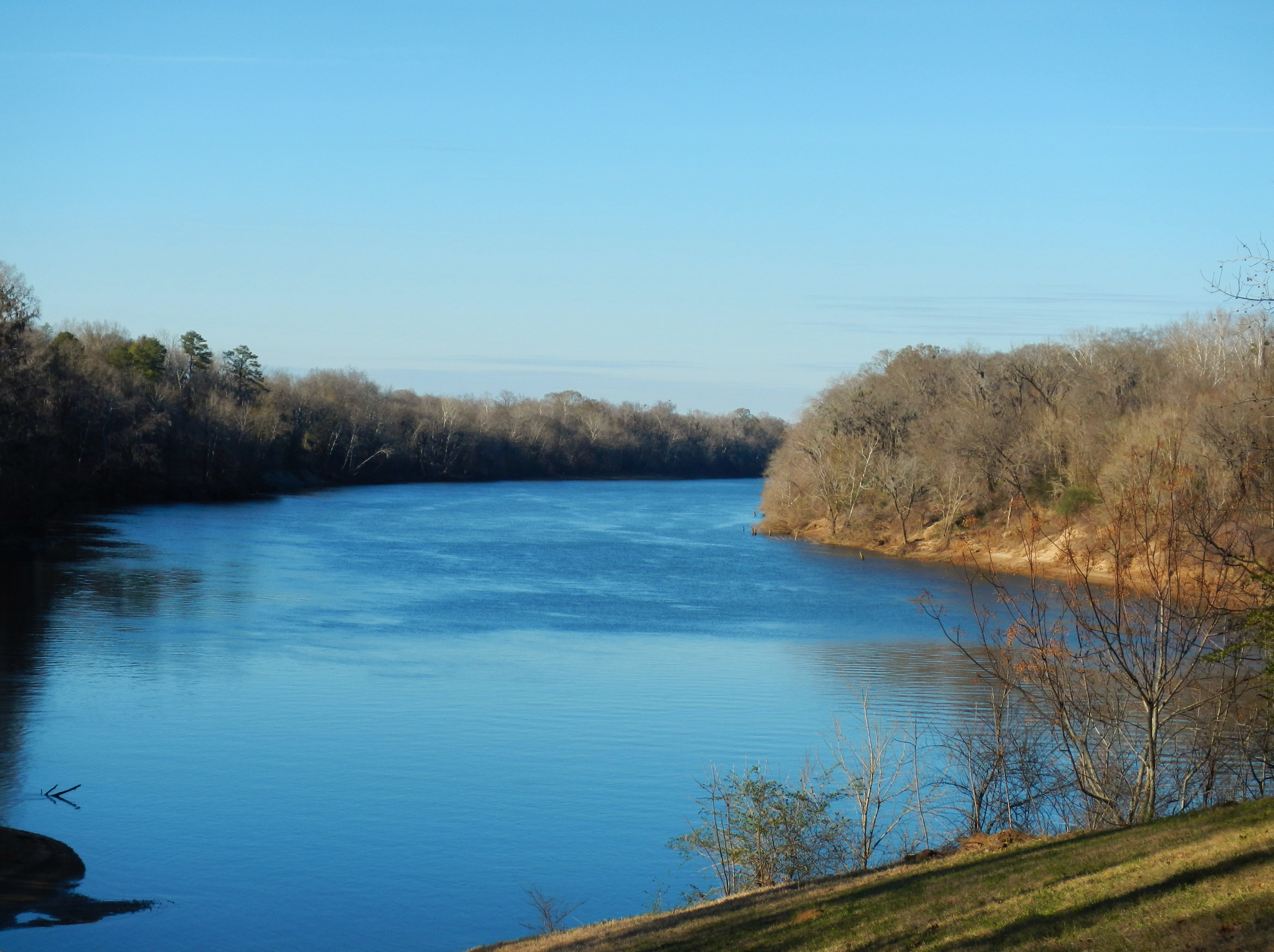
The Alabama River as seen from Benton Park in Benton

As of the census of 2000, there were 47 people, 18 households, and 14 families residing in the town. The population density was 153.4 inhabitants per square mile (59.2/km^{2}). There were 19 housing units at an average density of 62.0 per square mile (23.9/km^{2}). The racial makeup of the town was 76.60% White and 23.40% Black or African American.

There were 18 households, out of which 38.9% had children under the age of 18 living with them, 72.2% were married couples living together, 5.6% had a female householder with no husband present, and 16.7% were non-families. 16.7% of all households were made up of individuals, and none had someone living alone who was 65 years of age or older. The average household size was 2.61 and the average family size was 2.87.

In the town, the population was spread out, with 29.8% under the age of 18, 34.0% from 25 to 44, 19.1% from 45 to 64, and 17.0% who were 65 years of age or older. The median age was 41 years. For every 100 females, there were 123.8 males. For every 100 females age 18 and over, there were 135.7 males.

The median income for a household in the town was $90,000, and the median income for a family was $92,113. Males had a median income of $41,250 versus $26,875 for females. The per capita income for the town was $28,035. There were 7.7% of families and 7.5% of the population living below the poverty line, including 14.3% of under eighteens and none of those over 64.

== Notable people ==
- David Gordon Lyon, Hollis Chair at Harvard Divinity School and founding curator of Semitic Museum
- Bill Traylor, African American self-taught artist
- Zeke Wilson, former Major League Baseball pitcher
