= George Rapall Noyes =

George Rapall Noyes may refer to:

- George R. Noyes (1798–1868), American theologian
- George Rapall Noyes (Slavic scholar) (1873–1952), professor at Berkeley, University of California
