= The Bible's Buried Secrets =

2008 American television program

- Created by: Providence Pictures
- Narrated by: Liev Schreiber
- Country of origin: United States

Production
- Running time: 112 minutes

Original release
- Network: PBS
- Release: November 18, 2008

"The Bible's Buried Secrets" is a Nova program that first aired on PBS, on November 18, 2008. According to the program's official website: "The film presents the latest archaeological scholarship from the Holy Land to explore the beginnings of modern religion and the origins of the Hebrew Bible, also known as the Old Testament. This archaeological detective story tackles some of the biggest questions in biblical studies: Where did the ancient Israelites come from? Who wrote the Bible, when, and why? How did the worship of one God—the foundation of modern Judaism, Christianity, and Islam—emerge?"

== Contents ==
The producers surveyed the evidence and take positions that are mainstream among archaeologists and historians, although they continue to raise objections among both Christians who believe in the bible as either literal or historical truth and minimalists who assert that the Bible has no historical validation.

The program airs archaeologists' assertions that:

On the Origins of Israel

- Modern archaeology, anthropology, biology, geoscience, chemistry, physics, and astronomy have debunked a literal interpretation of both the Genesis creation narrative and the Genesis flood narrative. Archaeology and historical linguistics have debunked the Tower of Babel narrative as well;
- There is no historical evidence for the existence of Abraham, Sarah, Isaac, Jacob, Esau, Joseph, or Moses and other characters of the Book of Genesis and the Book of Exodus;
- There is also no archaeological evidence to corroborate the stories of the destruction of Sodom and Gomorrah, and the mass exodus of the Israelites from Egypt reported in the Book of Exodus. Although scholars believe that a small group did escape from Egypt; however, they were not Israelites but, rather, Canaanite slaves. On their journey back to Canaan they passed through Midian, where they may have been inspired by stories of the Shasu's god, Yhw;
- The Land of Canaan (called the Promised Land in the Hebrew Bible) was not taken over by conquest as described in the Book of Joshua – rather, the Israelites actually might have been Canaanites who migrated into the highlands and created a new identity for themselves. Of the 31 sites the Bible says that Joshua conquered, few showed any signs of war. "Joshua really didn't fight the Battle of Jericho," William G. Dever said.
- The events of the Israelite kingdom given in the Books of Samuel, the Books of Kings and the Books of Chronicles are more or less accurate as history.

On the development of the Hebrew Bible or Tanakh

- The Bible's first books have been traced back to multiple authors writing over a span of centuries. (See Documentary hypothesis and Supplementary hypothesis.)
- The early books of the Bible, Genesis, Exodus, Leviticus, Numbers, Deuteronomy, Joshua, Samuel, and Kings, reached almost their present form during the Babylonian exile of the 6th century BCE.

On the development of monotheism in Israel

- The Israelite religion was not exclusively monotheistic from the beginning as suggested in the Hebrew Bible, rather, the archaeological evidence indicates that, before the Babylonian exile in the 6th century BCE, the early Israelites were polytheistic (or, rather, henotheistic) and worshiped the local god Yahweh alongside his "wife," a fertility goddess named Asherah.
- The emergence of monotheism and the belief in the universality of Yahweh was a response to the tragic experience of the Babylonian exile of the Israelites in the 6th century BCE. According to Dever, "It's out of this that comes the reflection that polytheism was our [the Israelites'] downfall."

== Featured archaeologists and historians ==
- Gabriel Barkay, Amnon Ben-Tor, Manfred Bietak, Elisabetta Boaretto, Joan Branham, Thomas Cahill, Shaye Cohen, Michael Coogan, William G. Dever, Hani Nur El-Din, Avraham Faust, Israel Finkelstein, David Ilan, Lee Levine, Peter Machinist, Jodi Magness, Amihai Mazar, Eilat Mazar, Kyle McCarter, Carol Meyers, Eric Meyers, Donald Redford, Lawrence Stager, Ephraim Stern, Ron Tappy, Andrew Vaughn, Sharon Zuckerman

== Reviews and reception ==
The Biblical Archaeology Review wrote: "The producers have done a magnificent job summarizing over a century of biblical archaeology and biblical scholarship in two hours. The film strikes a balance between the old-fashioned biblical archaeology approach, which tried to prove the Bible's historicity, and the extreme skepticism of some minimalists, for whom the Bible contains little factual history."

According to Rabbi Wesley Gardenswartz: "Conservative Judaism is fully accepting of the type of scholarship featured in this documentary."

Catholic theologian Kenneth R. Himes says: "For some, the ideas presented may seem novel or surprising, but this is material that is being discussed in the theology courses found at many Catholic universities."

The conservative American Family Association has issued an online petition urging the United States Congress to cut off federal funding for PBS. "PBS is knowingly choosing to insult and attack Christianity by airing a program that declares the Bible 'isn't true and a bunch of stories that never happened,'" signers of the petition are encouraged to declare to members of Congress.

Apologetics Press, a publishing organization affiliated with the Churches of Christ, has written a response to this program that is summarized with the concluding paragraph: "... if Christians are to change their minds about the historicity of the events recorded in the Hebrew Bible, a better case, supported by adequate evidence, would have to be made than the one presented in The Bible's Buried Secrets."

The inerrantist Bible and Spade magazine dismissed the program as "anti-Bible propaganda".

== See also ==
- Biblical archaeology
- Biblical criticism
- The Bible and history
- Biblical archaeology school
- Judgment Day: Intelligent Design on Trial
- Religions of the ancient Near East
- Ancient Semitic religion
- Canaanite religion
- Assyro-Babylonian religion
- Origins of Judaism
- Merneptah Stele
- Tel Hazor (Hatzor)
- Yahu
