= Islam at Harvard University =

Islamic studies and Muslim environment at Harvard University

Religious affiliation among the Harvard class of 2024
1. Agnosticism (23.9%)
2. Atheism (17.4%)
3. Catholicism (16.9%)
4. Hinduism (3.10%)
5. Islam (3.90%)
6. Judaism (7.40%)
7. Mormonism (0.50%)
8. Protestantism (14.5%)
9. Other (11.3%)

There is a small but notable community of Muslims at Harvard University, compromising 3.9% of the class of 2024. The proportion of Muslims within the university has increased over time, from 1.3% in the class of 2016, 2.6% in the class of 2017, and 3.9% in the class of 2024. (Note: These statistics are from surveys, not censuses.)

== University resources ==
Starting in 1654, the university originally provided Arabic language classes before introducing actual Islamic classes. Such classes were taught alongside Hebrew and other Semitic languages as a part of Biblical studies. According to early Arabic professor Stephen Sewall, it was a "pity, not to say disgrace" that Harvard supposedly lagged behind European universities in Arabic studies by 1768.

In 1765, the first Islamic books were brought to the Harvard Library, and the first Islamic course was taught in 1889. In the same year, the Harvard Museum of the Ancient Near East (Note: Then called the "Harvard Semitic Museum" until it was renamed in 2020.) was founded and provided manuscripts and artifacts brought from the Ottoman Empire. In 1948, the first Iranian languages were taught, and in 1954, the Center for Middle Eastern Studies was built, which includes Islamic studies, academia, government, business, journalism, and law. Additionally, in 1998, the Middle East Initiative was founded at the Harvard Kennedy School in order to interact with and study the affairs of Muslim-majority nations.

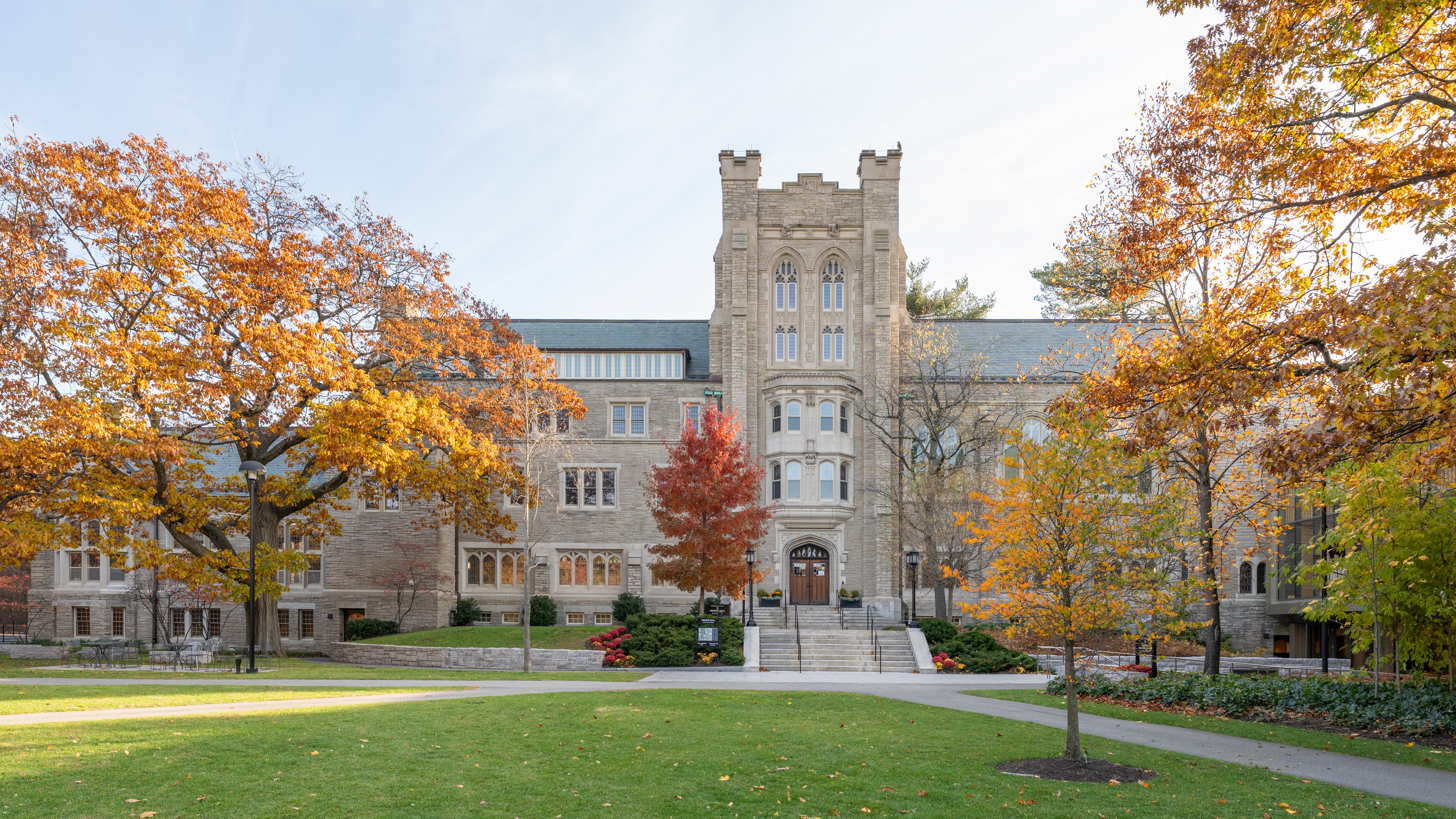
Harvard Divinity School offers Islamic courses

Islamic courses include Islamic art (Note: the university collected Islamic art starting in 1919.) (Note: The first classes regarding Islamic art started in 1969.), architecture (Note: The first classes regarding Islamic architecture started in 1969.), calligraphy, literature, history (Note: The first classes regarding Islamic history started in 1986 by Roy Mottahedeh.), philosophy, theology, culture, economics, law (Note: The first classes regarding Islamic law started in 1947 at Harvard Law School by professor Arthur Taylor von Mehren.) (Note: The first program regarding Islamic law started in 2018 at Harvard Law School by professor Intisar A. Rabb.), science (Note: The first classes regarding Islam and science started in 1973.), sects, and modernism. Additional courses cover Islam and Christianity, politics, women (Note: The first classes regarding women in Islam started in 1999 at Harvard Divinity School by Leila Ahmed.), Islam in India (Note: The first classes regarding Indo-Muslim culture started in 1967 by Annemarie Schimmel.), Iran, Spain, South Asia, Syria, Islamic empires, comparative religion, and Orientalism.

== Students ==
The Harvard Islamic Society represents Muslim students at the university. It provides meetings, prayers, programs, service opportunities, and Islamic resources.

== Notable alumni ==
- Ali S. Asani
- Celene Ibrahim
- Daniel Haqiqatjou
- Mafaz Al-Suwaidan
- Muzammil H. Siddiqi
- Roy Mottahedeh
- Tarek Masoud

== See also ==
- Islam in the United States
