= Buried Secrets =

Buried Secrets may refer to:

- Buried Secrets (EP), by Painkiller, 1992
- Buried Secrets (film), a 1996 horror TV film
- Sarah Jane Smith: Buried Secrets (2005), an audio play
- "Buried Secrets" (Body of Proof), a 2011 TV episode
- "Buried Secrets", a 2014 episode of Teenage Mutant Ninja Turtles (2012 TV series) season 3)

== See also ==
- Stolen Voices, Buried Secrets, a 2011–2012 true-crime TV documentary series
- The Bible's Buried Secrets, a 2008 American TV program
