= Hotel Workers Rising =

Campaign for better hotel worker rights

- Website: www.hotelworkersrising.org

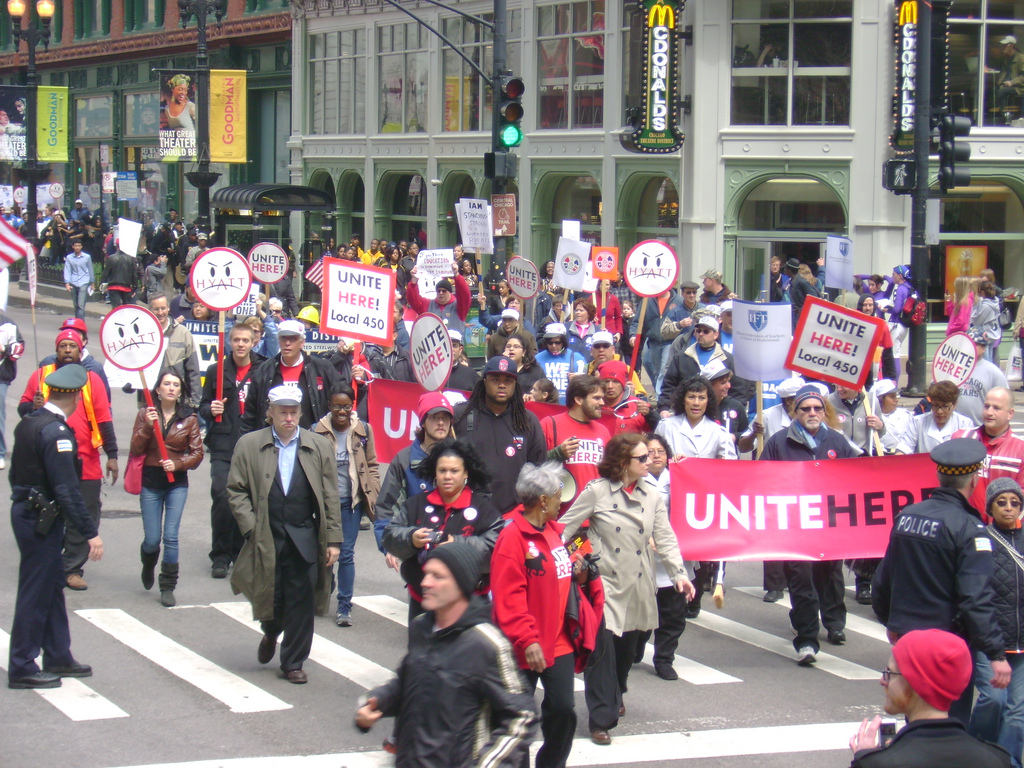
"We Are One" march in Chicago, IL; 9 April 2009

Hotel Workers Rising is long-term organizing campaign, created by UNITE HERE in 2006, aimed at organizing and mobilizing hotel workers to win improvements in the workplace. Demands include higher wages, better benefits, safer workloads, and the right to unionize freely.

== Issues ==
Workers in the hotel industry are mainly women of color and immigrant women. Often, these women describe feeling "invisible"—expected to clean relentlessly without presenting a human face to hotel guests. According to the workers, this status is connected to extremely poor working conditions and unreasonable expectations.

=== Right to unionize ===
Many hotel workers are non-union, and the campaign has accused many hotels and hotel companies of intimidation and union busting.

=== Allies ===
The Hotel Workers Rising campaign has garnered the support of individuals and community organizations outside of the labor movement. John Edwards and Danny Glover have both appeared at various events endorsing the goals of the campaign. For its recent Hyatt Hurts campaign, Hotel Workers Rising has formed alliances with many different groups, including the National Organization for Women, MoveOn.org, and the NFL Players Association.

UNITE HERE has allied with LGBT rights activists creating the "Sleep With the Right People" slogan and collaborating on projects of mutual interest. The groups orchestrated a successful joint campaign (which involved a "Kiss-In", as well as a boycott) against the San Diego Grand Hyatt, whose owner Doug Manchester was a major supporter of California Proposition 8. (GOProud, a conservative gay organization, criticized the "gay left" for its "slavish loyalty to big labor".)

== Employers ==
=== HEI ===
Hotel Workers Rising has intensified its focus on HEI Hotels & Resorts, a major hotel manager. Pressure in 2012 caused a number of universities—including Harvard, Yale, Princeton, and Brown—to divest from the company.

Workers have been protesting at an Embassy Suites hotel in Irvine, CA, owned by MassMutual, which has not allowed them unionize. In September 2012, the hotel's administrators (Cornerstone Real Estate Advisers) replaced HEI with Hostmark as the management company; workers went on strike to protest the bad conditions which, in their view, remained in place regardless of the company in charge.
