= Lawrence Stager =

American archaeologist (1943–2017)

- Born: January 5, 1943; Dunkirk, Ohio, US
- Died: December 29, 2017 (aged 74); Concord, Massachusetts, US
- Title: Dorot Professor of the Archaeology of Israel

Academic background
- Education: BA (1965), MA (1972), PhD (1975)
- Alma mater: University of Chicago; Harvard University

Academic work
- Discipline: Archaeology
- Sub-discipline: Syro-Palestinian archaeology Hebrew Bible
- Institutions: Harvard University

Lawrence E. "Larry" Stager (January 5, 1943 – December 29, 2017) was an American archaeologist and academic, specialising in Syro-Palestinian archaeology and Biblical archaeology. He was the Dorot Professor of the Archaeology of Israel in the Department of Near Eastern Languages and Civilizations at Harvard University and was Director of the Harvard Semitic Museum. Beginning in 1985 he oversaw the excavations of the Leon Levy Expedition to Ashkelon, the Philistine port city.

== Education ==
Stager was a first-generation college student from Kenton, Ohio, about fifty miles northwest of Columbus, Ohio. He was recruited by the Harvard Club of Dayton, Ohio to attend Harvard University, where he graduated a BA magna cum laude in 1965. Stager then received both his MA and PhD from Harvard, where he worked largely under the supervision of Frank Moore Cross and G. Ernest Wright, both students of William F. Albright. The title of his thesis was Ancient Agriculture in the Judaean Desert: A Case Study of the Buqê'ah Valley in the Iron Age.

== Academic positions ==
After receiving his PhD, Stager was first employed by the University of Chicago, where he taught and researched for the next fourteen years as a member of the Oriental Institute, first as an instructor (1973-4), then as an assistant (1974-6), associate (1976–1985), and finally full professor (1985-6).

In 1986, Stager returned to Harvard, where he became the inaugural holder of an endowed chair, the Dorot Professorship of the Archaeology of Israel. Stager taught courses in Syro-Palestinian archaeology and Hebrew Bible and was an active professional member of the American Schools of Oriental Research (ASOR).

In 2009, a Festschrift for Stager was published under the title Exploring the Longue Durée: Essays in Honor of Lawrence E. Stager (Ed. J. David Schloen; Winona Lake, Ind.: Eisenbrauns).

== Archaeological work ==
Stager's most important archaeological work was conducted through the Leon Levy Expedition to Ascalon, of which he became the director in 1985. This expedition is one of the largest and lengthiest projects in Israel. The results of the dig have been published in the Harvard Semitic Museum and Eisenbrauns' Ashkelon, a series of ten volumes, the third of which was published in 2011.

Prior to his monumental undertakings at Ashkelon, Stager worked on digs at Carthage, Idalion, Gezer, and Tell el-Hesi.

Stager generally adhered to the traditional scholarly dating of the "United Monarchy" of King David and Solomon.
