= Crawford Howell Toy =

American biblical and Hebrew scholar (1836–1919)

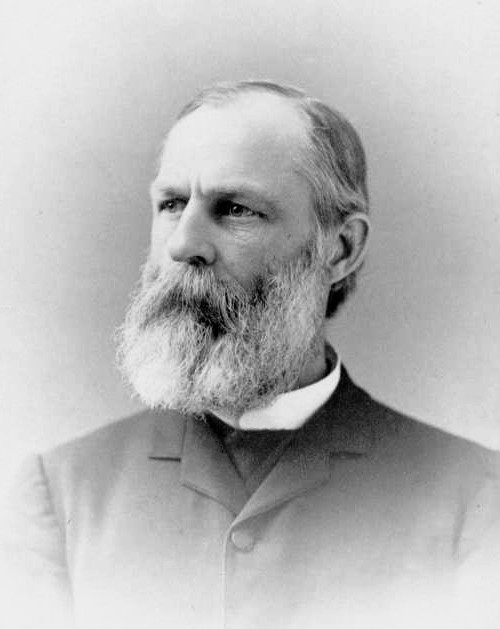
- Born: March 23, 1836; Norfolk, Virginia, U.S.
- Died: May 12, 1919 (aged 83); Cambridge, Massachusetts, U.S.
- Education: University of Virginia (1856); University of Berlin (1868)
- Known for: Hebrew scholar

Crawford Howell Toy (March 23, 1836 – May 12, 1919), American Hebrew scholar, was born in Norfolk, Virginia. He graduated at the University of Virginia in 1856, and studied at the University of Berlin from 1866 to 1868. From 1869 to 1879 he was professor of Hebrew in the Southern Baptist Theological Seminary (first in Greenville, South Carolina, and after 1877 in Louisville, Kentucky), and in 1880 he became Hancock Professor of Hebrew and Oriental languages at Harvard University, where until 1903 he was also Dexter lecturer on biblical literature.

== Controversy ==
While Professor Toy was a professor at The Southern Baptist Theological Seminary in Louisville, Kentucky, he was embroiled in one of the earliest theological controversies of the Southern Baptist Convention, which was founded in 1845. Influenced by European higher criticism of the Bible and advances in science, Toy began intellectual pursuits that would ultimately cost him his tenure at Southern. Toy began to see Darwin's theories as truth revealed by God "in the form proper to his time." Shaped by the historical-critical method of studying scripture that had been popularized in Europe by Julius Wellhausen, Toy came to believe that the writers of the New Testament—using a rabbinical hermeneutic of their day—misunderstood the original meaning of several Old Testament passages (e.g., Psalm 16:10, Isaiah 53) when they placed a Christological emphasis on them.

The founding president of Southern, Dr. James P. Boyce, asked Toy to refrain from teaching contrary to the school's Abstract of Principles on the doctrine of biblical inspiration. Toy, however, insisted on answering questions by students pertinent to his modernist understanding of the Old Testament. It was an April 1879 article in The Sunday School Times on his views of Isaiah 53:1–12 that would lead to his resignation in May of the same year.

Soon after Toy went to be the professor of Hebrew and Semitic languages at Harvard, he broke his ties with Southern Baptists and became a practicing Unitarian. The effects of Toy's dismissal continued to rumble through Southern Baptist life. Two young missionaries appointed by the Foreign Mission Board (SBC) were ultimately dismissed because of holding views similar to those of Professor Toy.

== Relationship with Lottie Moon ==
In addition to his controversy at Southern Seminary, Toy is also famous for teaching and once being engaged to Lottie Moon, for whom the SBC annual Christmas offering for international missions is named. Toy first encountered Lottie Moon at the Albemarle Female Institute, founded by Southern Seminary founder John Broadus. Lottie was a capable student in languages, becoming one of the first women in the south to earn a master's degree in the field. Lottie—who previously learned Latin, Greek, French, Italian, and Spanish—would learn Hebrew and English grammar under Toy's tutelage. Toy wrote of Moon, "She writes the best English I have ever been privileged to read."

Lottie Moon went on to become a missionary in Tengchow, China. In her 1881 correspondence with Southern Baptist Foreign Mission Board secretary H. A. Tupper, Moon expressed her plans to marry Toy, who was now a professor at Harvard. Ultimately, Toy and Moon's relationship was broken before their marriage plans were realized. Moon cited religious reasons for calling off the wedding—his controversial new beliefs regarding the Bible and her commitment to remain in China doing mission work for Southern Baptists.

== Writings ==
- The History of the Religion of Israel: An Old Testament Primer. Boston: American Unitarian Association, 1882.
- Quotations in the New Testament. Charles Scribner's Sons, 1884.
- Judaism and Christianity: A Sketch of the Progress of Thought from Old Testament to New Testament. Boston: Little, Brown, 1891.
- Esther as Babylonian Goddess. Boston: Houghton Mifflin, 1898.
- A Critical and Exegetical Commentary on the Book of Proverbs. New York: Scribner's, 1899.
- The Book of the Prophet Ezekiel. New York: Dodd, 1899.
- Introduction to the History of Religions. Boston: Ginn, 1913.

== Relevant reading ==
- Parsons, Mikeal C. 2019. Crawford Howell Toy. Macon, GA: Mercer University Press.
