= Paul D. Hanson =

American biblical scholar (1939–2023)

Paul David Hanson (November 17, 1939 – June 9, 2023) was an American biblical scholar who taught for 40 years at Harvard Divinity School in Cambridge, Massachusetts.

Hanson spent his whole career at Harvard Divinity School, starting out in 1971 as an Assistant Professor of Old Testament. He was appointed the Florence Corliss Lamont Professor of Divinity (1988–2009) and Bussey Professor of Divinity (1981–1988). Upon his retirement from the active faculty in 2009, he became the Florence Corliss Lamont Research Professor of Divinity.

== Education ==
Hanson received a Bachelor of Arts from Gustavus Adolphus College in 1961 after which he received a Fulbright to study at the University of Heidelberg. In 1965 he received a Bachelor of Divinity from Yale University and in 1970 he completed a Ph.D. at Harvard's Department of Near Eastern Languages and Civilizations.

== Career ==
After receiving his doctoral degree, he spent a year doing archaeological research in Israel; he subsequently spent sabbatical years in Israel and Germany and most recently at Princeton University. In his courses he focused on Hebrew prophecy, Jewish literature of the Second Temple Period, the religion of the ancient cultures of Mesopotamia and Egypt, and biblical theology. Hanson's work on the apocalyptic theorized a separation in Second Temple Judaism between a pragmatic, priestly, temple-establishment group that attempted to use its dominance of the temple cult to avoid any conflicts with various distant governments; and a pietistic, visionary group cut off from political power that sought the return of an idealized Judaism, and wrote apocalyptic and eschatological tracts predicting and advocating for the return of this pure Judaism. The books of Ezra, Nehemiah, and Chronicles are seen as examples of the first group, while parts of Isaiah, Joel, and Zechariah as examples of the second group. Later scholarship has generally been skeptical of this, seeing Second Temple Judaism in general as influenced by cosmic and "mantic" prophecies, not just countryside pietists.

Hanson was a member of the Old Testament editorial board for the commentary series Hermeneia: A Critical and Historical Commentary on the Bible (published by Fortress Press). As a member of that board, Hanson acted as the volume editor of the following commentaries: Hosea (by Hans Walter Wolff, 1974), Ezekiel 2 (by Walther Zimmerli, 1983), Micah (by Delbert Hillers, 1984), Jeremiah 1 & 2 (by William L. Holladay, 1986, 1989), and Zephaniah (by Marvin A. Sweeney, 2003).

His book A Political History of the Bible, which examines the interplay between religion and politics with an emphasis on American faith communities rooted in Biblical tradition, was published in 2015.

Hanson was a member of University Lutheran Church (Cambridge, MA) and a member of the Council for Lutheran Theological Education in the Northeast.

== Death ==
Paul D. Hanson died on June 9, 2023, at the age of 83.

== Select bibliography ==
Hanson was considered an expert on Biblical hermeneutics and wrote numerous books on theological interpretations. His titles include:

- The Dawn of Apocalyptic: The Historical and Sociological Roots of Jewish Apocalyptic Eschatology (1975; rev. ed. 1979), ISBN 9780800618094
- Dynamic Transcendence: The Correlation of Confessional Heritage and Contemporary Experience in a Biblical Model of Divine Activity (1978)
- The Diversity of Scripture: A Theological Interpretation (1982)
- (editor) Visionaries and Their Apocalypses (1983)
- The People Called: The Growth of Community in the Bible (1986; 2d ed. 2001) ISBN 9780664224455
- Old Testament Apocalyptic (1987)
- Isaiah 40-66: Interpretation: A Bible Commentary for Teaching and Preaching (1995), ISBN 9780664238759
- Political Engagement as Biblical Mandate (2010), ISBN 9781498210898
- A Political History of the Bible in America (2015), ISBN 9780664260392
