= George R. Noyes =

Unitarian minister and scholar

George Rapall Noyes (March 6, 1798 – June 3, 1868) was a Unitarian minister and scholar at Harvard University.

== Biography ==
Noyes was born in Newburyport and graduated from Harvard in 1818, studied divinity there, was licensed to preach in 1822, served as tutor in 1823–27, and in 1827 was ordained pastor of the First Unitarian Society of Petersham, Massachusetts. He received the degree of D.D. from Harvard in 1839. From October 1840 until his death, he was Hancock Professor of Hebrew and Dexter Lecturer on Biblical Literature in the Theological Department of Harvard College. He was an eminent Greek and Hebrew scholar, and proficient in sacred literature. Noyes died in Cambridge, Massachusetts, a few days after correcting the final page proofs for his New Testament translation.

== Works ==
Noyes devoted many years to the translation of the Old and New Testaments, to which he added copious notes. His works, which are chiefly in the department of Hebrew philology, are:

- An Amended Version of the Book of Job (Cambridge, 1827; 2d ed., Boston, 1838)
- The Psalms (1827)
- The Prophets (1843; 3d ed., 2 vols., 1866)
- Proverbs, Ecclesiastes, and Canticles (1846)
- Theological Essays, Selected from Various Authors (1856)
- New Translation of the New Testament, posthumous (1869)

He was a contributor to the Christian Examiner.

== Family ==
His son Stephen Butterick Noyes was librarian at the Brooklyn Library (now the business library of the Brooklyn Public Library).
