= Harvard University Police Department =

Police agency in Cambridge, Massachusetts, US

Coordinates: 42°22′08.20″N 71°06′43.86″W

Harvard University Police

Agency overview
- Jurisdiction: All property owned or used by Harvard University
- Employees: 80+ Sworn Officers
- Agency executive: Chief Victor Clay
- Website: Harvard University Police

The Harvard University Police Department (HUPD) is a private police agency affiliated with Harvard University, a private Ivy League university in Cambridge, Massachusetts. It is a full-service police department responsible for the safety and security of Harvard students, faculty, staff, and visitors at the university's Cambridge and Boston campuses.

Since April 2021, Victor Clay is HUPD's chief of police, who succeeded long-time chief Francis D. “Bud” Riley. The chief performs his duties under the direction of the university's general counsel, Diane Lopez.

== Divisions ==
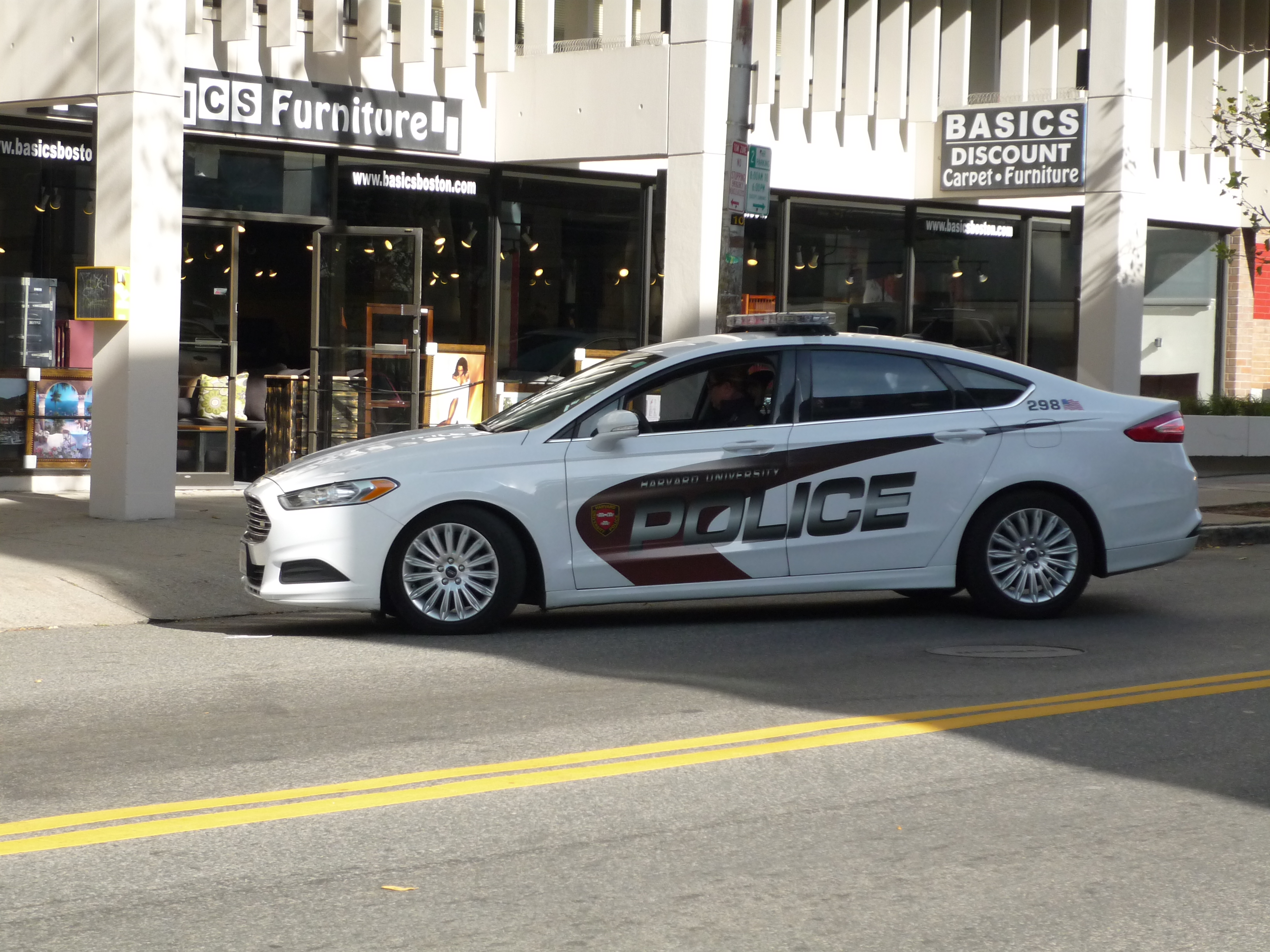
A Harvard University Police cruise car in October 2014

- Criminal Investigation Division
- Dignitary Protection Unit
- Patrol Division

== Authority ==
All sworn members of the Harvard University Police Department are sworn as special state police officers under Massachusetts General Laws Chapter 22C Section 63. This gives them full powers of arrest in and upon all property owned or controlled by Harvard University. Additionally, all officers hold commissions as deputy sheriffs for Middlesex County and Suffolk County, which gives them powers of arrest throughout Cambridge, Somerville, and Boston, where Harvard has facilities.

== Police logs controversy ==
HUPD has been the target of requests for greater transparency in the records it keeps or publishes about its officers’ actions.

In 2003, The Harvard Crimson, the undergraduate student newspaper, filed suit against HUPD in Massachusetts Superior Court. In January 2006, the case, The Harvard Crimson v. President and Fellows of Harvard College, et al, which was transferred to Massachusetts Supreme Judicial Court, was won by the university.
