= HEI Hotels & Resorts =

Resl estate investment firm

- Industry: Hospitality
- Founded: 1985; 41 years ago
- Headquarters: Norwalk, Connecticut
- Key people: Gary Mendell (founder); Steve Mendell (founder); Clark Hanratt (CEO and managing partner)
- Services: Hotel investment and management

HEI Hotels & Resorts is a hospitality owner and operator based in Norwalk, Connecticut. Founded by brothers Gary and Steve Mendell, HEI owns and manages over 100 limited-service, full-service, upper-upscale, and luxury hotels and resorts throughout the United States under brand names as Marriott, Hilton, Embassy Suites, Westin, Le Méridien, and Sheraton.

== History ==
HEI was founded by brothers Gary and Steve Mendell in 1985 as a hotel investment and management company. By 2012, HEI owned or managed 41 hotels and operated three investment funds totaling more than $1.2 billion. HEI's portfolio reached 103 properties in 2025 following the addition of the Claremont Resort & Club in Berkeley, California.

In June 2025, HEI assumed management of Waymore's Guest House and Social Club.

== Environmental initiatives ==
HEI Hotels & Resorts is involved in environmental initiatives such as investing in new technologies to cut energy use at its properties. In 2011, President Obama selected HEI to participate in "Better Building Challenge". The company has also been a repeat winner of U.S. Environmental Protection Agency's Energy Star Partner of the Year.
