= Stephen Sewall (orientalist) =

Steven Sewell
- Born: March 24, 1734; York, Maine
- Died: July 23, 1804 (aged 70); Boston, Province of Massachusetts

Academic background
- Education: Harvard University

Academic work
- Discipline: Linguistics
- Sub-discipline: Hebrew
- Institutions: Harvard University

Stephen Sewall (March 24, 1734 – July 23, 1804) was an American professor of Hebrew and Oriental languages at Harvard University. He was a charter member of the American Academy of Arts and Sciences (1780) and was considered one of the greatest scholars of his generation.

He replaced Judah Monis as the lecturer in Hebrew at his alma mater shortly after he graduated in 1761.
