= Peter Machinist =

American historian

Peter Machinist is an American historian, currently the Hancock Professor Emeritus of Hebrew and other Oriental Languages at Harvard University.
