= Harvard Museum of the Ancient Near East =

Museum in Cambridge, MA, USA

Coordinates: 42°22′41″N 71°06′50″W

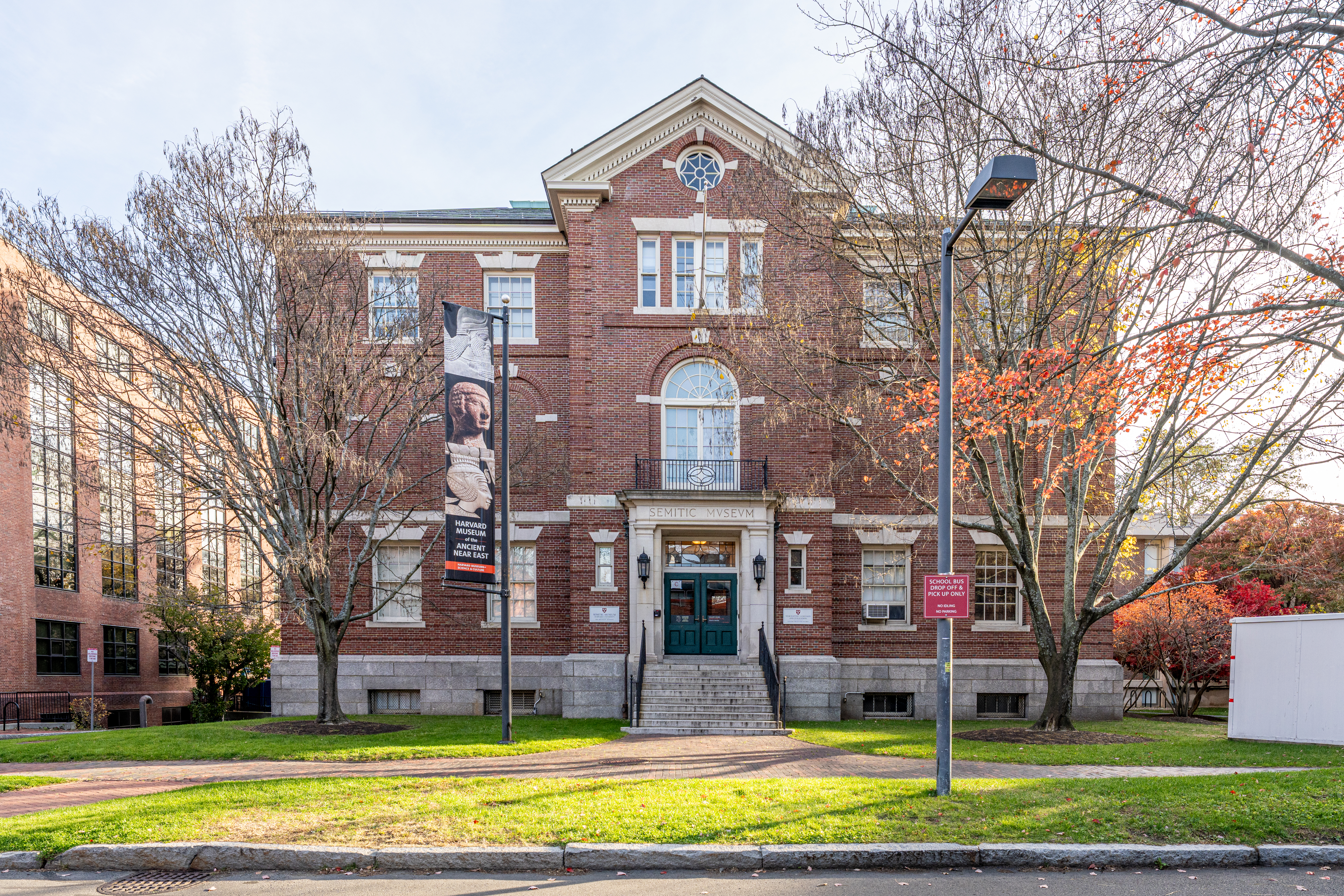
- HMANE occupies its 1903 building on the Harvard campus
- Former name: Harvard Semitic Museum
- Established: 1889
- Location: 6 Divinity Avenue, Cambridge, Massachusetts 02138
- Type: Archeology
- Architect: A. W. Longfellow
- Owner: Harvard University
- Public transit access: Harvard (MBTA)

The Harvard Museum of the Ancient Near East (HMANE, previously the Harvard Semitic Museum) is a museum founded in 1889. It moved into its present location at 6 Divinity Avenue in Cambridge, Massachusetts, in 1903.

== History ==
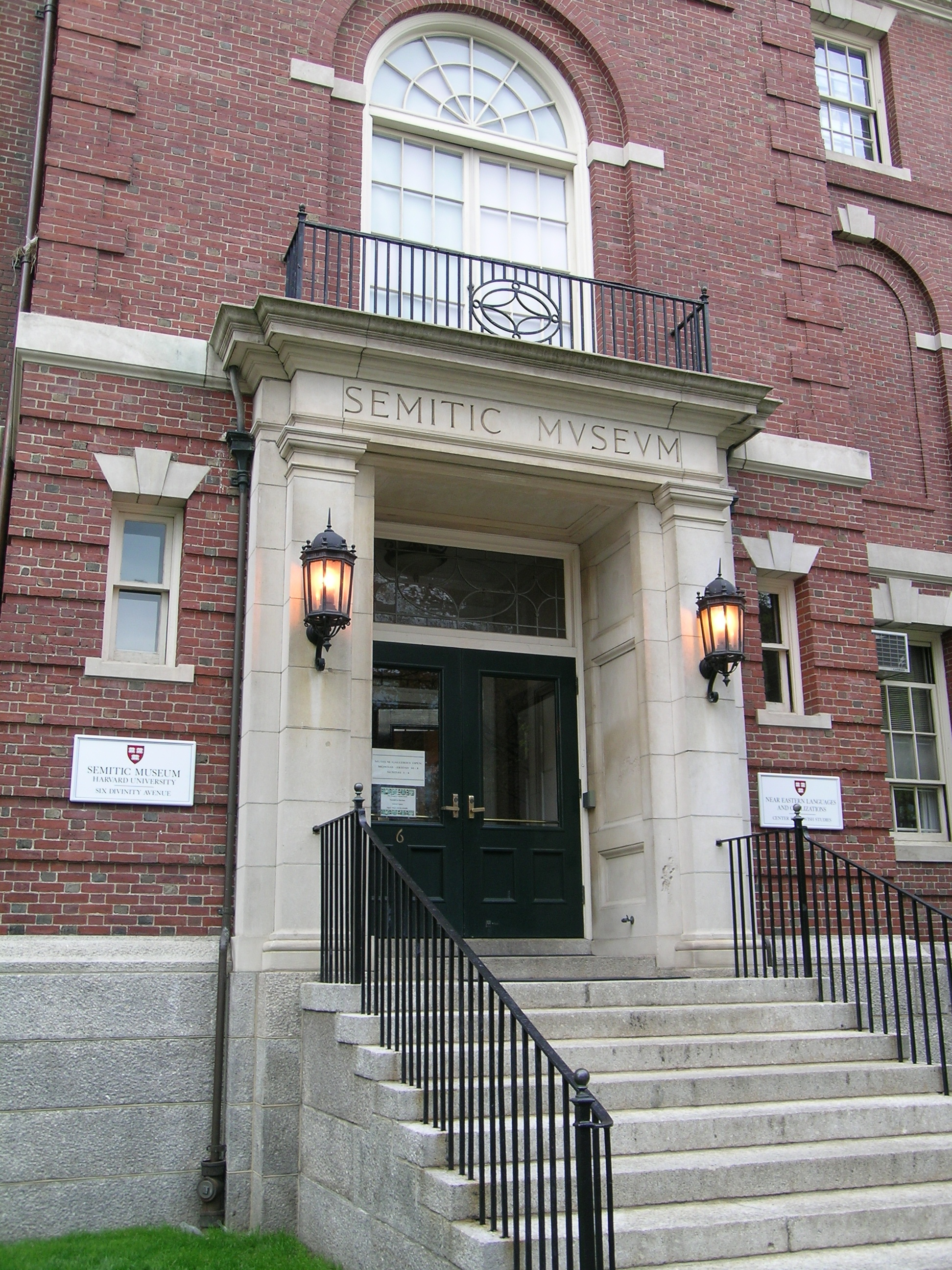
The original name is carved above the entrance

Architectural firm A. W. Longfellow broke ground on the present HMANE site on September 27, 1900. Construction was completed in spring of 1902, and the public portions of the museum were opened on February 5, 1903.

The museum's facilities were repurposed during World War II, and it was closed to the public from August 1942 through April 1946. Twelve years later it was closed again to the public, lasting from 1958 through 1982.

On October 14, 1970, a bomb was detonated on the third floor of the museum amid protests on campus against the Vietnam War. That floor held the Weatherhead Center for International Affairs.

The museum reopened in April 1982, and then Harvard president Derek Bok spoke at the reopening ceremony. In December 2012, Harvard announced a new consortium, the Harvard Museums of Science and Culture, whose members were the Harvard Museum of Natural History, the Harvard Semitic Museum, the Peabody Museum of Archaeology and Ethnology, and the Collection of Historical Scientific Instruments.

In April 2020, Peter Der Manuelian, director of the museum, announced changing its name to the Harvard Museum of the Ancient Near East (HMANE), explaining that "The change is not a reaction to any particular event, but rather our attempt to reflect our core mission in clearer terms." He also announced a "virtual tour" of the museum's galleries, allowing visitors to view many artifacts in detail, even as the physical museum was temporarily closed due to the COVID-19 pandemic.

== See also ==
- Islam at Harvard University
