= History of Harvard Extension School =

Although Harvard Extension School was established in 1910 by A. Lawrence Lowell, its history traces to the founding of the Lowell Institute in 1836, which was created to provide free public lectures to the residents of Greater Boston. From its inception, Harvard Extension School was designed to serve the educational interests and needs of the local community, but has since expanded its educational reach to students locally, nationally, and internationally.

Growing out of the 1907 "Collegiate Courses," a collaboration between Harvard University and the Lowell Institute, Harvard Extension School developed through the creation of the Commission on Extension Courses, a consortium of Boston-area institutions of higher education, and the establishment of Harvard's Department of University Extension in 1910. From the Extension School's earliest years, Harvard faculty taught adult learners the same courses they taught under Harvard's regular curriculum, with the same standards of study and examination. Over time, the school's degree offerings evolved, culminating in the establishment of the Bachelor of Liberal Arts (A.L.B.) and the Master of Liberal Arts (A.L.M.) designations in 1979.

Harvard Extension School has been a leader in distance education for over 100 years, offering courses through radio, television, aboard U.S. Navy ships, and eventually online. Today, the school enrolls over 13,000 students and awards more than 1,300 degrees and 1,300 certificates annually.

== Lowell Institute (1836 - 1907) ==
In 1835, John Lowell, Jr., a wealthy Boston businessman, became gravely ill during a camel trip across the Egyptian desert and wrote his will on the banks of the Nile River in Cairo. In it, he set aside half his estate in a trust to be used for "the maintenance and support of public lectures to be delivered in said Boston upon philosophy, natural history, and the arts and sciences...for the promotion of the moral and intellectual and physical instruction or education of the citizens of the said city of Boston." The lectures were supposed to be free for those of limited means, and for those who could afford to attend more "abstruse" or "erudite" lectures, the maximum charge was to be no more than the value of two bushels of wheat. In an equally egalitarian measure, the lectures were specifically open to women as well as to men. Lowell also directed that lectures be given "on the natural religion showing its conformity to that of our Savior," "on the historical and internal evidences in favor of Christianity," and "avoiding all disputed points of faith and ceremony" by directing the lecturers "to the moral doctrines of the Gospel."

John Lowell, Jr. died on March 4, 1836, shortly after arriving in Bombay, India. Upon his death, his well took effect as his cousin, John Amory Lowell, assumed the role of the first trustee to carry out John Lowell, Jr.'s wishes. On December 31st, 1939, Edward Everett delivered the inaugural address. Days later, the first Lowell Institute lectures were taught by Yale geology professor Benjamin Silliman in January 1940. The Lowell Institute became a prominent center for public education by providing free lectures on a variety of subjects by established scholars and professionals while helping to expand access to higher education in Boston.

== Origins of Harvard University Extension (1907 - 1910) ==
The lack of an endowment was one reason why Harvard President Charles William Eliot declined to begin a continuing education program in 1902. "I would strongly disapprove of starting the proposed institute without an endowment," Eliot said. "It should not be dependent on other institutions."

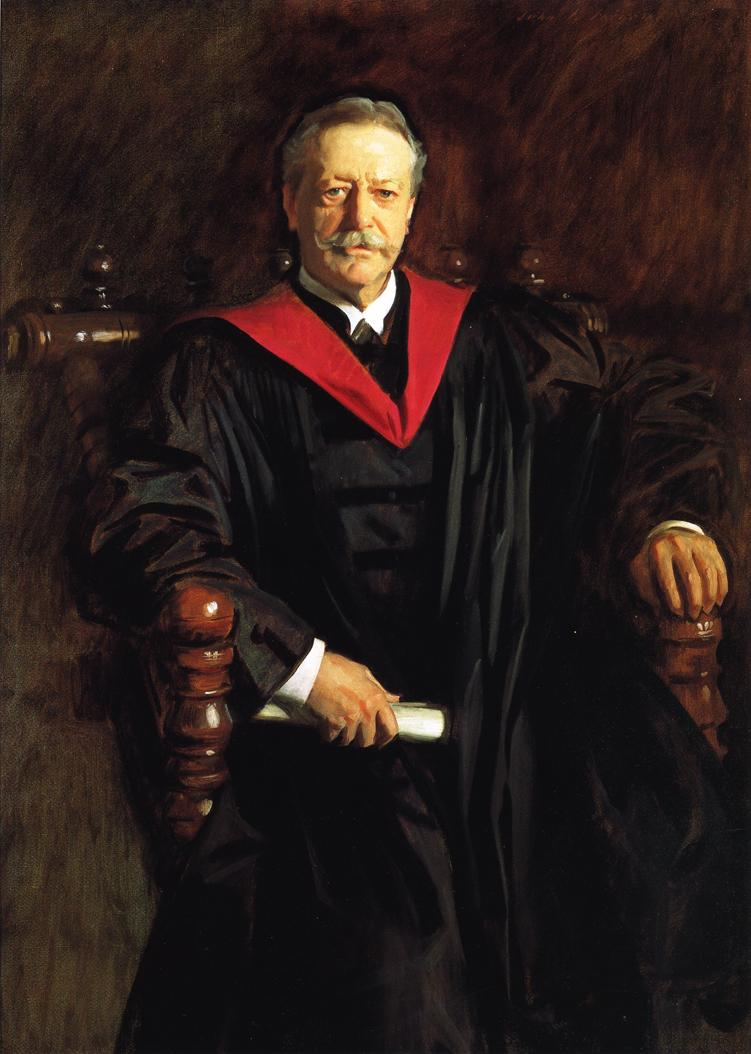
A. Lawrence Lowell

In 1981, after more than forty years administering John Lowell Jr.'s trust, John Amory Lowell was succeeded by his son, Augustus Lowell. Subsequently, in 1900, he was succeeded as trustee by his son, A. Lawrence Lowell. At the time that he succeeded his father as trustee of the Lowell Institute, Lowell was a professor of government and trustee at Harvard University and MIT. He reorganized the lectures first as the School for Industrial Foremen at MIT, and then later renamed it the Lowell Institute School "under the auspices of MIT." The first year of the School had courses in "the higher branches" of mathematics, and the second year was devoted to theory and practice. Between 30 and 50 men graduated from the program each year.

A. Lawrence Lowell sought to expand the Lowell Institute to make university-level education more accessible to those who could not attend college as full-time students. In 1907, he collaborated with Harvard University to offer a variety of free public courses, termed "Collegiate Courses," where Harvard professors taught courses to adult learners in Greater Boston that they taught their Harvard students, maintaining standards and quality of examination. These courses were taught during late afternoons and evenings to facilitate accessibility. Most classes, taught by "the best Harvard professors," had roughly 20 students, and at "the end of the course the same examination is taken" that Harvard College students would take.

In 1909, Lowell was elected president of Harvard University, a position that enabled him to further his visions for the Lowell Institute and higher learning in Boston. At a meeting of the Boston City Club in 1909, A. Lawrence Lowell said that John Lowell, Jr. had wanted to found a "popular university" and that in order to fulfill that vision it had to be connected to an already existing educational institution. As president, A. Lawrence Lowell wanted to serve the "many people in our community, who have not been to college, but who have the desire and the aptitude to profit by so much of a college education as, amid the work of earning their living, they are able to obtain."

The popularity of the Collegiate Courses convinced Lowell that they should be taken in a more systematic approach. In his dual roles as trustee at the Lowell Institute and Harvard University, he formed the Commission on Extension Courses in January 1910. This was a consortium of Boston-area institutions of higher education, including Boston College, Boston University, MIT, Tufts, Wellesley, Simmons College, and the Museum of Fine Arts. Courses taken at the Boston Normal School also counted for credit at one period. Each institution committed to providing courses comparable to Lowell's Harvard University Collegiate Courses, and additionally agreed to award the degree of Associate in Arts to students who completed the equivalent of a college program. Members of the Commission were required to be the president of the university, or an executive there. The Commission also received financial support from the Boston Chamber of Commerce, and it was at a meeting of the Education Committee of the Chamber that the Commission's creation was announced.

Lowell advocated for the formation of the Department of University Extension at Harvard University, which was ultimately approved by Harvard Overseers on February 23, 1910. He appointed James Hardy Ropes, the Hollis Dean of Divinity, to the position of first Dean of the Department of University Extension and additionally naming Ropes the Chairman of Commission on Extension Courses.

In the spring of 1910, a few months before the first students would enroll, A. Lawrence Lowell wrote to the Boston School Department asking which courses the University Extension could offer that the School Department would accept as qualifications for a teaching position at Boston Latin or one of the other high schools in the city. In September of that year, the School Committee voted to accept the Extension's Associate of Arts degree as sufficient to teach in a high school. It was noted that elementary school teachers could take the courses in the evenings and qualify for a better paying high school teaching position. The same was true for other young workers as well, Ropes said.

When the University Extension was announced it garnered major media coverage in Boston. the Boston Globe declared the Extension program to be "one of the hopeful signs of the times--this democratization of education," congratulating the University Extension for "the fine opportunities offered to those who hunger and thirst after knowledge."

== Early Years and Growth (1910 - 1930s) ==
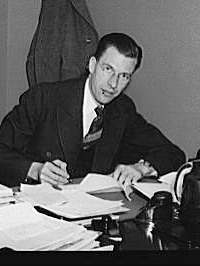
Extension professor John Kenneth Galbraith

University Extension courses, which were "identical with the regular classes offered by Harvard professors," began at the end of September 1910. They offered, according to the Boston Globe, "an opportunity for an education...such has never been obtainable hitherto." Unlike similar extension programs at Columbia University and University of Pennsylvania, the University Extension courses were taught by "the most experienced teachers that can be secured." Early courses included classes on English literature, principles of economics, psychology, and applied and experimental electricity, with laboratory experiments.

In his roles as the Department of University Extension's first dean and Chairman of Commission on Extension Courses, James Hardy Ropes said that "our aim will be to give the young people of Boston who have heretofore been prevented from securing a college education the same instruction they would receive were they undergraduates at Harvard." He added that "many persons who wish that they had a college education will be able to get gradually an effective substitute for it--in some respects more effective than the ordinary college education because of the greater eagerness and maturity of such students." Students under 20 were not permitted, unless they had been graduated from high school, but adults were not required to have a high school diploma.

The Boston Globe opined that the early program of courses was "a comprehensive course of study...which should attract the young men and women of metropolitan Boston who deprived though various circumstances of the opportunity to go to college." A. Lawrence Lowell, as both president of Harvard and trustee of the Lowell Institute, saw the University Extension as "a trust for the community, for the public, and we are nothing but a successive series of servants to the public."

Lowell recognized that Extension courses were administered through the Harvard Faculty of Arts and Sciences with identical courses that could be counted toward a degree from Harvard College or the Radcliffe Institute. Although he believed University Extension courses to match these institution in rigor and quality, he noted that Extension students differed from other Harvard Faculty of Arts and Sciences students in that they were not required to live in residence, and did not need to take an entrance examination for admission to their program. To distinguish the Extension degree from Harvard and Radcliffe Bachelor of Arts degrees, he implemented the Associate in Arts (A.A.) degree for Extension students, intended to be equivalent to a four-year bachelor's degree. In 1913, the Department of University Extension conferred its first Associate in Arts degrees. The recipients, John Coulson of Harvard University and Ellen Marie Greany of Radcliffe College, became the first students to be granted Extension degrees by Harvard University.

When the National University Extension Association was created in 1915, Harvard was a charter member.

After beginning with sixteen course offerings in 1910, the number of courses taught increased to twenty during the 1912-1913 academic year, and twenty-four during the 1915-1916 academic year. A. Lawrence Lowell believed that it was more important to have high quality courses than to offer a larger number of courses, and that there should be a good deal of variety from year to year. University Extension expanded its course catalog to thirty courses by 1951, and was offering seventy courses by 1962. They were "all of the same grade as college courses, involving much the same work, tested by examinations," and would demand "the same amount of work required of a regular college student." A. Lawrence Lowell said that "there is no use in a university's trying to run a kindergarten for the public. The teachers are not fitted for such work. Their object should be to give the public the advantage of those riches which exist within their own walls."

While each member institution of the Commission was represented by their own faculty in course teachings, Harvard University contributed significantly more instructors each year. For example, nearly half of the courses offered during the 1912- 1913 were taught by Harvard University faculty. By the 1920s, affiliates of the Commission on Extension Courses were traveling throughout New England to teach courses off-site. While they were primarily aimed at teachers, courses were offered wherever 40 or more students expressed an interest. Professors traveled long distances on weekly basis, as far as Yonkers, New York, over 200 miles away.

Courses in 1920 cost $5 for a one-hour course, $10 for a two-hour course, and $15 for a three-hour course. The prices were designed to be low enough that "it would not be considered an impediment to anyone who really wanted such instruction" and all courses were offered after working hours. Despite revenue falling due to the Great Depression, A. Lawrence Lowell respected that the will of John Lowell, Jr prevented courses from costing "more than two bushels of wheat." As a result, a half-year course could cost no more than $5, and a full course no more than $10. Some courses cost as little as $2.50. However, increases in salaries required additional funding. To avoid an increase in tuition and the cut in Lowell Institute funding that would follow, an exam fee of $5 was added for those who wished to earn a certificate. These prices remained in effect at least into the 1950s.

== Academic and Institutional Expansion (1930s - 1970s) ==
In 1933, the Connecticut legislature considered and passed a bill allowing junior colleges to award associate degrees for two years study. In the 23 years that the University Extension had been in existence, 120 people had already earned an associate degree from Harvard for four years worth of work. A. Lawrence Lowell, upon hearing this news, was "uncharacteristically impassioned" and asked Dean Whitten, "What is the proper word for a person from whom his good name has been filched? For thou art that man. Read the enclosed and you will see that the name of Associate in Arts has been degraded, probably beyond recovery, by wicked, thievish, and otherwise disreputable institutions." Harvard Faculty of Arts and Sciences responded with a new Adjunct in Arts degree to distinguish Harvard's four-year Extension degree from the two-year associates degree being granted by junior colleges. Women were eligible to receive this degree at Harvard, not just at Radcliff College.

The Depression affected both enrollment figures of the University Extension and the finances of the Lowell Institute, which necessitated cuts in the number of courses offered. During the post-War era, however, the number of courses offered and enrollments were on the rise, including 12 consecutive years between 1951 and 1963.

In 1938, there were 28 faculty members teaching courses for the Commission faculties, including 11 full professors. Early faculty included Charles Townsend Copeland, Theodore Spenser, B.J. Whiting, William Yandell Elliott, Payton S. Wild Jr., William L. Langer, Oscar Handlin, Kenneth B. Murdoch, Perry Miller, William Enerst Hocking, Raphael Demos, John Kenneth Galbraith, Frank M. Carpenter. In 1953 there were still 28 professors, and each was paid an extra stipend to teach the classes in addition to their regular course load.

A 1936 survey found that 56% of students that year had never attended college before. A similar study in 1952 found that more than half had a profession, notably teaching, more than half had at least two years of college, and 75% enrolled out of general interest. In 1938 another survey found that 64% of all Extension graduates went on to do graduate work, a figure much higher than the number of graduates from the College. A total of 60 graduate degrees were awarded to alumni, as were six Ph.D's.

The Adjunct in Arts degree remained the degree obtained by University Extension graduates until 1960, when the Harvard Faculty of Arts and Sciences replaced it with the Bachelor of Arts in Extension Studies (A.B.E.) degree. This was designed specifically for adult learners while maintaining the four-year curriculum equivalence.

Following the Great Depression and World War II, University Extension experienced sustained growth in both enrollment and academic offerings. Enrollment exceeded 5,500 students by 1959-1960 and reached more than 7400 by 1962-1963. By the 50th anniversary of the University Extension in 1960, more than 1,400 courses had been offered and there had been more than 85,000 students.

In 1958, courses cost about $200 each, and in 1963, students could earn a Harvard degree for roughly $1,000. This was, according to Dean Reginald H. Phelps, "a bargain that simply can not be matched anywhere in the field of education." Adding to the value, study spaces, conferences rooms, library facilities, and a dining hall were set up in Lehman Hall for students in 1964. In addition, there was a television lounge where students could watch the WGBH programs.

While the vast majority of classes were held on the Harvard campus, a few in the late 1960s were offered at MIT and BU, as well as at the Old South Meeting House. At this time non-credit courses cost between $15 and $25, and courses for credit cost between $20 and $35.

In 1971, the University implemented the Associate of Arts in Extension Studies (A.A.) degree, representing the equivalent of two-year undergraduate degree.

To meet the needs of the community, the University Extension was stretched from a traditional liberal arts program to "a community vocational arm of the University" with programs specifically designed for residents of Cambridge and Roxbury, as well as an Urban Studies program and a teacher training program. Upon his retirement in 1975 Phelps remarked that "with community needs in mind, Extension has moved a long way from the traditional path," but that "we need to reach far more of the poor than we do."

In 1975 the Commission finally stopped functioning, and the University Extension began as a self-sufficient program. The Lowell Institute continued to give a contribution, though instead of paying for operating costs it was used to fund scholarships for local high school students and faculty to take courses.

In 1979, the Bachelor of Arts in Extension Studies (A.B.E.) degree became the Bachelor of Liberal Arts in Extension Studies (A.L.B.) degree. Additionally, Harvard University established the Master of Liberal Arts in Extension Studies (A.L.M.) degree. The A.L.B. and the A.L.M. remain the two degrees in Extension Studies conferred by Harvard University.

== Distance Education ==
University Extension saw significant advancements in course delivery methods beginning in the mid-twentieth century as new educational technologies emerged.

=== Radio and Television ===
Harvard Extension was a pioneer in distance education. Beginning on December 5, 1949, courses were offered on the Lowell Institute's new radio station. New Englanders could go to college six nights a week at 7:30 in their living rooms simply by tuning into courses on psychology, world history, and economics. The first course on radio was by Peter A. Bertocci of Boston University. For 30 years he taught Extension courses, with never fewer than 100 students. He often over 300 students per course and once had over 400. Over the years Bertocci had at least 7,000 Extension students, "surely a record in the annals of Extension at Harvard."

The radio courses proved to be so successful that when the television station WGBH went on the air in October 1951 they began broadcasting an Extension class every weekday at 3:30 and 7:30. The first course, offered by Robert G. Albion, was on European Imperialism on Monday and Thursday evenings. In the late 1960s, three of the televised courses were offered in the Deer Island Prison. Students who watched the courses on television could attend six "conferences" and take a mid-term and a final exam at Harvard in order to gain credit for the class. The television classes continued at least through the 1970s.

=== United States Navy ===
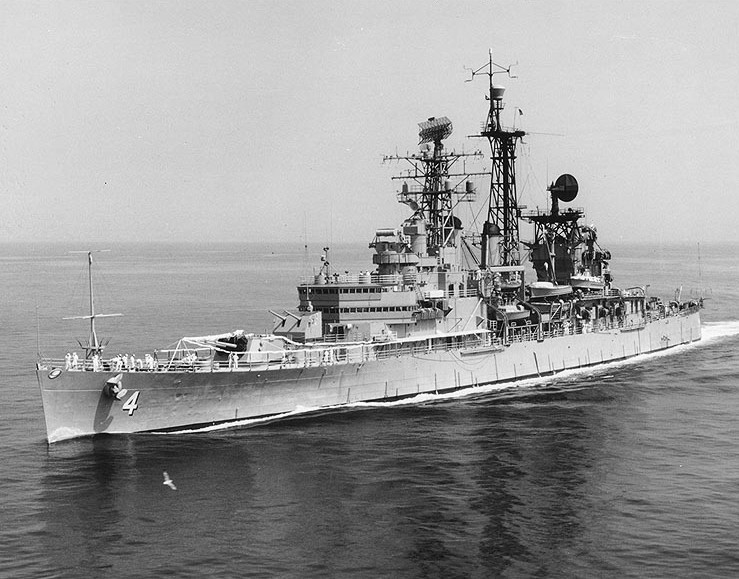
USS Little Rock

In 1960 the United States Navy approached Harvard about adapting the television courses that had been broadcast on WGBH for use on Polaris submarines. A two-year program, known as the Polaris University Extension Program, was developed with WGBH producing five to six courses a year in engineering, math, physics, foreign languages, and electives. Lab courses and in class instruction were provided to the submariners when the subs were in port. Those who finished the course received a certificate of completion.

Eventually the program spread to surface ships as well, being rechristened as the Program for Afloat College Education (PACE), and it "proved to be an effective and practical means of education for hundreds of Navy men." By 1963–64 there were 17 courses, with plans to have 32 within a few years, and 90 sailors enrolled. Just a year later, in 1964–65, there was 440 sailors taking courses, and in 66-67 there were 803 sailors enrolled.

Occasionally, instruction was provided while the ships were at sea. During the 1967 "spring crisis in the Middle East," the Navy paid for five instructors to go to the Mediterranean to teach on the deck of the USS Little Rock (CL-92). In February 1968, five instructors were flown by the Navy to Antarctica to teach at McMurdo Base.

By the time it ended in 1972–73, there were 5,903 registrations by Navy men in 40 classes. The Navy had anticipated huge enrollments, but the Vietnam War made it difficult for men to find the time to study. Additionally, the courses offered were weighted towards the sciences while classes in the humanities proved much more popular.

=== Computer-based and Online Education ===
The Extension School began developing its online Teleteaching Project in the 1980s. In 1984, a calculus course was offered via voice-data modem, kicking off its online education effort. In 1988 a joint venture was developed with Beijing Normal University on a five-week course on artificial intelligence. It was taught in Harvard Square at nights, and the Chinese students simultaneously took the class in what was the morning for them.

In 1985, Harvard Extension School's first computer-based distance learning course ("teleteaching") was offered, subsequently becoming the first "teleteaching" course offered in China in 1989. The first internet-based Harvard Extension School course followed, and in 1997–1998, nearly 100 students, most of them high school students in far flung places such as Alaska or Hawaii, were taking one of six different calculus courses online. Their schools did not offer the course, and the Lowell Scholarships allowed them to take it at a greatly reduced rate. Beginning in 1997, courses were also being videotaped and then put online within 36 hours for distance students to view. In 1999, Harvard College's first online course, Network Programming, was offered through Harvard Extension School.

By 2000, online courses had evolved from an experiment to "an established academic program," and in 2001 there were 25 online courses with 2,200 student enrollments. In 2003, the program had expanded to 36 online courses, including six from Harvard College, and in by 2004 there were 43, including a Harvard College course on US-Europe relations taken simultaneously by Extension students, Harvard graduate and undergraduate students, and students at Institut d'Etudes Politiques de Paris.

In 2005 courses became available as podcasts downloadable on iTunes, and in 2006–2007 there were 100 courses available online. Going online allowed professors to target their classes to specific audiences, such as Latino school teachers or museum professionals in certain regions, and by 2008 more than 25% of the online courses were Harvard College classes.

The school further expanded its online offering with the first live-streamed courses made available in 2006, enabling real-time online attendance, and hybrid courses in 2007, enabling students to participate either remotely on in-person. In 2007-2008, there were more than 7,700 course registrations in online classes, including 4,000 from students who never came to campus for class. 108 classes were offered, including 29 Harvard College classes taught by senior Harvard faculty.

A $1 million grant was awarded in 2005 to build a 6,000 sq ft "of immerse, collaborative learning environments in five classrooms plus a state-of-the-art control room." They went online in 2007 and allowed "greatly enhanced opportunities for pedagogical experimentation." This experimentation and research would be continued with the creation of HarvardX in 2012.

== Harvard Extension School and Modern Development (1985 - Present) ==
In 1985, University Extension was officially renamed Harvard Extension School as part of the establishment of the Harvard Division of Continuing Education, which also includes Harvard Summer School and Harvard Institute for Learning in Retirement. Harvard Extension School now offers over 650 courses across a variety of fields of study.

In 1992 the Indian Computer Academy opened in Bangalore, India, a joint venture between the Extension School and an Indian businessman with offices in Bombay (India), and Dedham, Massachusetts. The program at the Academy was designed to consist of one year of full-time study leading to Certificate in Applied Sciences. From the beginning, the principals in India were treating it like a for-profit venture, and financially it was a failure. Harvard pulled out in 1994, but not before approximately 150 students were educated in the two years of operation.

There were 452 degree recipients in the 58 years between 1910 and 1968, and 481 in the 39 between 1969 and 2008. Including certificates, there have been 12,464 graduates in Extension's history. In 2013 there were 163 undergraduate degree earners, the largest class to date, bringing the total to 5,415 graduates. As of 2009, the five most popular graduate programs are in government, biology, psychology, history, and English, accounting for 75% of graduates.

By 1953, undergraduate degree holders went on to earn 16 Master of Arts degrees, 11 Masters of Education, one Bachelor of Sacred Theology, and five Doctors of Philosophy. Since the founding, there have been 250 students who earned an undergraduate degree at the Extension School and then an advanced degree at Harvard, including 30 doctorates. Approximately 10% of ALM graduates have gone on to doctorates, including 16 at Harvard. There have been 328 AA and AB degrees awarded to employees since TAP was started in 1978, 105 ALMs, and 166 certificates.

During the six years Huntington D. Lambert was dean, the number of students grew to more than 30,000. His first year in office, there were 645 graduates. His last year in office, 2019, there were more than 1,200 graduates. The graduating class of 2019, the largest class to date, had 1184 students receiving degrees. The students had an average age of 37 and were nearly equally split between the genders, with 54% being male. The graduating class had students from 49 different countries.

A proposal before the Faculty of Arts and Science in 2009 and 2010 to rename the school and the degrees offered was not accepted. A committee, led by Professor of Computer Science Harry R. Lewis, proposed renaming the school the "Harvard School of Continuing and Professional Studies," and to drop the words "in Extension Studies" from degrees, so that the School would offer Bachelor of Arts and Master of Arts degrees. Some faculty objected, saying that those degrees were already offered by the College and the Graduate School of Arts and Sciences.

After 100 years, an estimated 500,000 students have taken courses at the Extension School.

=== Graduate and Professional Programs ===
In 1980 the first master's degree (ALM) was awarded. The next year restrictions were lifted on the degree, and 741 students enrolled in the program. Demands of the labor market meant new initiatives in professional studies had to grow along with the traditional liberal arts programs. A graduate Certificate of Advanced Study was established in 1977 for a full year of study in humanities, social sciences, or natural sciences. Due to the success of the ALM, however, this certificate was phased out after 1985.

The certificate's success prompted the creation of a Certificate of Special Studies in Administration and Management in 1980 for students with a bachelor's degree but no prior training in business or management. In 2007 it became an ALM in Management, which soon became the most popular program at the Extension School.

To meet the growing need for biotech industry staff in the Boston area, a Certificate of Advanced Studies in Applied Sciences was established in 1982. In 1986 a Certificate of Public Health was launched, and first award to a Greek pharmacist in 1987. This was followed in 1989 by a Certificate in Museum Studies. In time museum studies would become a master's degree concentration and the certificate was discontinued. The Certificate in Publishing and Communications was created in 1995, and the ALM in Information Technology was established in 1996.

In 2001–02 a pilot program was created to address the shortage of qualified math teachers in the Boston Public Schools. One in five middle and high school math teachers, for a total of 86 Boston teachers, took 117 classes. This led to the creation of an ALM in Mathematics for Teaching 2004. A Certificate in Technologies of Education was created in 2000–01 which grew to become an ALM in Educational Technologies in 2005–06. Also beginning in 2004, ALMs could be earned in biotechnology or environmental management. The following year the ALM in Journalism, the first journalism degree offered at Harvard, was established. In 2018 an ALM in the field of data science was added to expand the existing certificate program.

=== Pre-medical Program ===
A pre-med program was established at the Extension School in 1980. Two years later, in 1982, five students applied to medical school, and 3 were accepted at the University of Massachusetts, Tufts University, and New York University. Of the 19 students who applied to medical schools in 1985, 15 were admitted, including two women to Harvard Medical School.

All 27 graduates who applied to medical school in 1989 were accepted, including three to Harvard Medical School and nine to the University of Massachusetts. Five years later, 90% of students were accepted to medical school, including 5 to Harvard. Only one in three were accepted nationwide. The Health Careers Program has sponsored nearly 1,000 students for admission to medical school since it was started in 1979–80, and more than 845 were accepted. This 85% success rate far exceeds the national acceptance rate of 35%.

Year	Enrollment
1910–11	863
1914	1,034
1915	1,488
1919	~1,300
1922–23	1,727
1930–31	1,690
1934–35	871
1942–43	808
1945–46	1,243
1946–47	1,528
1947–48	1,955
1951–52	2,062
1952–53	2,141
1956–57	2,890
1959–60	5,500+
1962–63	7,448
1963–64	8,435
1963–64	8,693
1971–72	10,000+
1974–75	9,677
1975–76	9,705
1977–78	~11,677
1979–80	12,567
1981–82	17,034
1983–84	19,561
1984–85	20,366
1986–87	20,578
1990–91	~22,500
1999–2000	~24,000
2007–08	25,000+
2018	30,000

== Deans ==
- James Hardy Ropes, Chairman of Commission on Extension Courses, Dean of University Extension, 1910–1922
- Arthur F. Whittem, Chairman of Commission on Extension Courses, Director of University Extension, 1922–1946
- George W. Adams, Chairman of Commission on Extension Courses, Director of University Extension, 1946–1949
- Reginald H. Phelps, Chairman of Commission on Extension Courses, Director of University Extension, 1949–1975
- Michael Shinagel, Director of Continuing Education and University Extension, 1975–1977, and Dean of Continuing Education and University Extension, 1977–2013
- Huntington D. Lambert, Dean of Continuing Education and University Extension, 2013–2019
- Nancy Coleman, Dean of Continuing Education and University Extension, 2020-Present

== Works cited ==
- Shinagel, Michael (2010), The Gates Unbarred: A History of University Extension at Harvard, 1910–2009, Harvard University Press, ISBN 978-0674051355
