= Harvard Extension School =

Extension school of Harvard University

Coordinates: 42.3743°N 71.1216°W

- Motto: Veritas
- Motto in English: "Truth"
- Type: Private extension school
- Established: 1910; 116 years ago
- Parent institution: Harvard University
- Dean: Nancy Coleman
- Undergraduates: 795
- Postgraduates: 3,100
- Location: Cambridge, Massachusetts, US
- Campus: Urban
- Website: extension.harvard.edu

Harvard Extension School (HES) is the continuing education school of Harvard University, a private Ivy League research university in Cambridge, Massachusetts, United States. Established in 1910, it is one of the oldest extension schools in the United States. Part of the Harvard Faculty of Arts and Sciences, Harvard Extension School is one of Harvard University's 13 degree-granting schools. While most courses are offered on an open-enrollment basis, Harvard Extension School also offers selective undergraduate and graduate degree programs, academic certificate programs, and a post-baccalaureate pre-medical certificate, primarily for adult learners and nontraditional students.

Emerging from a collaboration between Harvard University and the Lowell Institute, founded in 1836, Harvard Extension School was established by then-Harvard president A. Lawrence Lowell in 1910 to extend Harvard's educational opportunities, equivalent in academic rigor to traditional Harvard programs, to nontraditional and part-time students, as well as lifelong learners. Under the supervision of the Harvard Faculty of Arts and Sciences, the school offers more than 675 courses spanning various liberal arts and professional disciplines, offered in on-campus, online, and hybrid formats. Most courses are available to both its matriculated students and to the general public.

Degrees earned through the Harvard Extension School are formally conferred by Harvard University under the authority of the Faculty of Arts and Sciences. They include the Bachelor of Liberal Arts (A.L.B.) and Master of Liberal Arts (A.L.M.). Harvard Extension School degree recipients are Harvard alumni.

== History ==
The school was founded in 1910 by Harvard president A. Lawrence Lowell who built on his work with the Lowell Institute. He wanted to tether his work to a "proper university" and serve the "many people in our community, who have not been to college, but who have the desire and the aptitude to profit by so much of a college education as, amid the work of earning their living, they are able to obtain." It was designed to serve the educational interests and needs of the Greater Boston community, particularly those "who had the ability and desire to attend college, but also had other obligations that kept them from traditional schools".

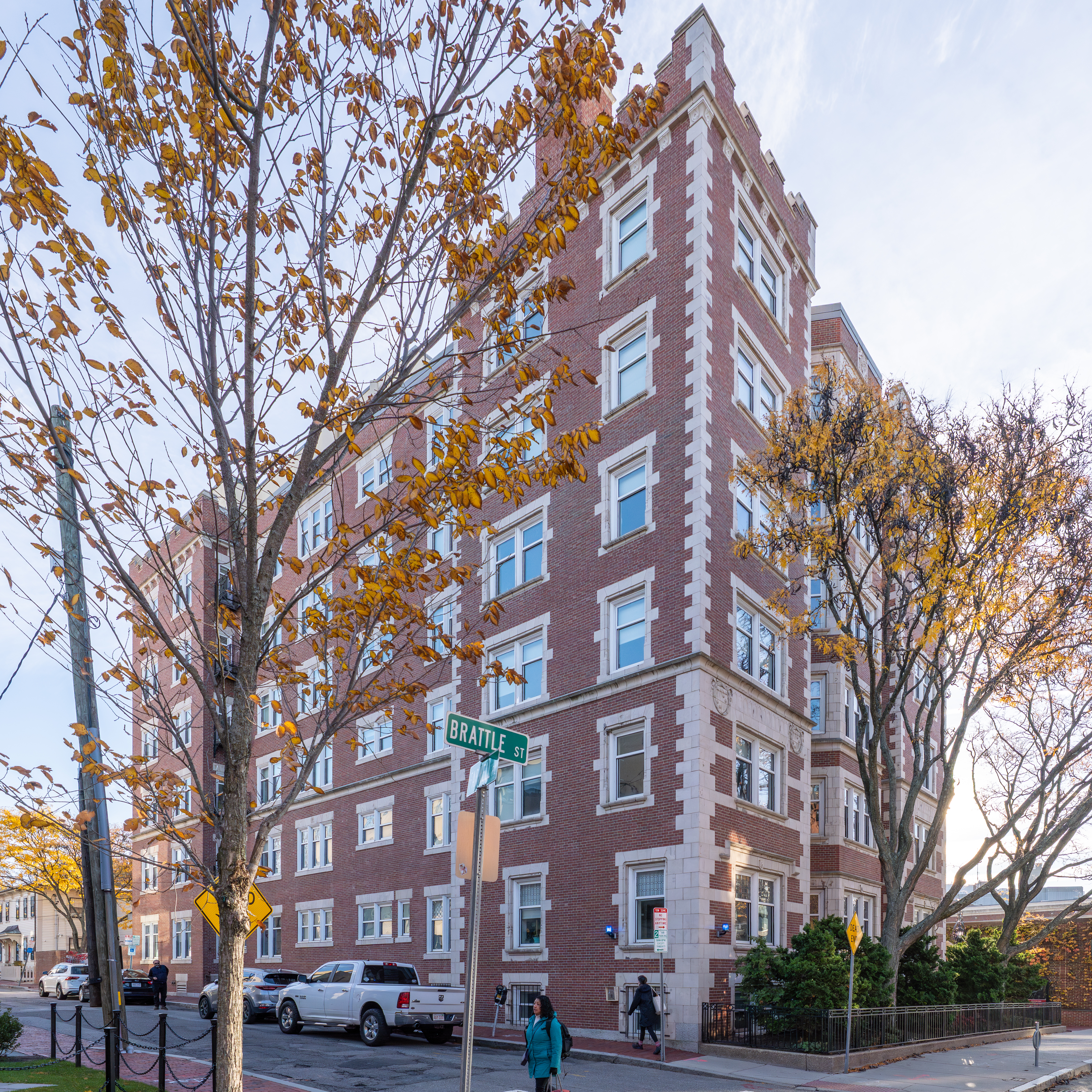
The Harvard Extension School building

James Hardy Ropes, Extension's first dean, said that "our aim will be to give the young people of Boston who have heretofore been prevented from securing a college education the same instruction they would receive were they undergraduates at Harvard [College]". He added that "many persons who wish that they had a college education will be able to get gradually an effective substitute for it--in some respects more effective than the ordinary college education because of the greater eagerness and maturity of such students".

In the early years, a commission composed of several Boston area schools ran the courses, though it was largely a Harvard-run program. Early faculty included Charles Townsend Copeland, William Yandell Elliott, William L. Langer, Oscar Handlin, Perry Miller, John Kenneth Galbraith, and Frank M. Carpenter. During the 1920s, affiliates traveled around New England to teach courses offsite. While they were primarily aimed at teachers, courses were offered whenever 40 or more students expressed an interest. Professors traveled on a weekly basis to places as far away as Yonkers, New York, some 200 miles away.

Lowell's bequest limited tuition to no more than "two bushels of wheat". During the Great Depression, this amounted to roughly $5 per semester course. Several years after his retirement, president Lowell wrote that the Extension courses "have given a service to the public ... which seems to me of the utmost importance." In his will, John Lowell asked his successors to develop courses "more erudite and particular corresponding to the age". By the 50th anniversary of the Commission on Extension Courses in 1960, more than 1,400 courses had taught to over 85,000.

In the 2010s, more than 100 years after its founding, the Extension School's classes were described as "surprisingly affordable" and the school itself was said to be a "thriving institution."

The Extension School currently offers two degrees (and has offered these degrees since 1979): the Bachelor of Liberal Arts in Extension Studies (ALB) and the Master of Liberal Arts in Extension Studies (ALM). From 1911 to 1933, the school offered an Associate in Arts, and from 1933 to 1960, it offered an Adjunct in Arts. Both were considered the equivalent of a bachelor's degree. From 1971 to 2014, the school offered an Associate of Arts in Extension Studies (AA), the equivalent of a two-year degree.

=== Deans ===
The dean of the extension school is also the Dean of the Harvard Division of Continuing Education, who works under and reports directly to the Dean of Harvard Faculty of Arts and Sciences. There have been seven deans in the school's history and three are alumni of Harvard College:

- James Hardy Ropes, Chairman of Commission on Extension Courses, Dean of University Extension, 1910–1922
- Arthur F. Whittem, Chairman of Commission on Extension Courses, Director of University Extension, 1922–1946
- George W. Adams, Chairman of Commission on Extension Courses, Director of University Extension, 1946–1949
- Reginald H. Phelps, Chairman of Commission on Extension Courses, Director of University Extension, 1949–1975
- Michael Shinagel, Director of Continuing Education and University Extension, 1975–1977, and Dean of Continuing Education and University Extension, 1977–2013
- Huntington D. Lambert, Dean of Continuing Education and University Extension, 2013–2019 (Note: Between Lambert's retirement and Coleman's appointment, Henry H. Leitner served as interim dean.)
- Nancy Coleman, Dean of the Division of Continuing Education, 2020–present

== Accreditation and partnerships ==
Harvard University is accredited by the New England Commission of Higher Education.

Harvard Business School Online's Credential of Readiness (CORe) program can be counted for Extension School undergraduate academic credit on a pass fail basis.

The graduate program in Museum Studies has a partnership with the Smithsonian Institution. The partnered courses include two active learning weekends in Washington, D.C. Harvard Extension School has collaborated with Massachusetts Institute of Technology Micromasters program for Management, Sustainability, and Development Practice Masters degree program.

== Academics ==
Year	Courses offered
1910	16
1915–15	24
1918–19	33
1921–22	22
1922–23	27
1923–24	29
1951–52	30
1953–54	32
1956–57	37
1959–60	56
1962–63	70
1971–72	144
1974–75	135
1975–76	~200
1979–80	316
1980–81	335
1981–82	398
1983–84	480
1984–85	527
1986–87	575
1999–2000	584
2016	~800
2018	(Note: Approximately 600 of the courses were offered online.)
2019	>900

Part of the Harvard Faculty of Arts and Sciences, Harvard Extension School offers more than 900 on-campus and online courses, most of which have open enrollment. The number of courses offered has continuously grown over the school's history.

Students may enroll full or part-time, and classes may be taken on campus, via distance-learning, or both. In order to earn an academic degree, students must complete a minimum number of on-campus-only credits at Harvard. (Note: n.b. These requirements vary for each degree, from 4 classes in residency for the ALB or the ALM/Biology, two semesters residency requirement for the general ALM, and up to 50% residency requirement for the ALM/Management. It is therefore not possible to receive an academic degree solely through distance learning.) Since the school's inception, it has only graduated less than two out of every thousand (0.2%) of its students. As of 2009, nearly 13,000 have graduated with degrees. (Note: The degree graduates at Harvard Extension School are both recognized and considered to be alumni of the Harvard Extension Alumni Association (HEAA) and Harvard Alumni Association (HAA) The degree holders have their name recorded in HAA list and directory. The degrees ALB and ALM are directly issued by Harvard Faculty of Arts and Sciences. The Harvard Extension School is one among 13 schools that make Harvard University.)

In August 2018, Grossman Library, located in Sever Hall, merged with the larger Harvard College Library system, giving non-degree students access to the Harvard Library, including electronic resources and select computer facilities. Those registered for a course at the Extension School may also access writing tutorials at the Writing Center as well as assistance with math and related courses at the Math Question Center. Career services and academic advising are offered through the school's Career and Academic Resource Center.

Ropes, the school's first dean, said that "our aim will be to give the young people of Boston who have heretofore been prevented from securing a college education the same instruction they would receive were they undergraduates at Harvard." The Harvard Undergraduate Council found in a 2020 study of Extension courses that 156 were identical or nearly identical to courses at Harvard College and 95 were equivalent or similar, while 344 were unique to the Extension School. A New York Times guidebook stated that professors said some courses were "virtually identical." As of the 2022-2023 academic year, courses for undergraduate credit at the Extension School were $1,980 and courses for graduate credit were $3,100.

A number of on-campus Harvard courses are recorded and offered to Extension students online. For these courses, office hours and other student support are typically available through live or asynchronous software. The majority of instructors at the Extension School, 52%, are Harvard affiliates; 48% are faculty from peer schools and industry professionals. Nobel laureate Roy J. Glauber has taught Extension courses.

=== Special student ===
Extension degree candidates are eligible to apply for "Special Student status," allowing them to enroll for either one or two courses in Harvard College, Harvard Graduate School of Arts and Sciences, or another Harvard graduate School.

=== Pre-medical program ===
A pre-medical program was established at the Extension School in 1979. Students who successfully complete the program are eligible for sponsorship and a committee letter of support in their applications to medical school.

=== Distance education ===
Harvard Extension was a pioneer in distance education. Beginning on December 5, 1949, courses were offered on the Lowell Institute's new radio station. New Englanders could go to college six nights a week at 7:30 in their living rooms simply by tuning into courses on psychology, world history, and economics. The first course on radio was by Peter A. Bertocci of Boston University.

The radio courses proved to be so successful that when the television station WGBH went on the air in October 1951 they began broadcasting an Extension class every weekday at 3:30 and 7:30. The first course, offered by Robert G. Albion, was on European Imperialism. In the late 1960s, three of the televised courses were offered in the Deer Island Prison. Students who watched the courses on television could attend six "conferences" and take a mid-term and a final exam at Harvard in order to gain credit for the class.

As of 2014, distance-learning courses at Harvard Extension School are offered in two formats: asynchronous video courses (lectures are recorded and uploaded within 24 hours of on-campus class meetings); and live web-conference courses (courses are streamed live, and typically allow for synchronous participation from students via a secondary online platform).

The first online courses were offered in 1997. Between 2013 and 2016, the number of online classes grew from 200 to more than 450.

=== Degree programs ===
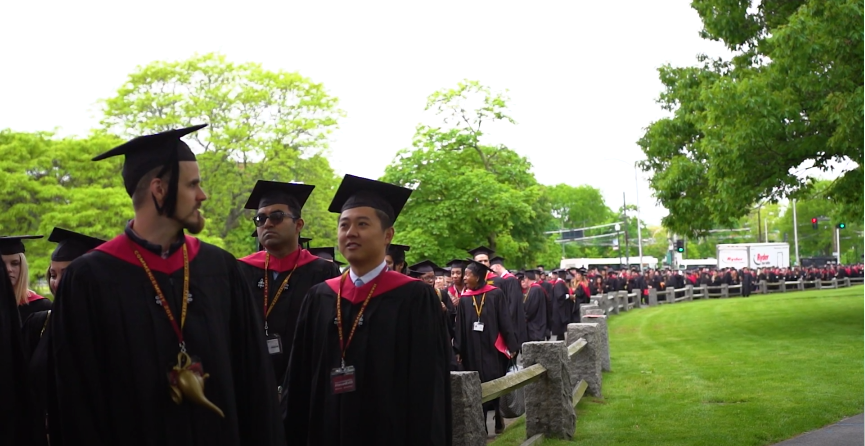
Harvard University Extension School Commencement 2019

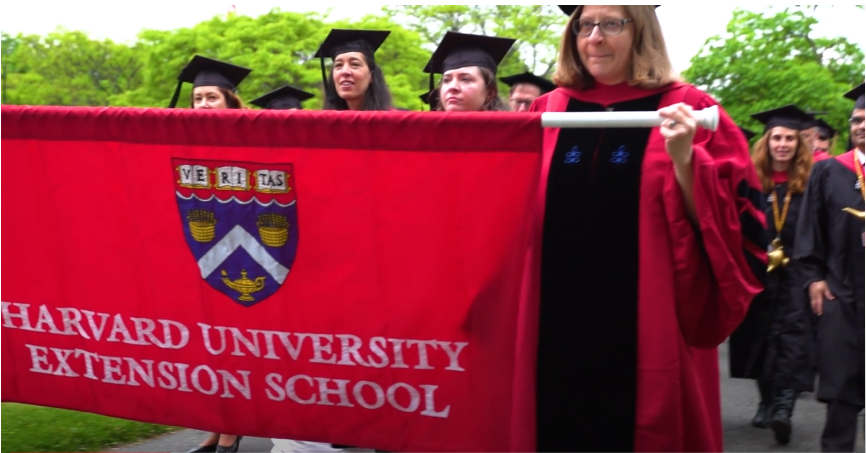
Harvard University Extension School Procession commencement procession at Harvard Yard

Year	Associate	Bachelor's	Master's	References
1913–1933	120	n/a	n/a	(Note: From 1913 until 1932 Harvard offered Associate in Arts degrees, and from 1933 until 1962 it awarded Adjunct in Arts degrees. Both were considered the equivalent of a bachelor's degree.)
1934–1936	24	n/a	n/a	
1937–1952	78	n/a	n/a	
1953	6	n/a	n/a	
1954–1962	57	n/a	n/a	
1963	n/a	14	n/a	
1964	n/a	22	n/a	
1966	n/a	35	n/a	
1967	n/a	31	n/a	
1968	n/a	48	n/a	
1971	n/a	38	n/a	
1972	44	54	n/a	
1975	37	42	n/a	
1976	<82	<82	n/a	(Note: Only aggregate numbers were reported for these years.)
1980	n/a	?	1	
1981	n/a	?	3	
1982	n/a	91	15	
1985	n/a	<158	<158	
1987	n/a	<143	<143	
2000	<226	<226	<226	
2008	7	111	91	
2013	<645	<645	<645	
2014	5	152	539	
2016	8	148	627	
2017	7	144	706	
2018	4	153	890	
2019	3	159	962	
2020	0	166	1,070	
2022	0	192	1,287	

To be eligible to apply to the Extension School's degree programs, students must "earn [their] way in" by passing the Test of Critical Reading and Writing Skills as well as completing two or three designated admission classes with a B or better. In 2016, then-Dean Huntington D. Lambert said that 32% of those who want to pursue an undergraduate degree (ALB) earn the grades necessary for admission, making admissions "very selective." If the admission requirements are met, acceptance is not guaranteed but very likely. About 85% of those admitted successfully earn their degree (ALB).

ALB students may graduate cum laude, but magna and summa cum laude are not offered. Extension students may earn the Dean's List Academic Achievement Award upon graduation based on a high GPA (at least 3.5 for ALB, 3.8 for ALM). Many courses are offered online, but a degree cannot be earned entirely online as students are required to take classes on campus before earning their degree.

Students who wish to earn degrees must be formally admitted by the Admissions Committee. Admitted degree candidates are granted full privileges to Harvard's libraries, facilities, and student resources, as well as access to Harvard's museums and academic workshops. As of 2019–20, an undergraduate degree cost about $58,800, and a graduate degree cost about $28,400–$34,080.

Of the over 30,000 students enrolled in the Extension School, 850 are admitted degree candidates for the Bachelor of Liberal Arts in Extension Studies (A.L.B.) and 3,063 are admitted degree candidates for the Master of Liberal Arts in Extension Studies (A.L.M.).

==== Bachelor of Liberal Arts (A.L.B.) ====
The undergraduate curriculum requires expository writing, quantitative reasoning, foreign language, moral reasoning, upper-level coursework, and an area of concentration. The expository writing class is known as a "gatekeeper course" as it will typically "determine whether [students] are prepared for the intensive and demanding curriculum."

Once admitted as an ALB degree candidate, students must successfully complete 128 credits (Harvard courses are typically 4 credits each) and maintain good academic standing to meet graduation requirements. Upon admission into the ALB program, students may petition to transfer up to a maximum of 64 credits from other accredited post-secondary institutions, but at least 64 credits must be completed at Harvard. Students select one of three "areas of concentration" which are humanities, science, and social sciences.

ALB degree candidates are also required to complete a minimum of 16 on-campus-only credits at Harvard; students must also complete a minimum of 12 writing-intensive credits and earn a minimum of 52 credits in courses that are taught by Harvard instructors. In addition to a concentration, degree candidates have the option to pursue one of twenty "fields of study" (similar to majors). In order to successfully complete a field of study, students must earn a B− or higher in 32 Harvard credits in one field, and maintain a B average in the field. Students may also complement their degree with up to two minors.

==== Master of Liberal Arts (A.L.M.) ====
The Master of Liberal Arts (ALM) encompasses over 20 fields of study across the liberal arts and professional disciplines. Subjects range from traditional humanities and social sciences (such as Anthropology, English, History, and Psychology) to specialized professional and STEM programs (including Biotechnology, Data Science, Cybersecurity, Management, and Sustainability). All ALM candidates must complete 12 courses—48 credit hours—to earn their degree. Most fields of study require students to complete either an in-depth thesis or a capstone project, which is typically crafted under the direction of an instructor or faculty member holding a teaching appointment in the Harvard Faculty of Arts and Sciences.

=== Degree-naming convention ===
The formal titles of the Harvard University undergraduate and graduate degrees are Baccalaureus in Artibus Liberalibus (ALB) and Magister in Artibus Liberalibus (ALM). The bachelor's diploma is issued by Harvard University in English, conferring the degree of "Bachelor of Liberal Arts in Extension Studies." Consistent with Harvard University's Faculty of Arts and Sciences tradition for graduate degrees, the master's diploma is issued in Latin, conferring the degree of "Magister in Artibus Liberalibus."

Over the years, there have been efforts by faculty and students to remove the phrase "in Extension Studies" from the school's degrees. In 2009 and 2010, a faculty committee proposed renaming the school and dropping the phrase, but the proposal was rejected due to concerns that the new degree titles would be too similar to those offered by Harvard College and the Graduate School of Arts and Sciences. Since then, students have continued to advocate for degree names that reflect their specific fields of study, organizing rallies in 2016, 2022, and 2023. Although former Dean Huntington D. Lambert publicly agreed with the students' concerns in 2019, the official degree titles remain unchanged; however, students' official transcripts do reflect their specific areas of academic concentration or fields of study.

=== Privileges and demographics ===
Students who graduate with a degree from the Extension School become part of the Harvard Alumni Association. Extension students have dedicated study spaces, conferences rooms, and access to the dining hall in Lehman Hall. Alpha Sigma Lambda, the national honor society for nontraditional students, has a Harvard chapter. There is a student government body for the Harvard Extension School which participates in the Harvard Graduate Council. Admitted degree candidates have access to many of the same student privileges of other Harvard alumni, such as access to athletic facilities, libraries, and museums.

The Extension School primarily serves working professionals and adult learners. As of 2026, the average age of the student body is 32, with students representing all 50 U.S. states and over 110 countries. The student body is generally divided between individuals taking single courses for professional enrichment and those formally pursuing a degree.

Historically, the student body has included a wide range of educational backgrounds. In 2000, the school enrolled over 14,000 students; at that time, 75% of enrolled students already held a bachelor's degree and more than 1,700 were Harvard employees using the Tuition Assistance Program. While the school occasionally allowed high-school-aged minors to enroll during the early 2000s, it has since implemented strict age requirements to focus exclusively on adult learners. The Extension School now requires that a high school diploma or its equivalent is earned at least five years prior to enrolling in any courses applicable to its undergraduate degree.

The Extension School enrolls thousands of international students each year. While international degree candidates must meet the same on-campus residency requirements as domestic students, the Extension School itself does not issue F-1 student visas for its part-time fall and spring semesters. Instead, international students typically fulfill these residency requirements by obtaining short-term F-1 visas through Harvard Summer School to attend intensive on-campus sessions.

== Student life ==
Harvard Extension School degree students can work as faculty aides and research assistants for instructors at the university. They can also run for elections in the Harvard Graduate Council and participate in Harvard Innovation Labs activities. The Harvard Extension Student Association has three student clubs and five different societies: the Psychological Student Society, the Creative Writing & Literature Student Society, the Industrial Organizational Psychology Student Society, the Global Development Practice Student Society, and the Veteran Student Society.

== Notable people ==
=== Alumni ===
Notable alumni include:

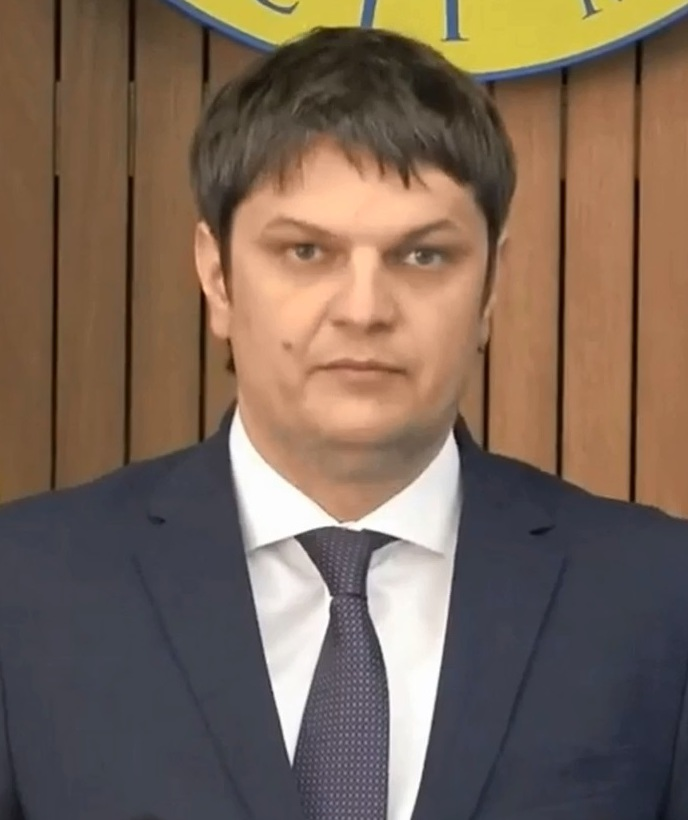
Andrei Spînu (ALM), Deputy Prime Minister of Moldova

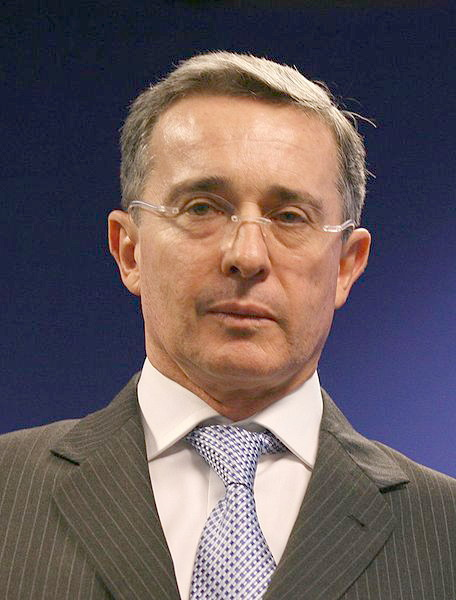
Álvaro Uribe (CSS), 31st President of Colombia

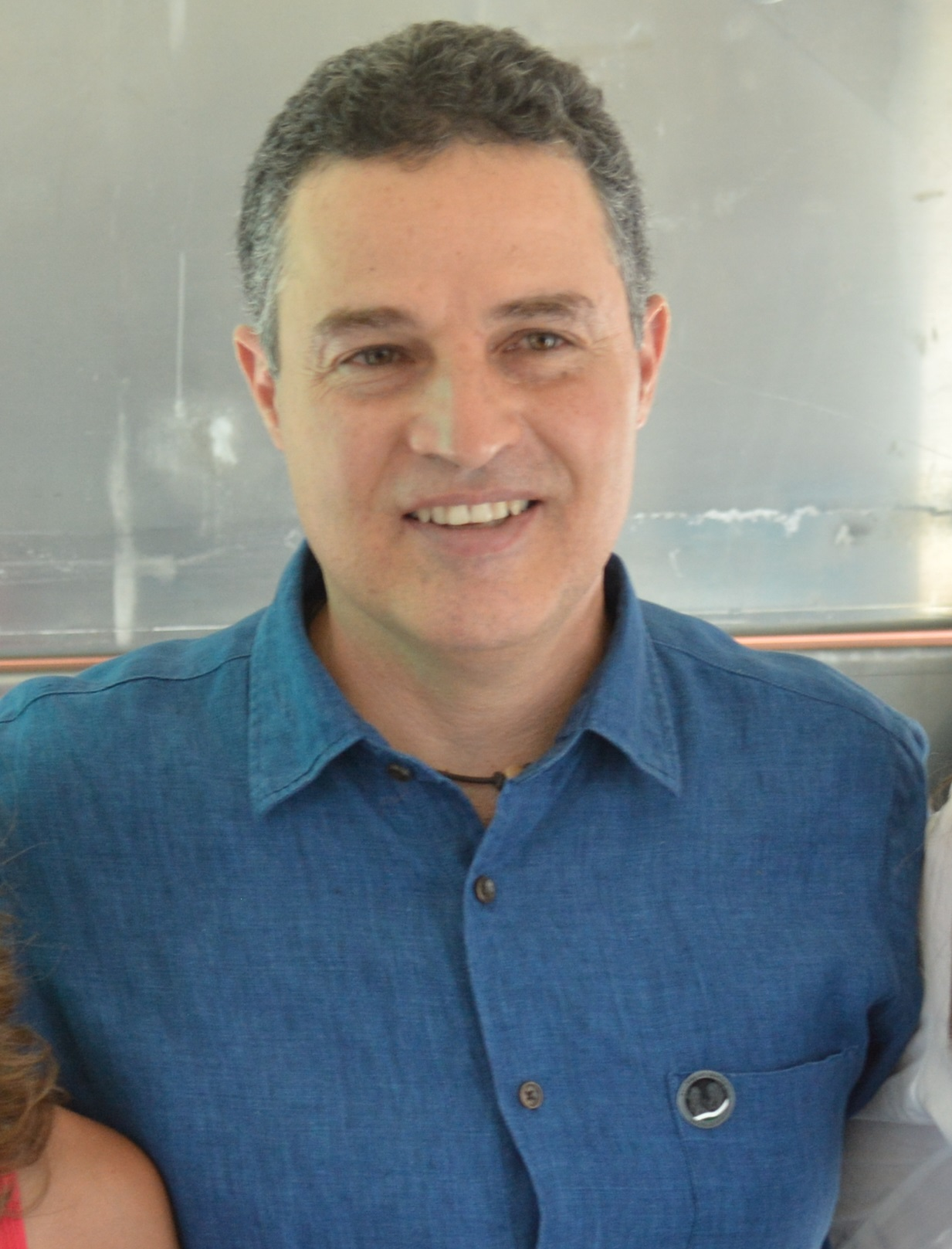
Aníbal Gaviria, Governor of Antioquia

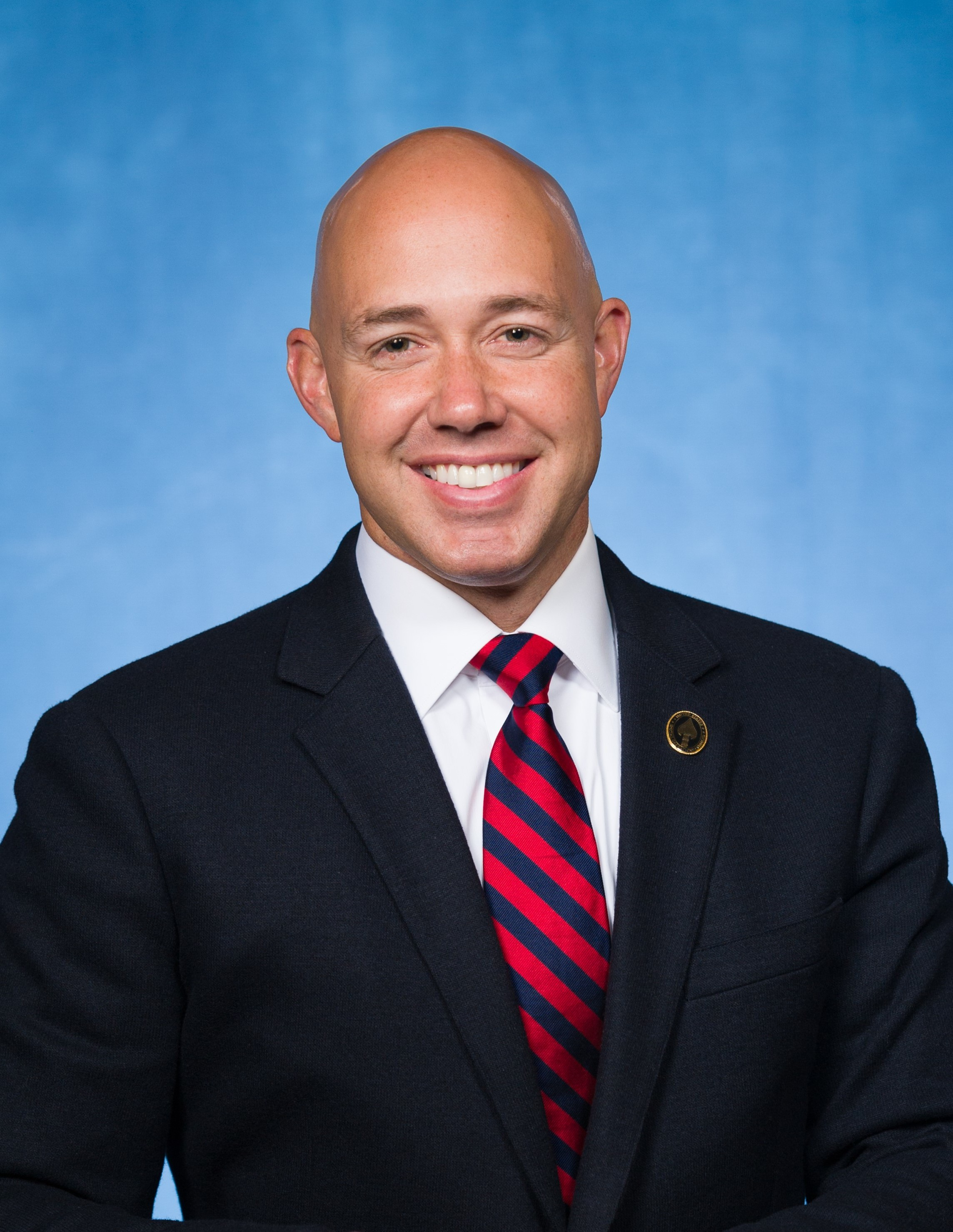
Brian Mast (ALB), U.S. representative for Florida's 21st congressional district

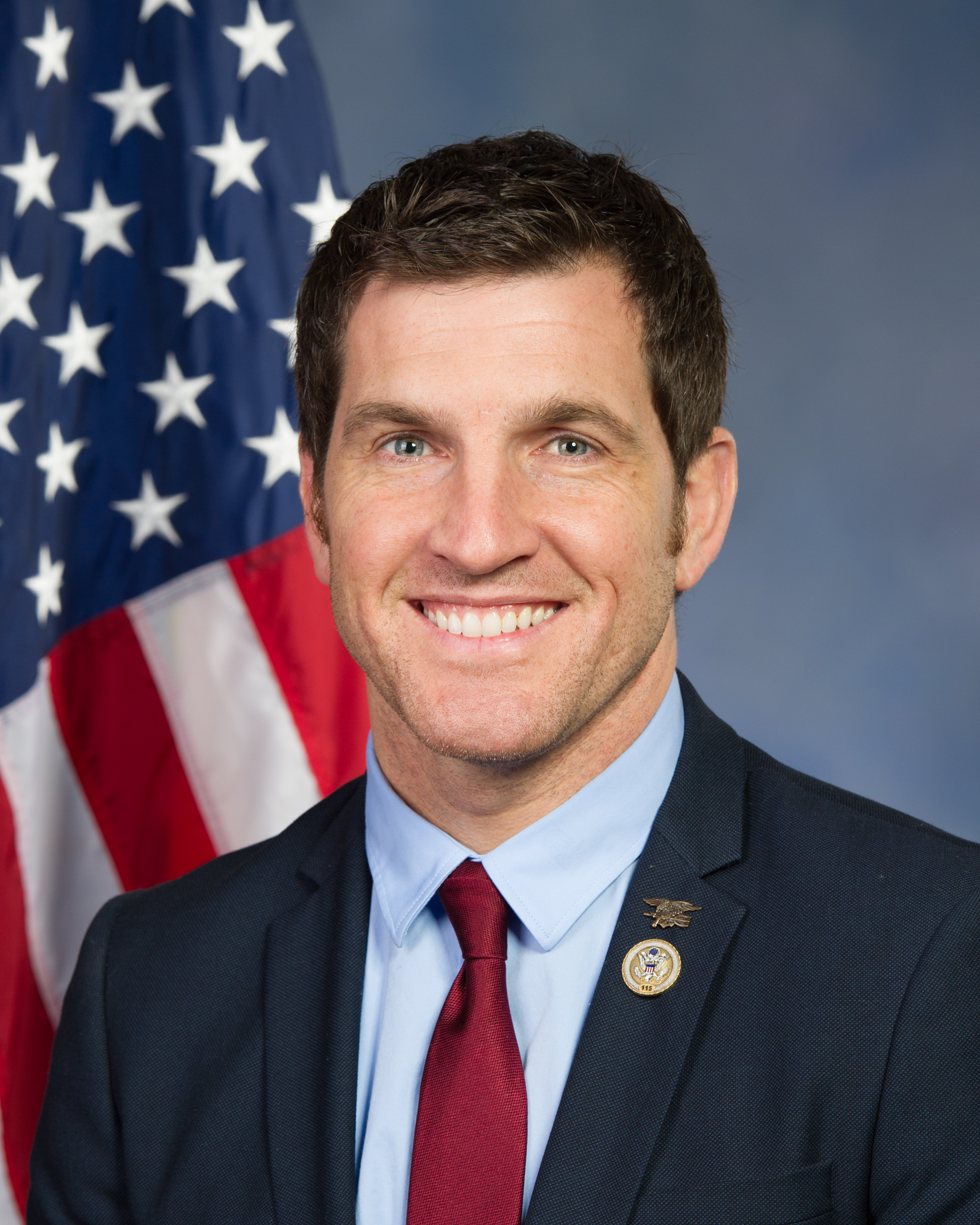
Scott Taylor (ALB, ALM), U.S. representative for Virginia's 2nd congressional district

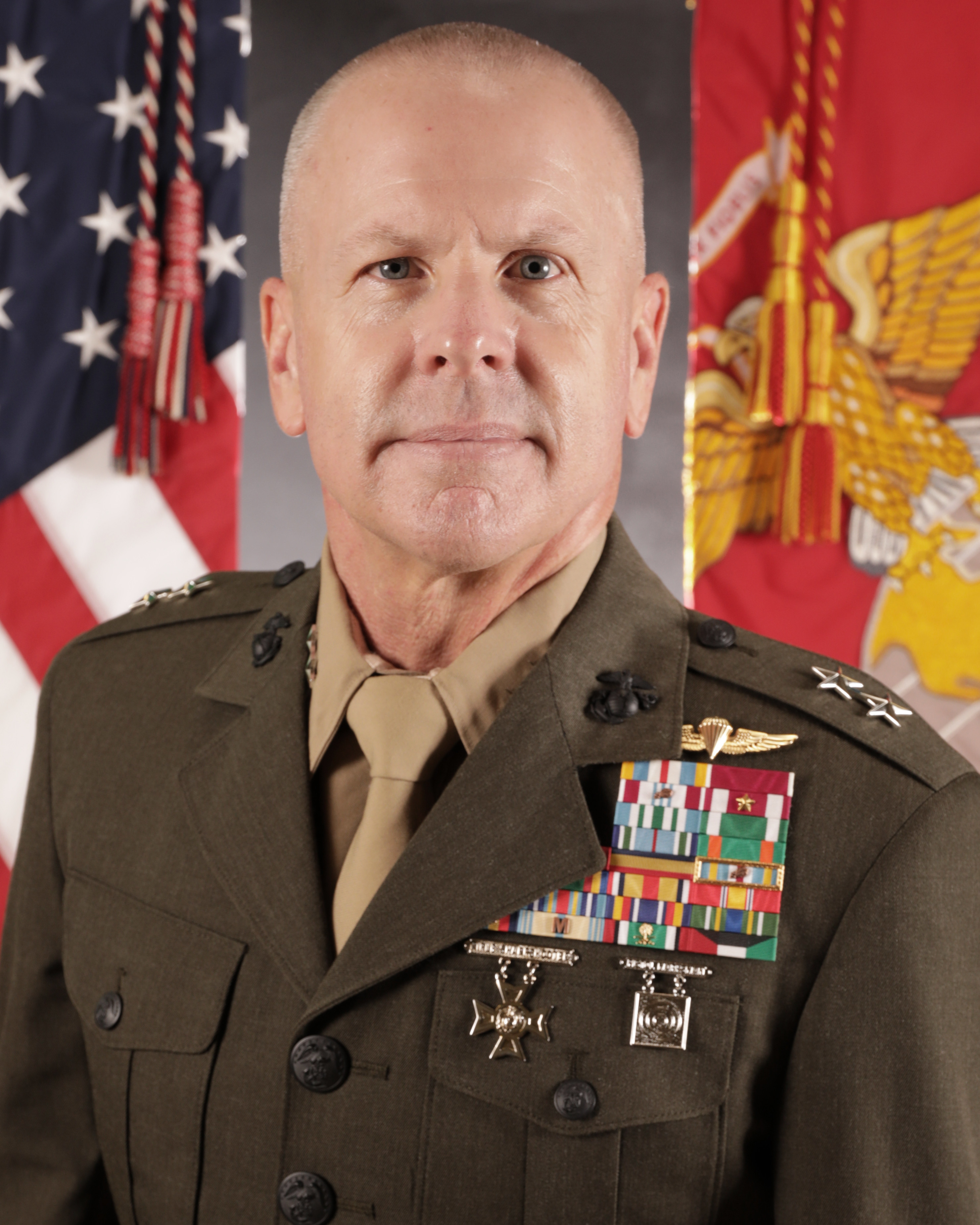
MajGen Michael F. Fahey (ALM 2012), (Note: MajGen Michael F. Fahey earned ALM in Management and was an enrolled student from 2008 to 2012.) Commanding General of the 4th Marine Division

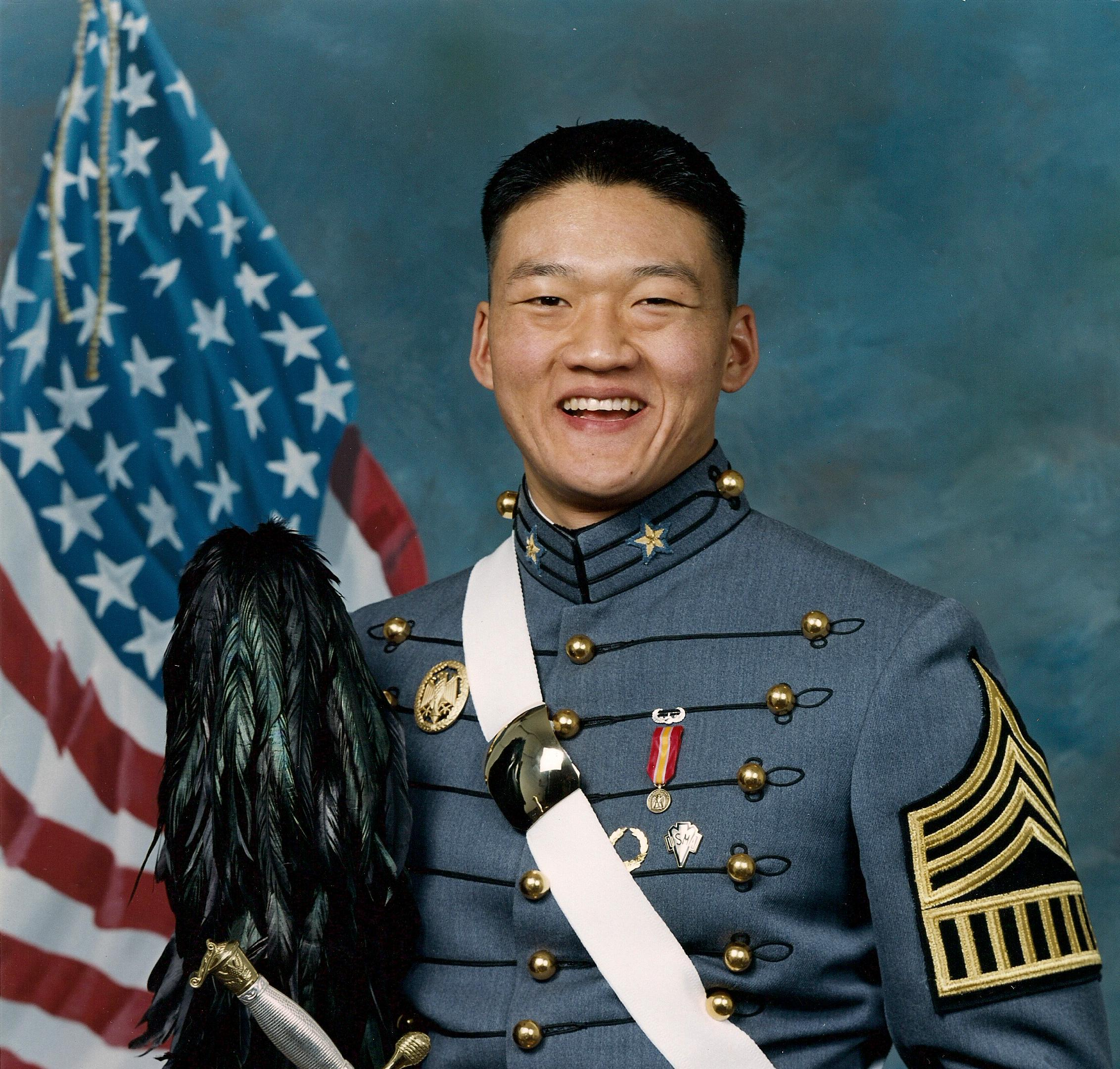
Dan Choi, United States Army veteran and LGBTQ+ advocate

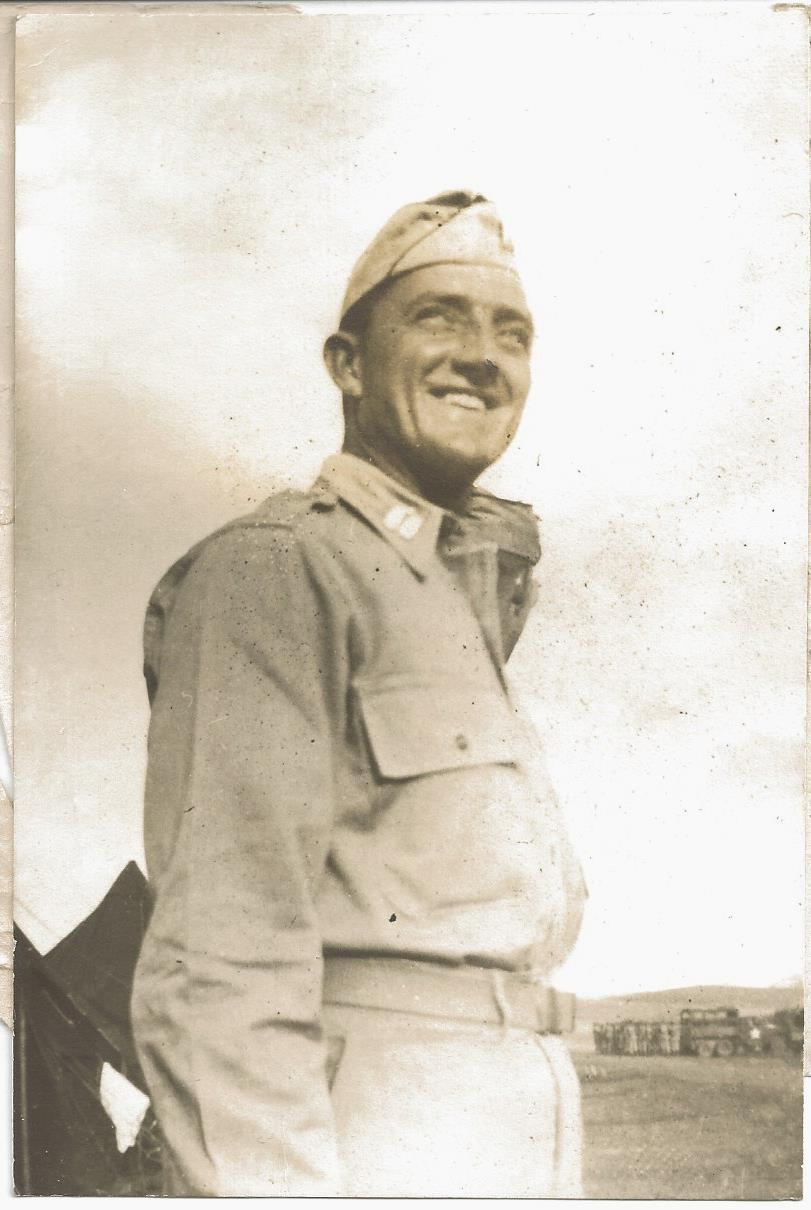
Maj Chester A. Dolan Jr., 83rd President of the Massachusetts Senate

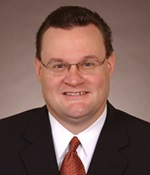
Bradley Jones Jr. (ALB), Minority Leader of the Massachusetts House of Representatives

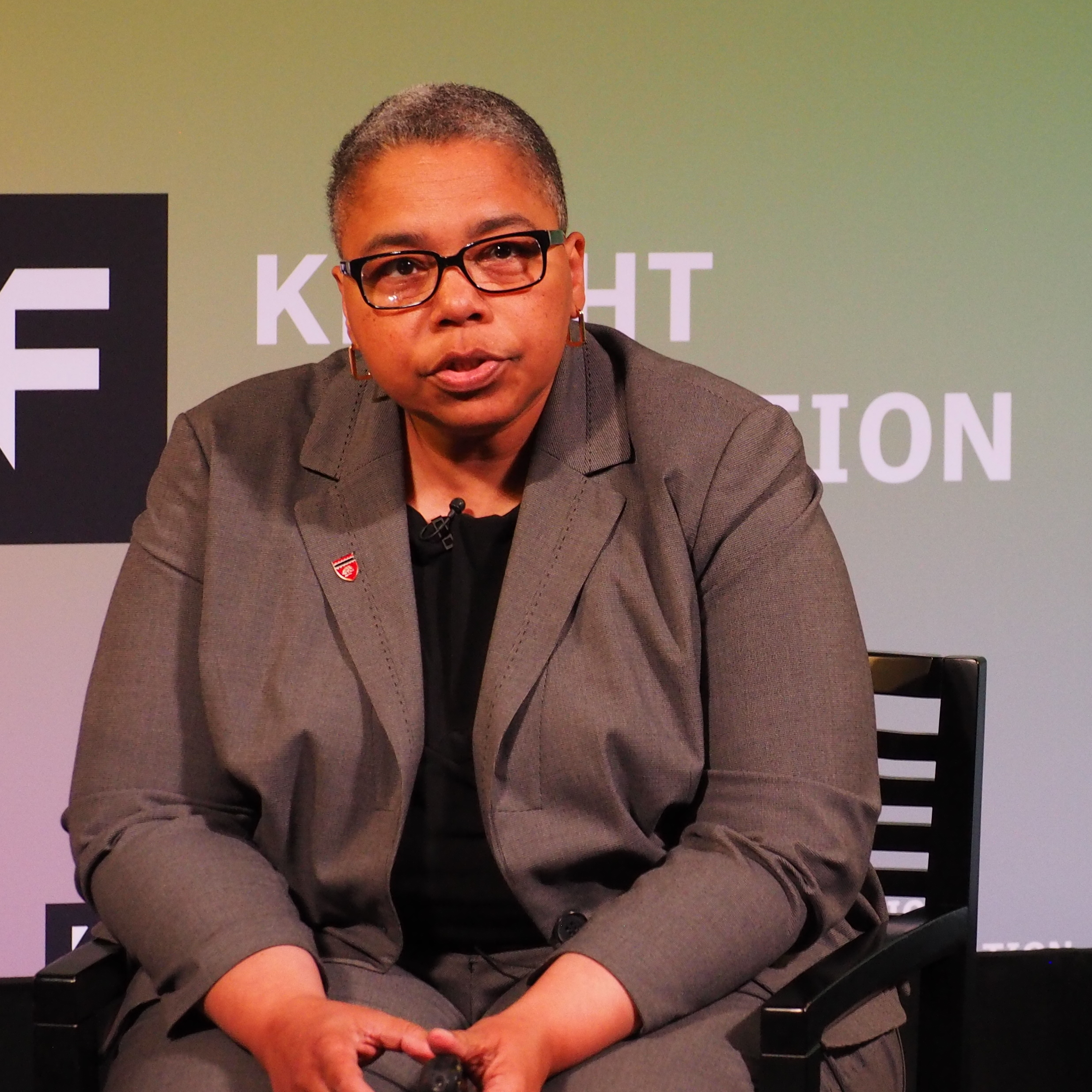
Latanya Sweeney (ALB), Professor at Harvard Kennedy School and Faculty Dean in Currier House

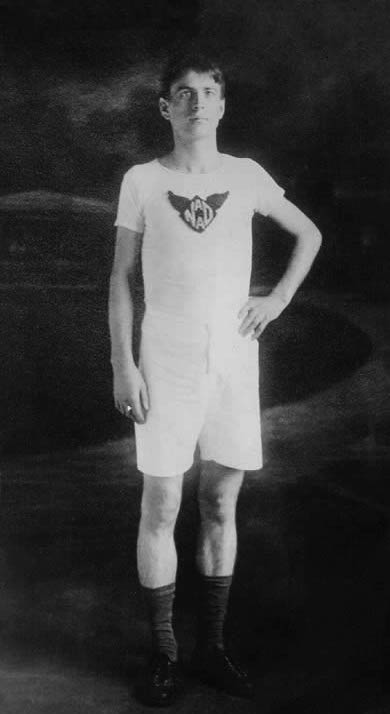
Clarence DeMar (AA), Olympic marathon runner

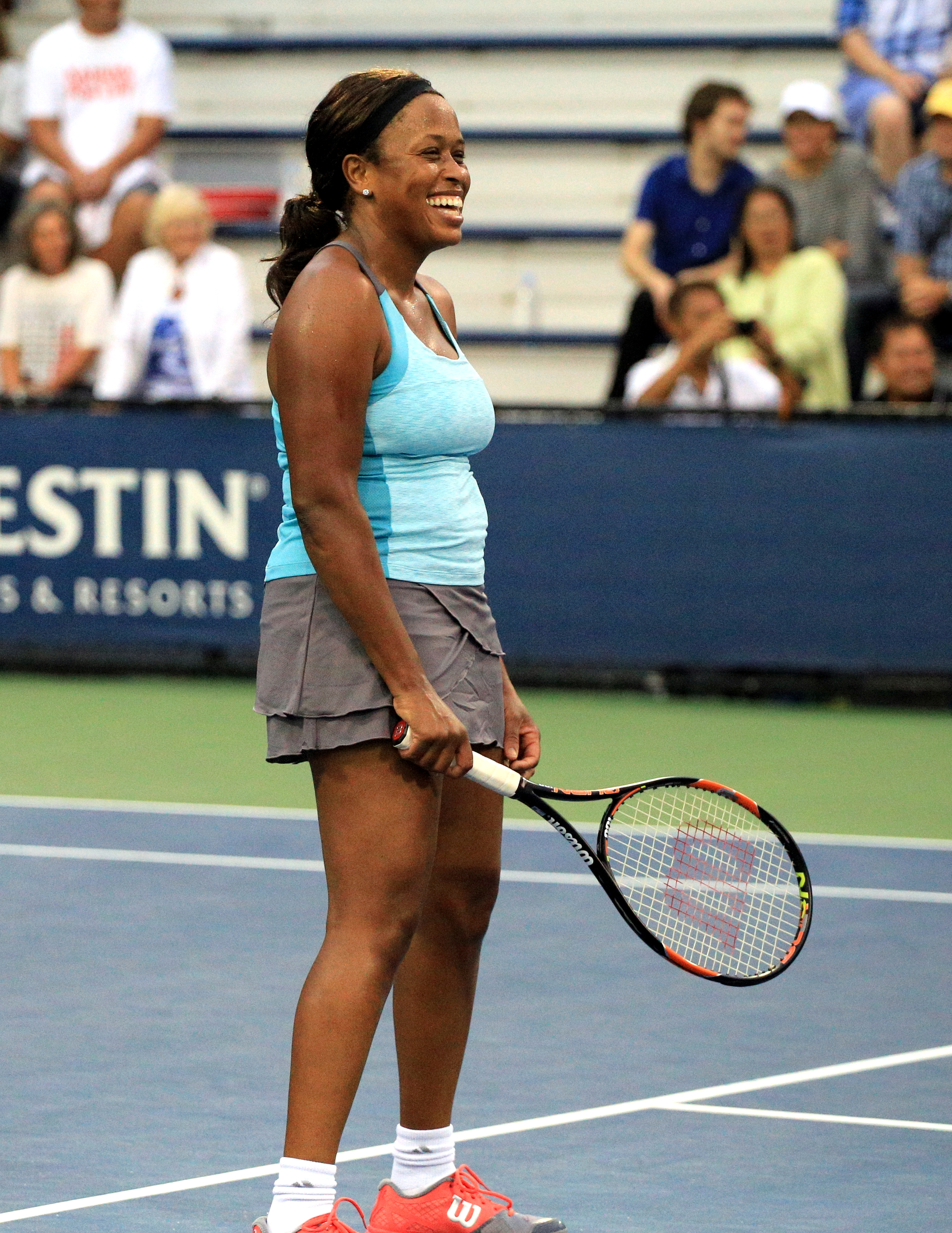
Chanda Rubin (ALB), Professional tennis player

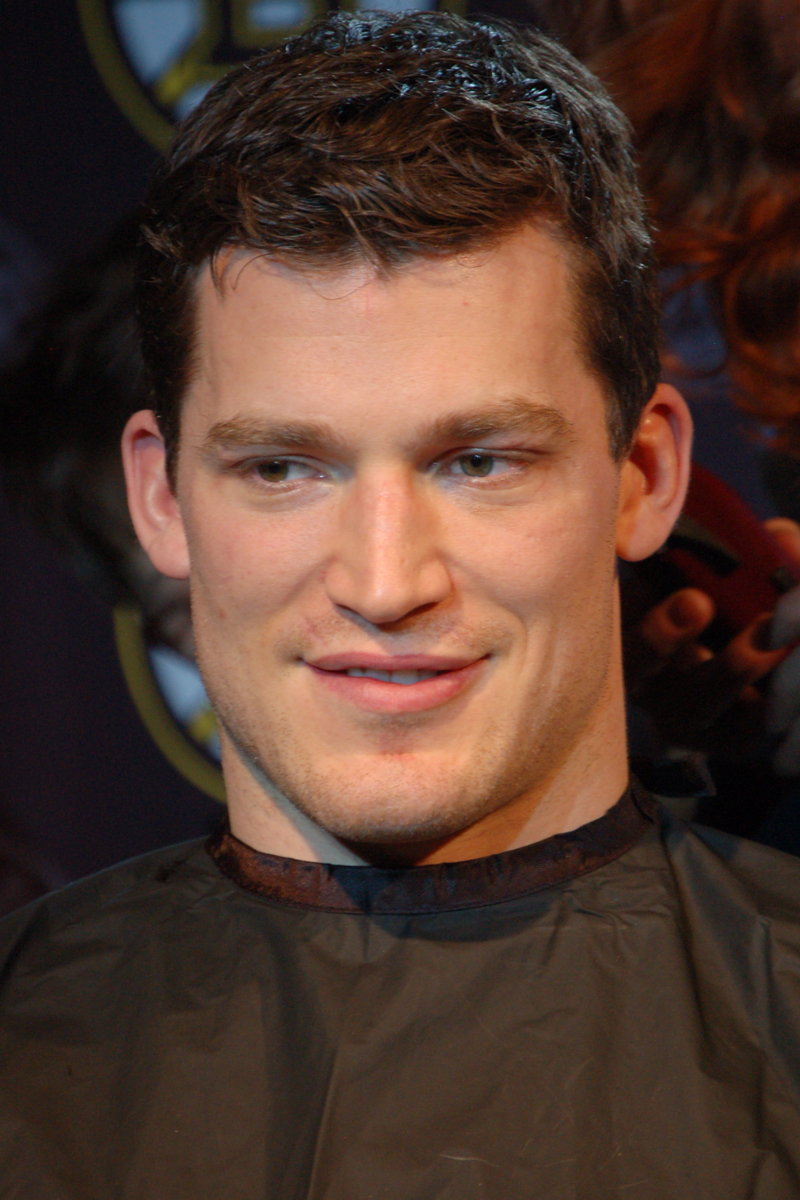
Andrew Ference, (Note: Attended and earned a Professional Graduate Certificate from Harvard Extension School.) professional ice hockey defenseman

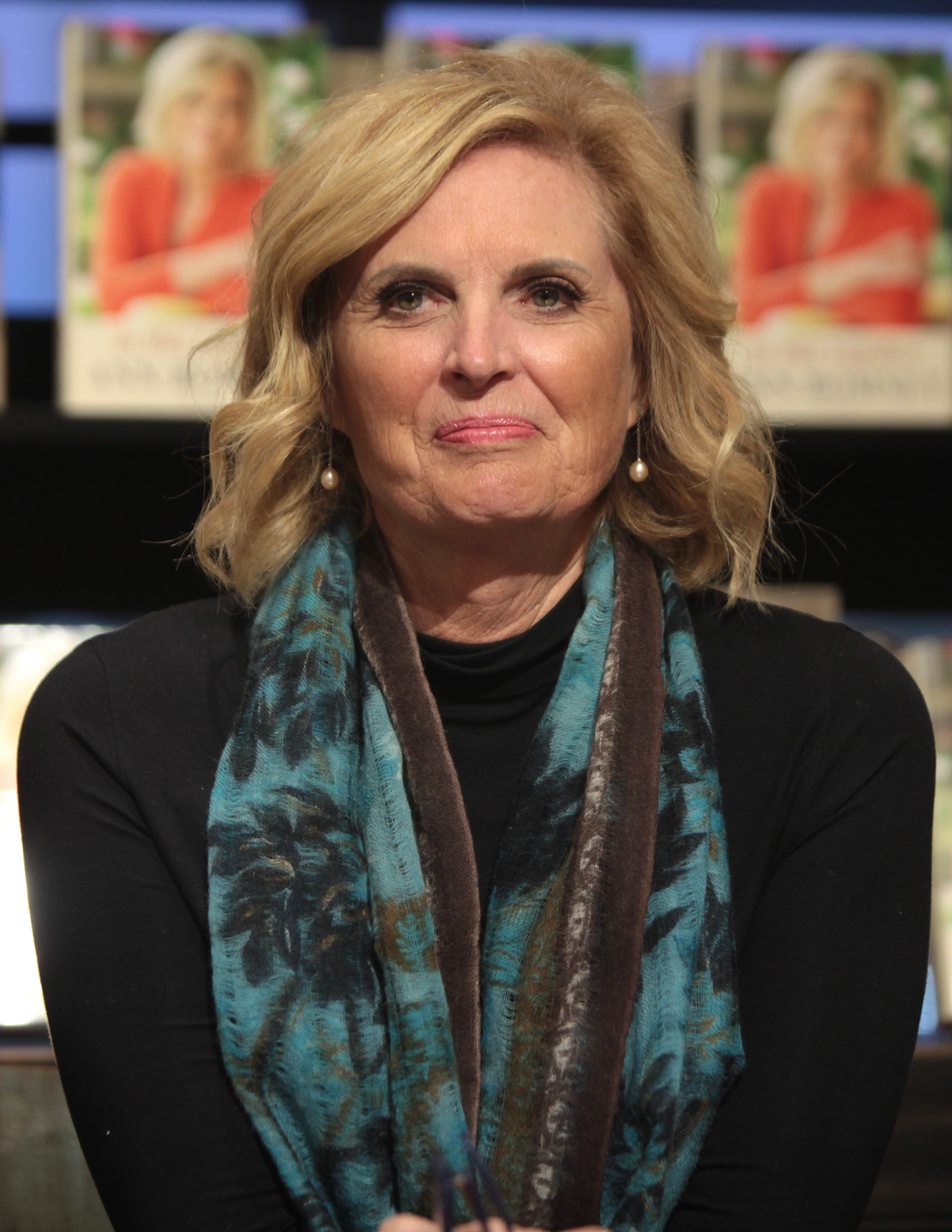
Ann Romney, (Note: Attended, did not graduate.) First Lady of Massachusetts

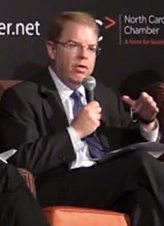
Peter Hans (ALM), 7th President of University of North Carolina system

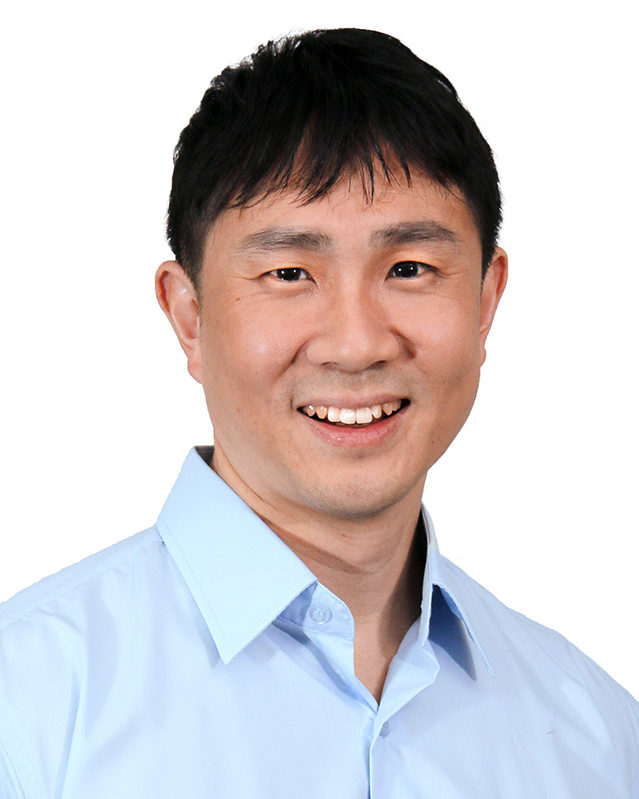
Jamus Lim (ALM 2018), Member of Parliament of Singapore

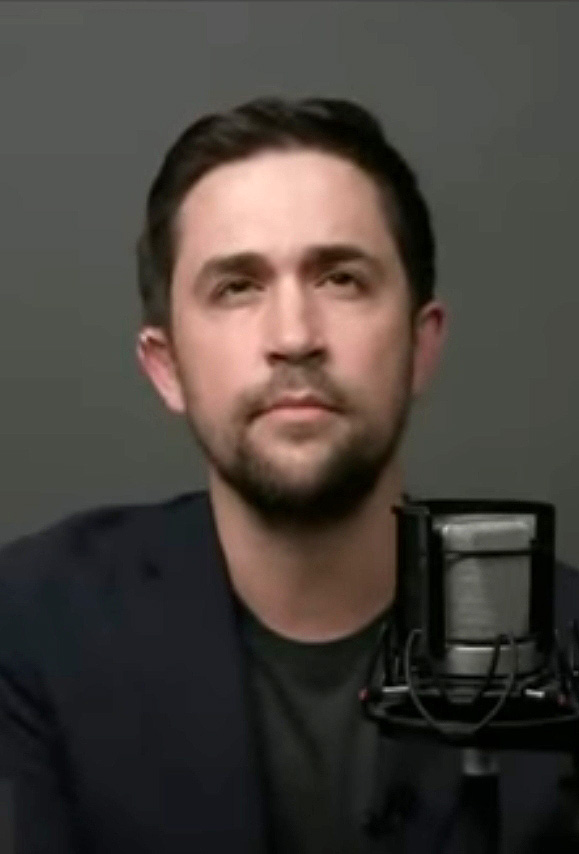
Christopher Rufo (ALM), Activist

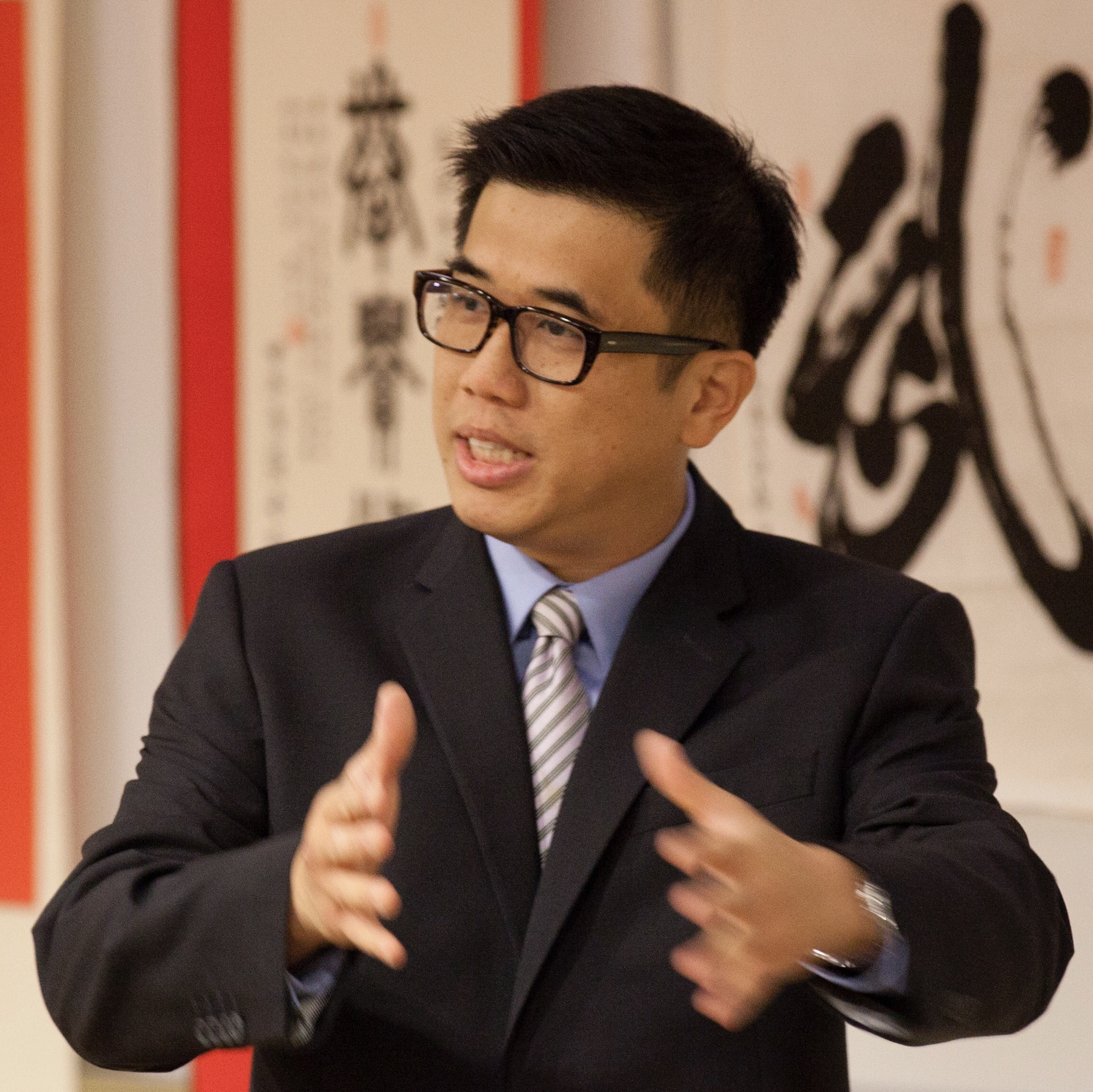
William Kwok (ALM), Chinese-American martial arts educator and community safety advocate

=== Faculty ===
Notable present and past Harvard Extension faculty include:

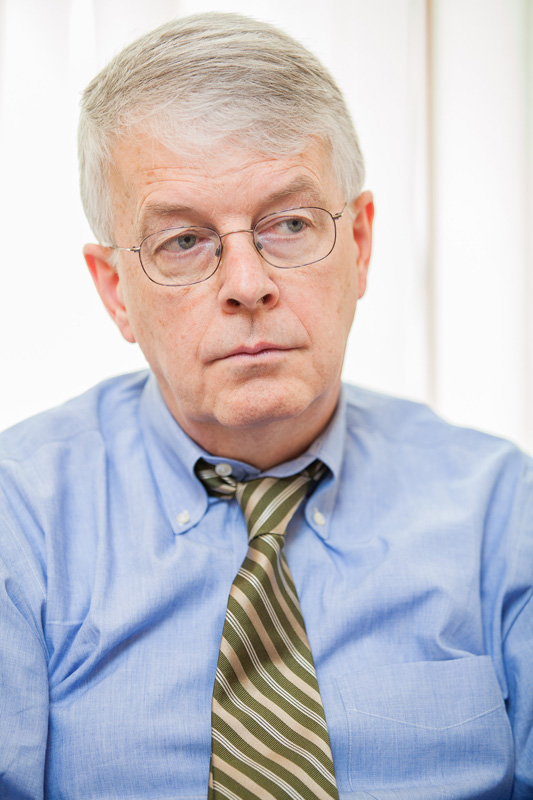
Timothy Colton (Note: Timothy Colton teaches "GOVT" at Harvard Extension School for both undergraduate credit and graduate credit.)

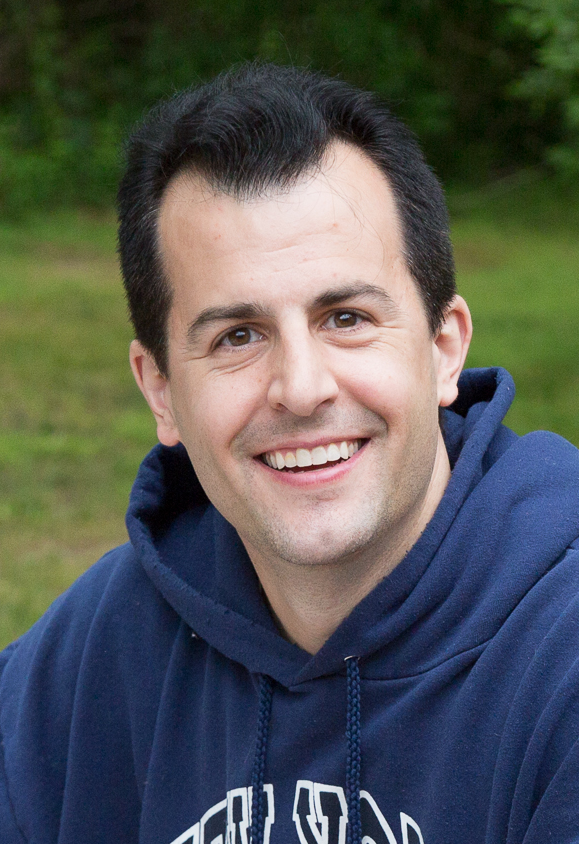
David J. Malan

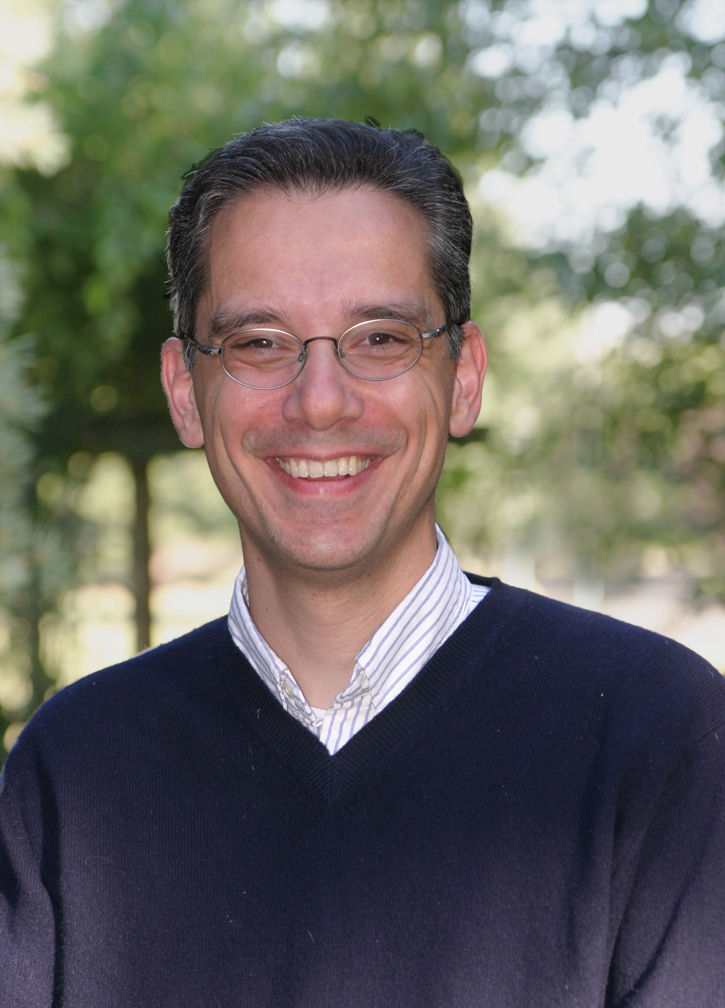
Lee McIntyre

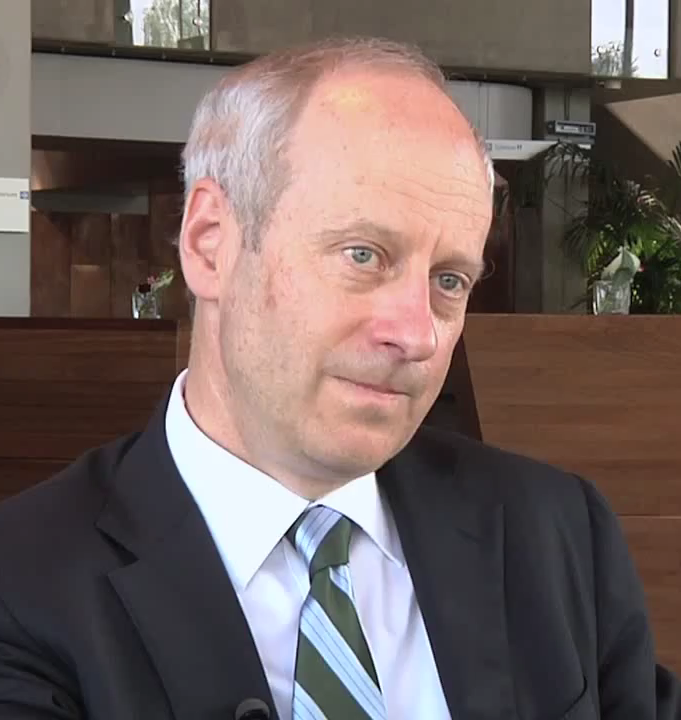
Michael Sandel (Note: Michael Sandel teaches "GOVT E-1035" and "GOVT E-1045" at Harvard Extension School for both undergraduate credit and graduate credit.)

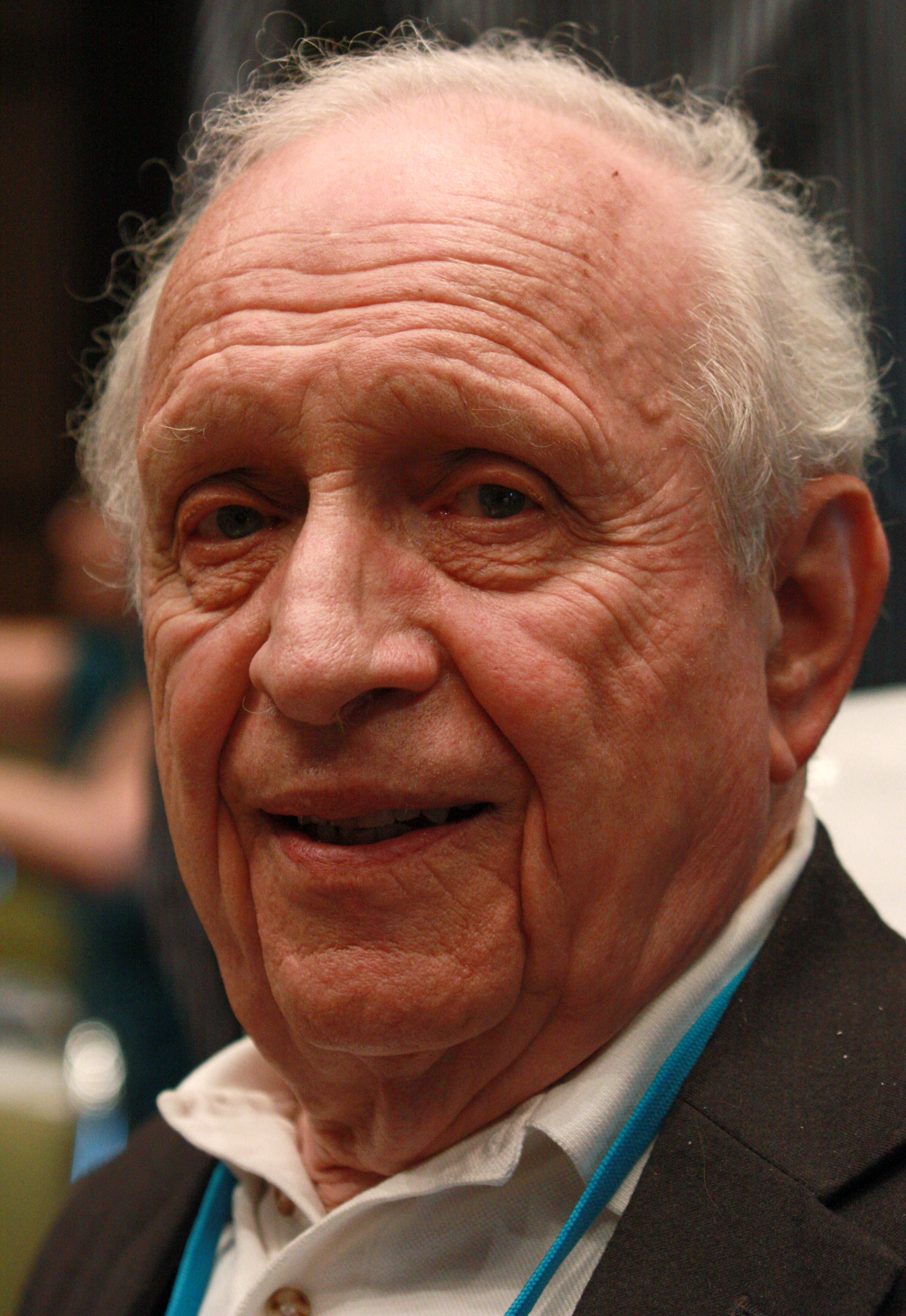
Roy J. Glauber, Recipient of Nobel Prize in Physics in 2005

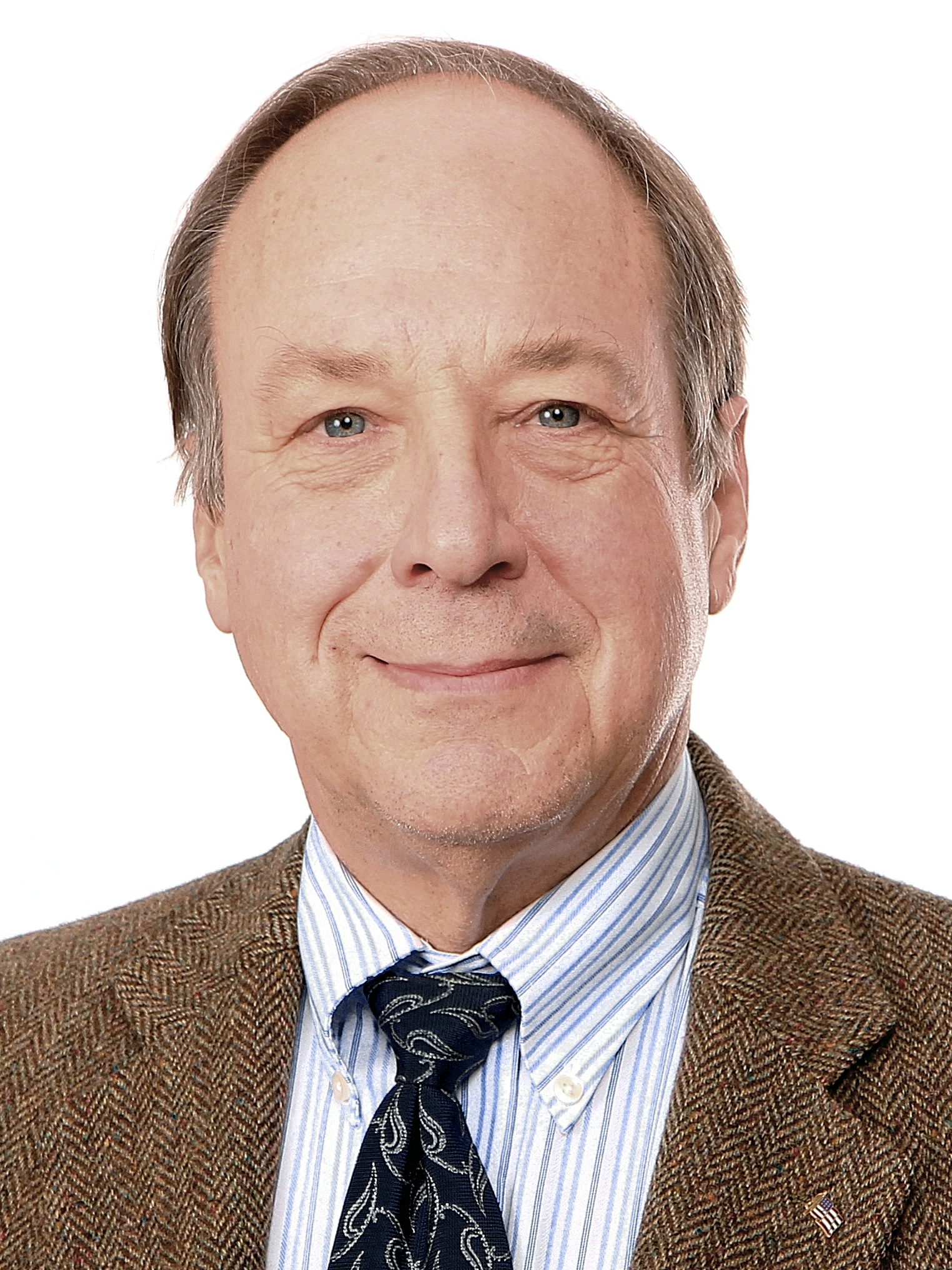
Harry R. Lewis, (Note: Harry Lewis teaches "CSCI E-121" and "CSCI E-20" at Harvard Extension School for both undergraduate credit and graduate credit.) Dean of Harvard College

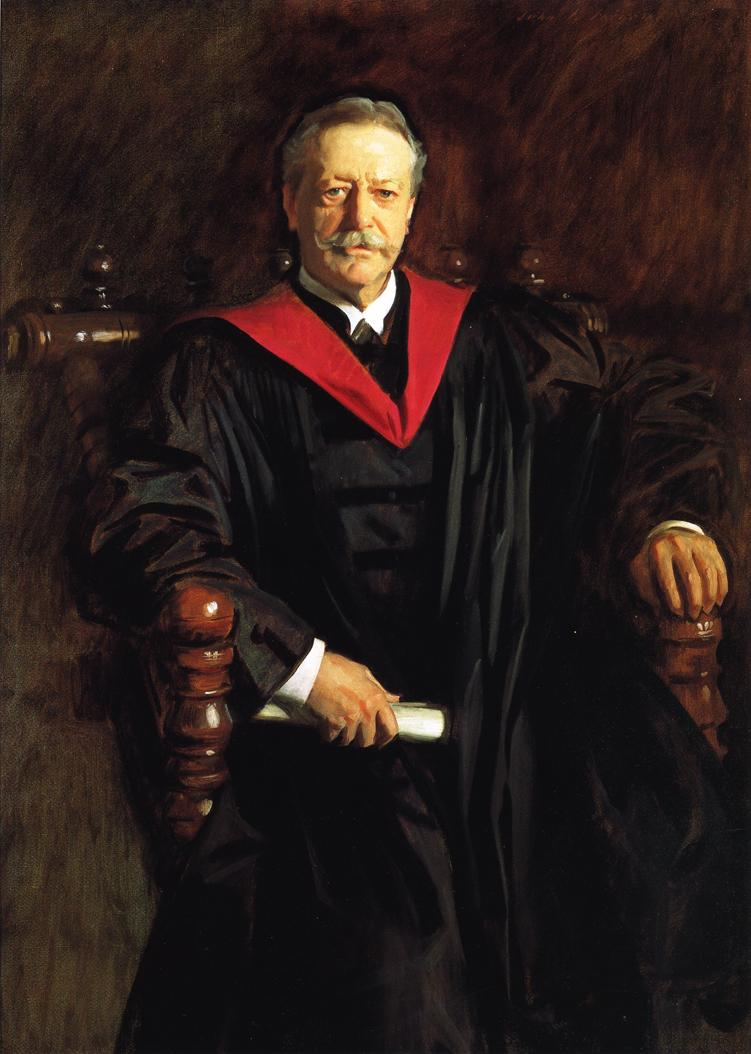
A. Lawrence Lowell, 22nd President of Harvard University

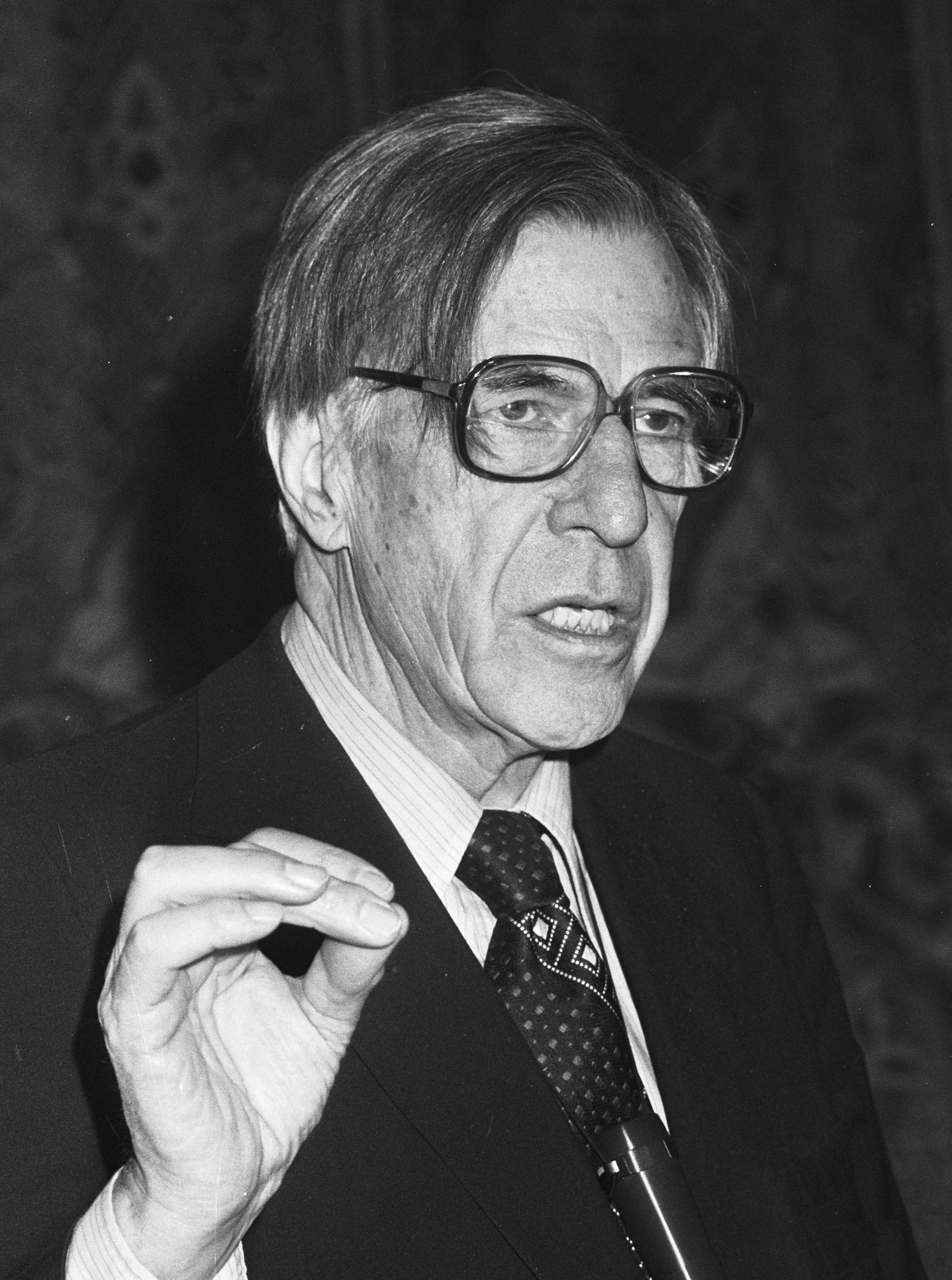
John Kenneth Galbraith

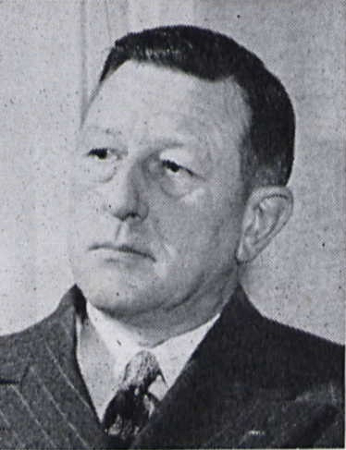
William L. Langer

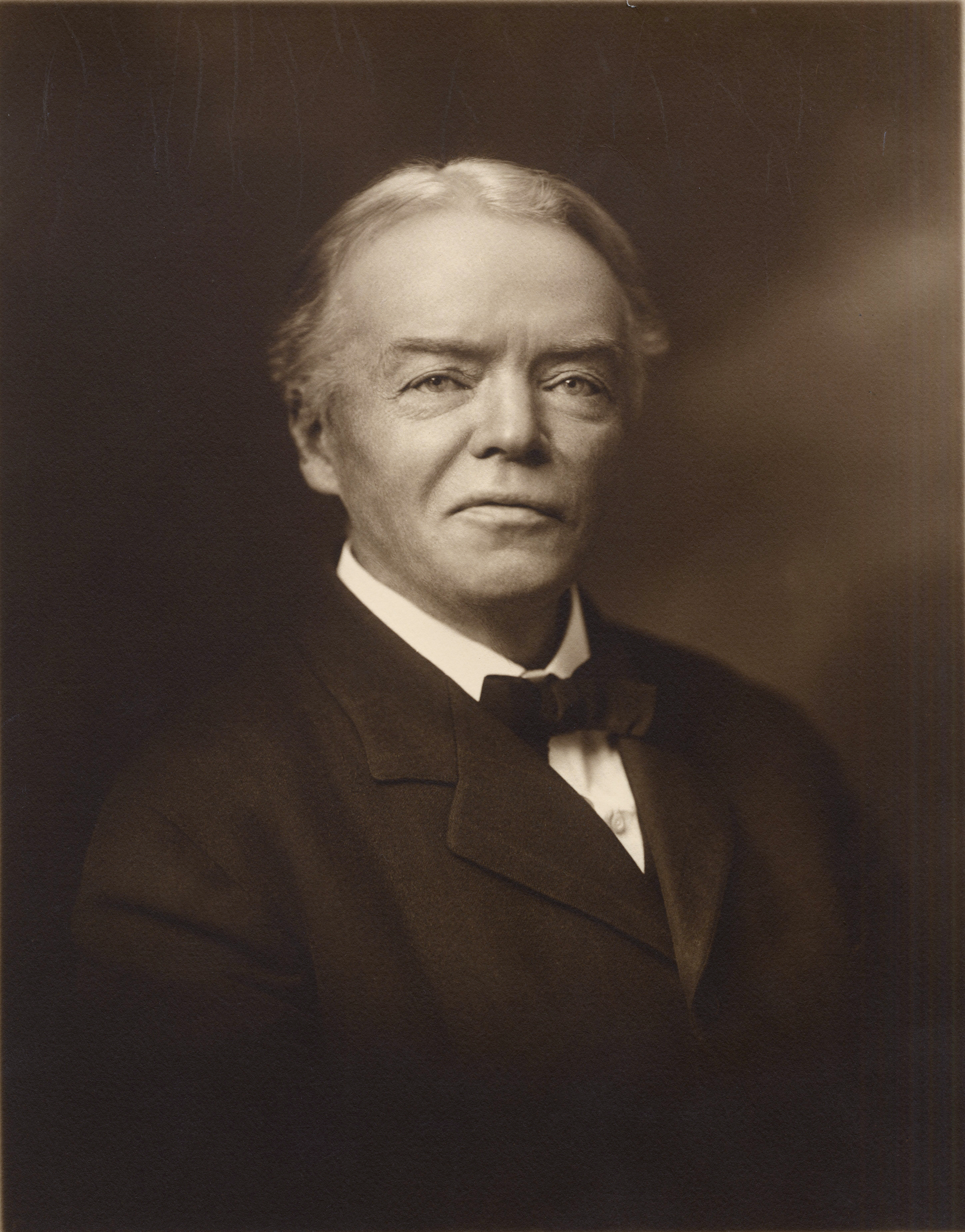
Josiah Royce

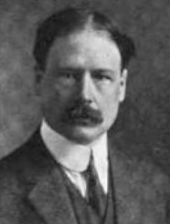
William Hocking
