= Bachelor of Liberal Arts =

Type of undergraduate bachelor's degree

A Bachelor of Liberal Arts (BLA or ALB) is a type of undergraduate bachelor's degree emphasizing broad study across the liberal arts, often providing a flexible curriculum spanning multiple disciplines.

Harvard University confers the degree of "Bachelor of Liberal Arts in Extension Studies" on those who complete Harvard Extension School undergraduate degree programs. The degree can be completed primarily online, with additional on-campus requirements.

In 2022, Georgetown University started to offer the degree program leading a "Bachelor of Liberal Arts" degree for incarcerated personnel at the state-administered Patuxent Institution in Jessup, Maryland, through the Georgetown Prisons and Justice Initiative. The inaugural class had 25 students.
