= Harvard Graduate Council =

Council of students from the twelve Harvard University graduate schools

- Motto: Twelve Harvard Graduate Schools. One Harvard.
- Institution: Harvard University
- Location: Cambridge, Massachusetts
- President: Michael Gee
- Website: hgc.harvard.edu

The Harvard Graduate Council (HGC) (formerly known as the HGSG and originally founded as the HGC) is the centralized student government organization for the twelve graduate schools of Harvard University. Representing the interests of more than 15,000 Harvard graduate students, HGC is responsible for advocating student concerns to university administrators, including the president of Harvard University, as well as the provost and the deans. HGC is also tasked with organizing large university-wide initiatives and events, managing and providing funding for university-wide student groups (USGs), as well as representing the Harvard graduate student population during conferences with other Ivy League universities and external organizations. HGC collaborates with its undergraduate counterpart, the Harvard Undergraduate Council (UC).

The HGC Seal is formed by 13 different Harvard seals. At the center is the main Harvard University seal, which itself is surrounded by the 12 smaller seals of individual graduate schools.

HGC is a steward of the "One Harvard" movement, which aims to bring all of Harvard's graduate schools together through joint advocacy, closer collaboration, and social interaction. Through this movement, HGC organizes university-wide initiatives and events, administers funding for university-wide student groups (USGs), and represents the Harvard graduate student population in relation with other universities and external organizations. HGC is a federal-like student government organization: it consists of representatives from all 12 graduate schools, but each of the twelve schools continues to operate some type of a local student council of its own. These local student councils focus on school-specific issues, whereas HGC's mandate extends to the entire university.

== Governance ==
Membership
All matriculated students of Harvard's twelve graduate and professional schools are members of the HGC:

1. Harvard Business School (HBS)
2. Harvard Divinity School (HDS)
3. Harvard Extension School (HES)
4. Harvard Graduate School of Arts and Sciences (GSAS)
5. Harvard Graduate School of Design (GSD)
6. Harvard Graduate School of Education (HGSE)
7. Harvard Kennedy School of Government (HKS)
8. Harvard Law School (HLS)
9. Harvard Medical School (HMS)
10. Harvard School of Dental Medicine (HSDM)
11. Harvard School of Engineering and Applied Sciences (SEAS)
12. Harvard School of Public Health (HSPH)

Leadership

The governing body of the HGC consists of an executive board, school representatives, and committee representatives. Currently, there are approximately 100 graduate and professional students serving on seven committees and 23 subcommittees within the Leadership Council. Council meetings are held throughout the fall and spring semesters, and are open to all students from Harvard's graduate and professional schools.

The President of the Harvard Graduate Council is Michael Gee (SEAS/GSAS), 2026–2027. The Inaugural President of the Harvard Graduate Council is Beata Zolovska (HMS), 2003–2004. The Inaugural (executive) Vice President is Gene Anthony III (HDS), 2011.

The Executive Board consists of:

- President
- Vice President
- Chair of Operations
- Chair of Finance
- Chair of Information
- Chair of Programming
- Chair of Advocacy

Past Presidents

- Brad Canales (HES), 2025-2026
- Dalton Fogarty (HBS), 2024–2025
- Brett Monson (HES), 2023–2024
- Carlos Gonzalez Sierra (HLS/HKS), 2022–2023
- Peter Choi (HMS), 2021–2022
- Chanthia Ma (HMS), 2020–2021
- Bryan O. Buckley (HSPH), 2019–2020
- Max Vani (GSAS), 2018–2019
- Kevin Tian (SEAS/GSAS), 2017–2018
- Peter Dyrud (GSAS/HKS), 2016–2017
- Mikal R. Mann (HGSE), 2015–2016
- Sudipta "Nila" Devanath (HLS), 2014–2015
- Philip Harding (HKS), 2013–2014
- Scott Chilton (GSAS), 2012–2013
- Joseph Pasqualichio (HBS), 2011–2012
- Pukar Malla (HKS), 2010–2011
- Aaron Chadbourne (HLS/HBS), 2009–2010
- Christopher Laconi (HKS/HBS), 2007–2009
- Cheng Zhu (HGSE), 2006–2007
- John Kalis (HDS), 2005–2006
- Mey Akashah (HSPH), 2004–2005
- Beata Zolovska-Lewis (HMS), 2003–2004

Past Vice Presidents

- Cynthia Alvarado (HGSE), 2025-2026
- Brad Canales (HES), 2024–2025
- Idongesit Sampson (HSPH), 2023–2024
- Mayank Kumar (HDS), 2022–2023
- Himaja Nagireddy (HSPH), 2021–2022
- Joshua Freundel (HLS), 2020–2021
- Chanthia Ma (HMS), 2019–2020
- Daniel Egel-Weiss (HLS), 2018–2019
- Aric Fleming (HDS), 2017–2018
- Simeon Bochev (HBS), 2016–2017
- Dolly Amaya (HGSE), 2015–2016
- Helene Reola (HBS), 2014–2015

The Current Vice President is Robyn Wiseman (HMS), 2026–2027.

Past Chairs of Operations

- Cherise Dunn (HSPS), 2024–2025
- Yuriko Nakamura (HSPH), 2023–2024
- Ulziijargal Sukhbaatar (HGSE)
- Ji Soo Janet Park (HLS)
- Tara Bassi (GSD)
- Himaja Nagireddy (HSPH)
- Esther H. Kim (HKS)
- Tracie Gordon (HES)
- Ornela Gjata
- Alexander Rodriguez

The Current Chair of Operations is Michael Gee (SEAS), 2025–2026.

Past Chairs of Finance

- Cynthia J. Alvarado (HGSE), 2024–2025
- Dalton Fogarty (HBS), 2023–2024
- MJ Mehdi (HES/GSAS)
- Kathleen Dillion (HGSE)
- Brett Monson (HES)
- Jeff Peacock (HKS)
- Kelly Menjivar
- Samual Pun
- Kevin Tian
- Yui Zhang

The Current Chair of Finance is Juan Osbaldo Pastrana Martinez (HES), 2025–2026.

Past Chairs of Information

- Esmeralda Aceituno (GSD), 2023–2025
- Gabriel Omar Pagan Gonzalez (GSAS)
- Nima Shariat Zamanpour (GSD)
- Heidi K. Brandow (GSD)
- Achuth Krishnan "Krish" Sreedevi (HGSE)
- Paul Tylkin (SEAS)
- Akinwande Lalude (HKS)

The Current Chair of Information is Sriya Surapaneni (HMS), 2025–2027.

Past Chairs of Programming

- Rothsethamony Seng (HGSE), 2024–2025
- Aparajita Mridha (HKS), 2023–2024
- Prabhroop Chawla (HDS)
- Shreya Verma (HGSE)
- Estefania Garcia (HES)
- Angela Han (HES)
- Tracie Gordon (HES)
- Matthew Schaeffer
- Payum Noshiravan
- Krishna Rajendren
- Peter Dyrud
- Dolly Amaya

The Current Chair of Programming is Talia Patt (HGSE), 2025–2026.

Past Chairs of Advocacy

- Curneisha Williams (HGSE), 2023–2024
- Janan Iranbomy (HKS)
- Xavier Sayeed (HDS)
- Abhinaya Narayanan (HKS)
- Jasmin Frankel (HES)
- Tre Tennyson (HGSE)
- Dana Rassas
- Natalie Yang
- Tara Mayo
- Nick Zhenner

The Current Chairs of Advocacy are Victor Lee (HGSE), 2024–2027, and Hadi Fareed (HGSE), 2025–2026.

== Operations ==
University administrators often consult with the HGC on a variety of issues facing Harvard graduate students. HGC leadership also serves on various faculty-administrator-student committees and task forces, focusing on issues such as the student health care, campus planning, Harvard presidential appointments, and sexual assault.

== University-wide Student Groups (USG) ==
The Harvard Graduate Council (HGC) provides operational and event grant funding for recognized university-wide student organizations through the University-wide Student Groups Sub-Committee of the HGC Finance Committee.

2026–2027 USGs

- Arab Student Association
- Argentine Student Society
- Asian Pacific Coalition
- Augmented and Virtual Reality Student Alliance
- Black Graduate Student Alliance
- Chinese Students and Scholars Association
- Colombian Student Society
- Ecuadorian Student Association
- Effective Altruism Student Group
- India Student Group
- Italian Students Society
- Latino Student Alliance
- Mexican Association of Students
- Pakistan Student Group
- Association of Peruvian Students
- Vegan Society Student Group

== Events ==
HGC organizes university-wide events, including the Harvard-wide Welcome Back Event, the Harvard Masquerade Ball, Harvard Leadership Conference, Lectures That Last, and Post.Harvard.
