= Reginald H. Phelps =

Reginald Henry Phelps (August 20, 1909 – September 28, 2006) was the Chairman of Commission on Extension Courses and Director of the University Extension at Harvard University from 1949 to 1975. He was the fourth person to hold the position. He graduated from Harvard University (A.B. summa cum laude in 1930, A.M. in 1933, and Ph.D. in 1947).

Academic offices
Preceded by George W. Adams	Dean of the Harvard Extension School; 1949-1975	Succeeded by Michael Shinagel
