= Harvard Undergraduate Council =

Student government of Harvard College

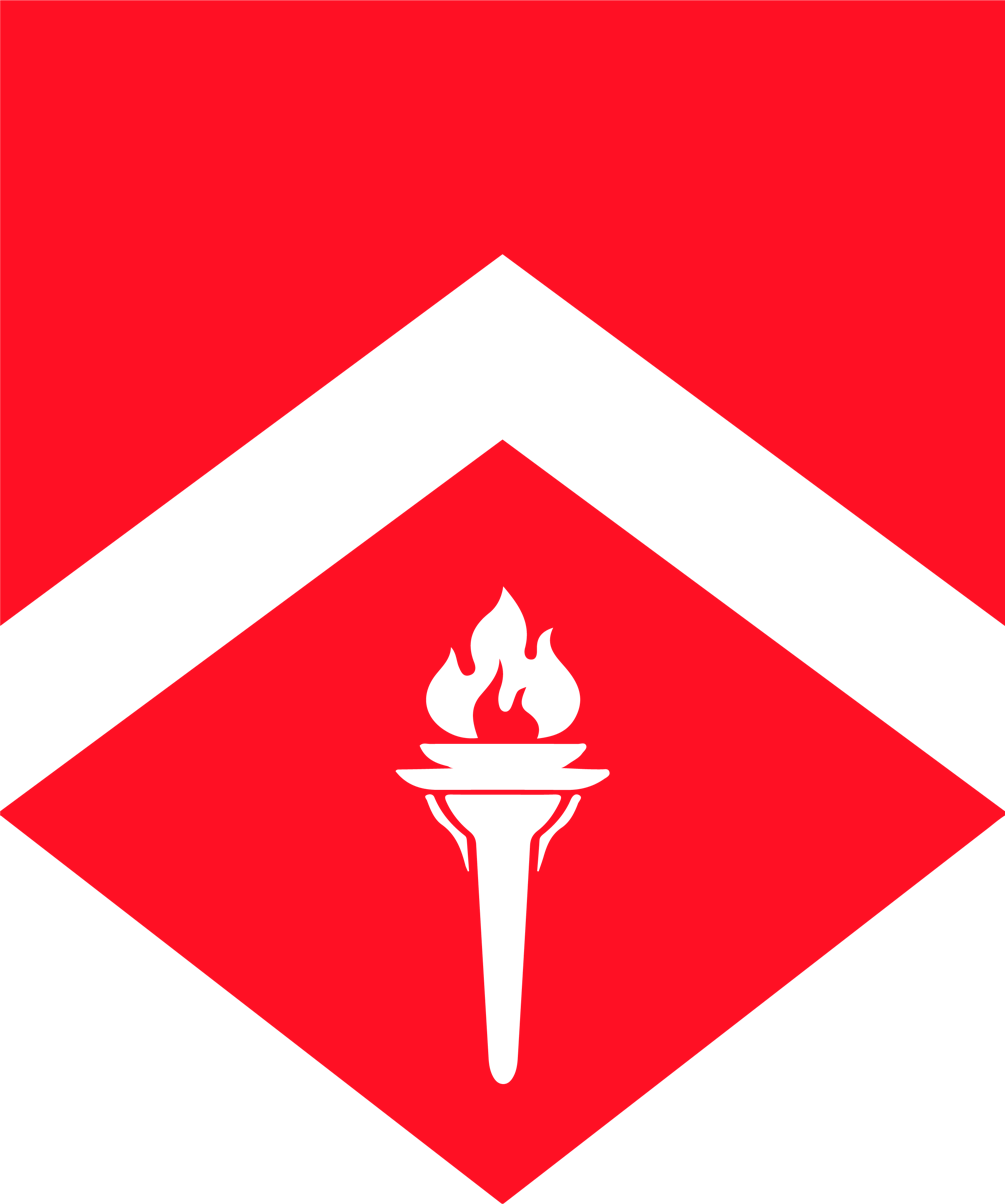
The logo of the Undergraduate Council.

The Harvard Undergraduate Council, Inc., colloquially known as "The UC," was the student government of Harvard College between 1982 and 2022, until it was abolished by a student referendum.

In 2019, students called the UC "out of touch from reality" and launched a popular movement to "dissolve the UC." The Harvard Independent declared that the UC was "known to spend a huge budget to accomplish nothing (except a line on a resumé)." The Harvard Crimson's editorial board characterized the UC as "a dysfunctional, detached government...unpopular enough to spark massive support for its abolition.

The UC was criticized for grant funding delays, internal procedural debates, funding disparities between student organizations, political infighting, and bureaucratic inefficiencies. In the late 2010s, voter turnout in UC elections was as low as 2 percent, and a Winter 2021 Harvard Political Review poll found that only 9 percent of Harvard undergraduates approved of the UC.

On March 31, 2022, Harvard undergraduates voted to dissolve the UC by a 76 percent to 24 percent margin.

== History ==
=== Early years ===
In the year 1980, the Dean of Harvard College John B. Fox initiated a committee that was to be called the Committee to Review College Governance, chaired by John Dowling, who was a professor of biology at the College. This committee was tasked with the duty of determining the strengths and the weaknesses of the present system of governance at the College and considering any needed reforms that might improve the quality of college life at Harvard.

This committee's deliberations eventually led to the passage of legislation from the faculty, a bill which was created the Harvard-Radcliffe Undergraduate Council in 1982. The constitution of the Council was ratified by a student body referendum in the same year. The first Council had roughly 80 members, and these members would elect a chair and a vice-chair to oversee the Council. The Undergraduate Council funded undergraduate organizations with the proceeds of an opt-out fee collected from the tuition bill of each registered student, planned social events and services, and sent representatives to student-faculty committees.

In 1993, Carey Gabay, who said he wanted to pursue a "dynamic and grassroots path toward council leadership," was elected as the Undergraduate Council's first Black president. In 1995, future U.S. Representative Randy Fine was chair of the Council student affairs committee. In 1999, Fentrice Driskell was elected as the Undergraduate Council's first Black female president. In 2001, Sujean Lee was elected as the Undergraduate Council's first Asian-American president. Lee's victory as Harvard student body president sparked international media attention, as 20 of South Korea's top broadcasting companies and newspapers covered her win. In 2002, in a symbolic gesture to honor the advancement of gender relations on campus since the integration of Harvard and Radcliffe Colleges, the Council voted to strike "Radcliffe" from its name to simply become the "Harvard Undergraduate Council". Throughout the 2000s, the UC's elections drew relatively high voter turnout (in excess of 50 percent), and the UC was given credit for practical campus life improvements, such as moving final exams to occur before winter break and 24-hour library access.

=== Emerging disillusionment and attempts at reform (late 2010s) ===
By the late 2010s, Harvard students expressed widespread dissatisfaction with the UC and voter turnout in UC elections frequently dipped below 10 percent. In October 2019, Harvard students launched a movement to "Dissolve the UC." In November 2019, a presidential ticket that promised to "Abolish the UC" won the most first-choice votes, but lost by 0.8 percent in the final Borda count tally of weighted votes.

In March 2020, after the coronavirus pandemic forced Harvard undergraduates to leave campus, the UC advocated for Harvard to adopt a "Double A" model ensuring a grade of A or A− for all students (with no failing grade) and then pivoted to calling for a "Universal pass system that preferably treats a Pass as a '4.0' for GPA purposes," sparking widespread ridicule. Ultimately, Harvard's administration ignored the UC's recommendations and adopted a universal pass/fail system.

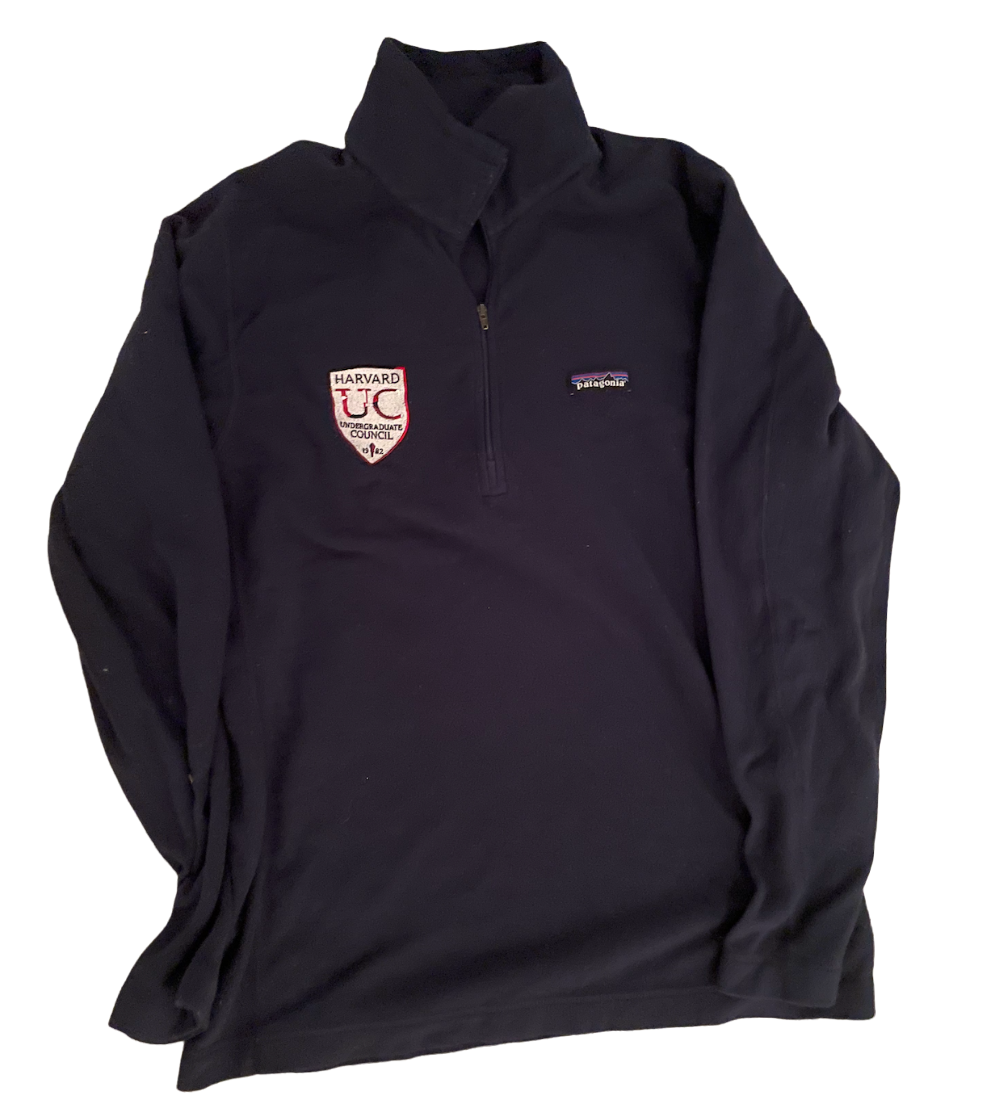
During the late 2010s, one notable controversy occurred when the Undergraduate Council used funding from a student grant for diversity, harassment prevention, and mental health initiatives to purchase council Patagonia sweaters. "UC Patagonias" became an infamous token of the Undergraduate Council's excesses leading up to the council's abolition.

Harvard students frequently satirized the UC on social media as an "impotent body made up of slick wannabe politicians" and joked about the UC's lack of legitimacy. The Harvard Crimson's editorial board criticized the UC for "debating parliamentary issues" instead of improving student life. Some Harvard students even launched a presidential run claiming that the UC had committed tax fraud.

In 2019, the Undergraduate Council passed a package of reforms that modified the structure of standing committees and created a new communications team. In April 2020, the Undergraduate Council launched a plan to interact and engage more with the student body after taking a survey of the student body.

=== Abolition of the Undergraduate Council (2021-22) ===
Nevertheless, the Undergraduate Council continued to suffer from widespread distrust and disillusionment. In fall 2020, Harvard students launched a campaign encouraging students to waive the $200 fee that funded the UC's activities. On November 13, 2021, Harvard undergraduates elected a presidential ticket that promised to "Defund the UC." A Winter 2022 Harvard Political Review poll found that the Undergraduate Council had a 9 percent approval rating. Harvard students organized to abolish the UC by distributing the treatise "On Representative Student Government" by "John Harvard."

On March 31, 2022, the student body voted to dissolve the UC and replace it with a new student government by a margin of 76 percent to 24 percent. 57 percent of undergraduates turned out to vote despite the attempts of some UC proponents to boycott the election. Supporters of abolishing the Undergraduate Council coalesced around the slogan "Vote Yes for Change," while opponents launched the Know Your Vote movement and claimed that dissolving the UC would decrease student representation and undermine Harvard's diversity. After the vote, controversy emerged over uncertainties regarding club funding and conflicting communications from council members. A transition meeting was held on April 4 of council members and club leaders to establish interim funding procedures and program continuations.

On April 5, 2022, every Harvard undergraduate received $10 from a sum of $125,325.44 that had been withheld from the UC while it was being audited by Risk Management and Audit Services. On April 11, 2022, Risk Management and Audit Services released the results of its financial and operational audit of the UC in a 17-page report. The audit concluded that "the system of internal control at the UC is inadequate" because "one individual has control over disbursing funds," the UC "does not use software for budgeting, accounting, and financial reporting," and "spending is not tracked against the budget." The auditors found that the UC spent $2,190 on Patagonia sweaters, spent $6,758 on a Sunapee, NH members retreat, and made a contribution of $21,570 to the Black Lives Matter movement "without DSO approval," answering longstanding student questions about the UC's financial management.

The replacement organization, the Harvard Undergraduate Association, intended to address many of the alleged problems of the prior organization, such as a widespread lack of confidence in the Undergraduate Council, allegations of Undergraduate Council financial mismanagement, and the Undergraduate Council's existing representation plan. This new body included fewer elected representatives and solicited undergraduate volunteers to join one of the organization's issue-focused teams. By its fourth year, the Harvard Undergraduate Association's approval rating stood at 39 percent (against 33 percent disapproval), a marked improvement over the 9 percent approval rating that the Undergraduate Council attained one week before it was abolished.

The fall of the Undergraduate Council sparked widespread campus discussions, ranging from the serious to the satirical. Campus administrators, such as Dean of Harvard College Rakesh Khurana, frequently commented on the fall of the UC. The Harvard Crimson's magazine satirically compared the abolition of the UC to the fall of the Soviet Union.

The Undergraduate Council was indirectly satirized in an original play, written by Chinyere Obasi, called Under Control/Utter Chaos which ran at the end of November and beginning of December 2023.

== Operations ==
Founded with the purpose of representing undergraduates at Harvard to the administration, faculty, and wider community, the Undergraduate Council was responsible for advocacy on behalf of students and funding student activities on campus. The Council operated with a budget that was, ostensibly, primarily dispensed to student organizations; in years of proper financial dispensation, it would also fund social events and student initiatives. The vast majority of the UC's funding came from the composite of $200 fees collected from the tuition bill of each student.

The council was responsible for the administration of student services, campus-wide events, and student advocacy at Harvard. There were 54 undergraduate students at any given time serving on the Council: a president, vice president, 3 from each of the 12 residential houses and 5 freshman districts, and one from the Dudley Community.

Administrators at the College often consulted with the council to discuss student issues, and former UC leaders advocated for increased student input on higher-level administrative decisions. The Undergraduate Council would field applications from the student body for places in student-faculty committees that brought administrators and students together to discuss campus issues.

The UC also formerly interfaced with its graduate counterpart, the Harvard Graduate Council.
