= Huntington D. Lambert =

Hunt Lambert
- Born: Huntington D. "Hunt" Lambert
- Occupations: Dean of the Division of Continuing Education and University Extension at Harvard University
- Spouse: Kelly

Academic background
- Education: Colorado College; Massachusetts Institute of Technology
- Website: Meet the Dean

Huntington D. Lambert served as the dean of the Division of Continuing Education and University Extension at Harvard University. He was the sixth person to hold the position, having been appointed in 2013. He retired on December 31, 2019.

== Personal life ==
Lambert was "massively dyslexic" and could not read at 10 years old, although he could break down and reassemble a car. He grew up in Dover, Massachusetts, and his mother, Joan, graduated from the Extension School. Lambert said he resented his mother as a child for leaving at night to attend classes, but later understood the scope of her accomplishment. Joan only attended the graduation ceremony, however, after her son became the dean.

He has a bachelor's degree from Colorado College and a master's of science in management degree from the MIT Sloan School of Management. He met his wife, Kelly, while an undergraduate.

== Professional life ==
Before becoming an academic, Lambert worked in the telecommunications industry. It was there that "he experienced the impact that technology and interconnectivity was having on people and the world around them."

Lambert also led the Division of Continuing Education at Colorado State University where he created the Colorado State University Global Campus, an all-online public university. As part of the creation, Lambert developed the strategy, business plan, and operations plan for the Global Campus, and was involved in every aspect of the planning, strategy, board approvals, startup, legal approvals, and independent accreditation. Also at Colorado State, Lambert founded the Center for Entrepreneurship and its Community and Economic Development Office. While there, he was involved with the spin out of 15 companies from the university research labs, including Envirofit.org and Solix Biofuels. He taught, both in person and online, in CSU's M.B.A. program.

His goal as dean of the Harvard Extension School was "to ensure that high-quality education is available at a fair price to the 20 million Americans who need better education to participate in a knowledge economy." During his six-year tenure, programs nearly doubled with more than 30,000 unique learners every year.

Academic offices
Preceded by Michael Shinagel	Dean of the Harvard Extension School; 2013 - 2019	Succeeded by Nancy J. Coleman
