= Mysteries of the Bible =

A&E television series (1990s)

- Narrated by: Jean Simmons; Richard Kiley
- Country of origin: United States
- No. of seasons: 5
- No. of episodes: 45

Production
- Running time: 45 minutes

Original release
- Network: A&E; National Geographic Channel (Greece)
- Release: March 25, 1994 – June 13, 1998

Mysteries of the Bible is an hour-long television series that was originally broadcast by A&E from March 25, 1994, until June 13, 1998, and A&E aired reruns of it until 2002. The series was about biblical mysteries and was produced by FilmRoos. The Discovery Channel and BBC also released a series of the same name in 2003.

== List of episodes ==
=== Pilot ===
Title	Original Airdate	Chapters/ Acts	Interviews	Biblical & Extra Biblical Verses	NOTES
#1 "Pilot - Part 1 of 2"	January 1994	1. The Good Book 2.The Dead Sea Scrolls 3.The Lost Ark Of The Covenant 4.Mysteries Of The Holy Ark 5.The Mysteries Continue	Interviews with Hershel Shanks, Lawrence Schiffman, Daniel L. Smith-Christopher, Dr. Michael Wise, Dr. James Sanders, Dr. Carol Meyers, Dr. Menachem Haran, Michael Hiltzik	Book of Revelation 7:2-3, Book of Leviticus 19:13, Gospel of John 8:7, Book of Exodus, 3:4, 3:8, 25:10, Gospel of Matthew 2: , Book of Genesis 4:9, 22:2, 1:1, Josephus Antiquities of the Jews, Gospel of Luke 1:23, Deuteronomy 4:40, Book of Zechariah 14:12, 1 Books of Kings 11:1, 3:23, 10:2, 11:1, 10:13, 1 Book of Samuel 17:33, Book of Isaiah 2:4	
#2 "Pilot - Part 2 of 2"	January 1994	1. Dead Sea Scrolls 2.Who Was Jesus? 3.Who Killed Christ?			

=== Season 1 ===
Title	Original Airdate	Chapters/ Acts	Interviews	Biblical & Extra Biblical Verses	NOTES
#1 "Moses at Mt. Sinai"	March 25, 1994	1. Road To Redemption 2.; Let My People Go 3. Into The Wilderness 4. The Mystery Of The Mountain And The Golden Calf 5. The Promised Land	Interviews with Dr. Carol Meyers, William G. Dever, Daniel L. Smith-Christopher, Rabbi David Wolpe, Dr. J. Andrew Dearman, Lawrence Schiffman	Book of Exodus 20:2, 2:11, 3:4, 4:10, 7:10, 7:17, 12:13, 12:37, 14:21, 14:28, 19:2, 19:5, 31:7, Book of Numbers 20:5, 20:7, 27:12, Book of Deuteronomy 34:5	
#2 "Jesus in the Galilee"	April 1, 1994	1. The Road To Galilee 2.A Boat Out Of Time 3.The Ministry Begins 4.The Silence of Sepphoris 5.Majesty In The High Places	Interviews with Dr. John Dominic Crossan, Dr. Andrew Overman, Dr. Shelley Wachsmann, Eric M. Meyers, S. Scott Bartchy, Michael L. Cook, Dr. Jonathan Reed,	Gospel of Mark 1:9, 4:31, 9:2, 10:35, 12:15, 16:2, Gospel of Luke 2:1, 2:6, 4:28, 8:22, Gospel of Thomas 1:13, Gospel of John 2:6, 21:3, Gospel of Matthew 5:3, 5:6, 5:9	
#3 "Joshua at the Wall of Jericho"	April 8, 1994	1. The Promised Land 2. Joshua's Conquest 3. The Silent Walls of Jericho 4. When the Sun Stood Still 5. Joshua's Final Calling	Interviews with William Dever, Dr. Bryant G. Wood, Daniel L. Smith-Christopher, Rabbi David Wolpe, Dr. Norman K. Gottwald, and Dr. Ziony Zevit.	Book of Deuteronomy 3:27, 20:16, Book of Joshua 1:7, 2:15, 3:7, 6:13, 7:3, 7:10, 8:1, 8:28-29, 10:12, 11:10, 23:6	NOTE: Features Archival Footage of Kathleen Kenyon and Yigael Yadin.
#4 "Cities of Evil: Sodom and Gomorrah"	April 15, 1994	1. In Search Of Ten Good Men 2. Fire And Brimstone 3. A Pillar Of Salt 4. Two Lost Cities 5. A Timeless Lesson Of Immortality	Interviews with Daniel L. Smith-Christopher, Rabbi David Wolpe, Dr. R. Thomas Schaub, Dr. Walter Rast, Dr. Donald J. Ortner, Michael Coogan	Book of Genesis 19:23, 13:12, 18:20, 18:23, 19:1, 18:2, 19:15, 20:16, 19:30, 19:27	
#5 "Masada—The Last Fortress"	April 22, 1994	1. Palace On The Mountaintop 2. Revolt In The Wilderness 3. The Warrior Archaeologist 4. One Voice For Dead 5. A Question Of Suicide	Interviews with Walter Zanger, Dr. Lawrence Schiffman, S. Scott Bartchy, Dr. Eric M. Meyers, Dr. Shaye J.D. Cohen	1 Book of Samuel 23:14, Josephus The Jewish War Book 2, 3, 7, & 8, Josephus Antiquities of the Jews Book 15	NOTE: Features Archival Footage of Yigael Yadin.
#6 "Jesus: Holy Child"	April 29, 1994	1. One Birth: Two Stories 2. The Puzzle Of Bethelehem 3. The Magi And The Star 4. The Virgin Birth 5. A Story Of Christmas	Interviews with John Dominic Crossan, Ronald F. Hock, Dr. Michael L. Cook, John Mosley, Dr. Donald A. Hagner	Gospel of Luke 2:30, 2:8, 2:11, 2:34, Gospel of Matthew 2;2, 2:8, 2:13, 2:10, 2:9, Gospel of Mark 1:9, Book of Micah 5:2, Book of Isaiah 7:14	
#7 "A Violent God"	May 6, 1994	1. A New God Is Born 2. The Divine Warrior 3. Lord Of The Conquest 4. A Punishing God 5. A Path Of Peace	Interviews with Dr. Daniel L. Smith-Christopher, Dr. Jonathan Wilson (author) (as John Wilson), Dr. Norman K. Gottwald, Rabbi David Wolpe, Susan Niditch, Dr. Lawrence H. Schiffman, Dr. David Ussishkin, Dr. Charles Lynn Batten, Dr. Marie Ann Mayeski	Book of Isaiah 2:4, 13:5, 5:28, 11:6, Book of Genesis 12:1, Book of Exodus 11:4, 15:3 19:20, 21:23, Book of Deuteronomy 8:17, Book of Joshua 6:17, Book of Leviticus 18:24, Book of Jeremiah 10:5, Gospel of Matthew 5:8, 5:39, Book of Revelation 19:11, 21:1, Book of Ecclesiastes 3:1	
#8 "Noah and the Flood"	May 13, 1994	1. Deluge 2. The Unfound Ark 3. Two By Two 4. Many Peoples Many Floods 5. Of Rainbows And Peace	Interviews with Rabbi David Wolpe, Alan Dundes, Walter Zanger, Nahum Sarna, Lloyd Richard Bailey, Charles Lynn Batten, and Dr. Daniel L. Smith-Christopher	Book of Genesis 7:9, 6:5, 6:14, 6:18, 7:11, 8:10, 8:4, 7:2, 7:6, 9:20, 9:24, 1:29, 9:2, 9:13, 9:1	
#9 "Scarlet Women of the Bible"	May 20, 1994	1. Eve: Innocence And Knowledge 2. Delilah: Seduction And Betrayal 3. Jezebel: Foreign Gods 4. A Painted Face 5. Salome: A Dance And A Murder	Interviews with Dr. Tamara Eskenazi, Dr. Jo Ann Hackett, Dr. David Gunn, Dr. Claudia Camp, Dr. Susan Niditch, Dr. Daniel L. Smith-Christopher, Dr. Jonathan Wilson (author)(as John Wilson), Dr. William G. Dever, Rabbi David Wolpe	Book of Genesis 2:7, 2:16, 3:4, 3:6 First Epistle to Timothy 2:9, Book of Judges 13:3, 14:5, 16:4, 16:6, 16:9, 16:15, 16:17, 16:19, 16:29, 2 Books of Kings 9:37, 9:32, 1 Books of Kings 18:21, 21:15, 21:23, 21:25, 21:29, 21:39, Gospel of Matthew 11:11, 14:8, Gospel of Mark 6:19, 6:21, 6:24, Josephus Antiquities of the Jews 18:5	NOTE: Neglects to mention the name Jezebel is used again in the Book of Revelation 2:20.
#10"Jerusalem: Holy Deadly City"	May 27, 1994	1. A Sacred Place Is Born 2. Holy Of Holies 3. 430 Tons 4. Burned Alive 5. Abraham's Children	Interviews with Rabbi Lawrence Schiffman, Walter Zanger, Rabbi David Wolpe, Frank A. Peters, William G. Dever, Dr. John Wilson, Dr. Daniel L. Smith-Christopher, Dr. Fathi Osman	Book of Zechariah 8:3, Book of Genesis 22:2, 22:11, 2 Book of Samuel 7:10, 1 Chronicles 15:3, 2 Chronicles 7:16, Book of Isaiah 31:5, Psalm 122:6, 137:5, Gospel of Luke 19:45, Book of Jeremiah 3:17, The Koran 1;1, 37:102, 17:1	

=== Season 2 ===
Title	Original Airdate	Chapters/ Acts	Interviews	Biblical & Extra Biblical Verses	NOTES
#1 "King David: Poet Warrior"	September 16, 1994	1. God's Chosen King 2. Dead Run 3. A United Kingdom 4. Fall From Grace 5. Pretender To The Throne	Interviews with Walter Zanger, Dr. Avraham Biran, Rabbi David Wolpe, Dr. P. Kyle McCarter Jr., Daniel Smith-Christopher, Dr. Baruch Halpern, Dr. William G. Dever, Rabbi Aron Tendler	1 Samuel 16:1, 16:18, 17:1, 24:4, 2 Samuel 5:1, 11:2, 11:14, 12:9, 12:13, 18:33, 1 Kings 2:10	
#2 "Abraham: One Man, One God"	January 6, 1995	1. War of the Idols 2. A Journey of Faith 3. The Covenant 4. A Father's Sacrifice 5. Tombs of the Patriarchs	Interviews with Rabbi David Wolpe, Walter Zanger, Dr. Nahum Sarna, Dr. Marc Z. Brettler, William G. Dever, and Dr. Wadad Kadi	Book of Genesis 11:3, 12:2, 12:7, 12:10, 14:20, 16:2, 16:5, 17:5, 17:12, 17:12, 17:16, 18:26, 18:32, 21:4, 21:10, 22:1, 22:8, 22:13, 22:18, 25:8	
#3 "Apocalypse: The Puzzle of Revelation"	January 13, 1995	1. Doomsday Scenario 2. The Four Horsemen of the Apocalypse 3. The End of the World 4. Armageddon 5. The Place of Battles	Interviews with James D. Tabor, Donald Senior, David L. Barr, Adela Yarbro Collins, and John J. Collins	The Book of Revelation 11:18, 21:1, 6:7, 16:17, 20:11, 13;1, 2:19, The Book of Daniel 7:2, The Book of Judges 6:19	
#4 "Archenemy: The Philistines"	January 27, 1995	1. A Savage People 2. A Mysterious People 3. Enemy And Neighbor 4. Fight To the Finish 5. A Mysterious Disappearance	Interviews with Walter Zanger, Dr. Trude Dothan, Barry M. Gitlen, Robert Stieglitz, Seymour Gitin, Daniel L. Smith-Christopher	1 Samuel 4:1, 13;19, 4:10, 6:1, 6:13, 7:10, 13:3, 17:4, 17:42, 19:10, 27:1, 31:1, Book of Exodus 13;17, Book of Judges 13:1, 14:1, 16:4, 16:19, 16:29, 2 Samuel 5:17, 5:23, Book of Zephaniah 2:4	
#5 "Queen Esther: Far Away and Long Ago"	March 10, 1995	1. The Winds & The Exiles 2. At the Crossroads 3. Exits and Entrances 4. God Behind the Scenes 5. Prejudice and Genocide	Interviews with Walter Zanger, Edwin M. Yamauchi, William Shea, Carey Moore, Larry Wills, Katheryn Darr	Book of Esther 1:1, 1:6, 1:12, 2:4, 2:8, 2:17, 2:21, 3:2, 3:6, 3:7, 3:13, 4:11, 4:14, 4:16, 5:3, 5:4, 5:9, 6:1, 6:6, 7:4, 7:8, 9:6, 9:22, 9:28, Book of Deuteronomy 4:27	
#6 "Prophets: Soul Catchers"	March 17, 1995	1. Thus Saith The Lord 2. Channels Of God 3. It Is Written 4. Holy City, Holy Men 5. Silence	Interviews with David L. Lieber, Walter Zanger, Herbert B. Huffmon, Katheryn Pfisterer, Katherine Doob Sakenfeld, Joseph Blekinsopp, Walter Bruggemann	Book of Ezekiel 1:15, 1:17, 1:24, 2:3, 36:24, Book of Numbers 12:6, 1 Book of Samuel 10:5 10:25, 1 Kings 18:19, 19:11, Book of Deuteronomy 18:21, Book of Amos 5:14, 9:7, 10:11, Book of Isaiah 2:4, 6:1, 7:14, 7:17, 10:24, 37:33, Gospel of Matthew 1:23	
#7 "The Execution of Jesus"	April 14, 1995	1. Into Jerusalem 2. Miracles And Betrayal 3. Condemned To Die 4. The Crucifixion 5. The Promise	Father Donald Senior, Father John P. Meier, John Dominic Crossan, Bart D. Ehrman, Donald Hagner, Adela Yarbro Collins, Michael L. Cook, John McCray	Gospel of Matthew 21:10, 23:27, 26:37, 26:3, 26:36, 27:11, 27:45 Book of Zechariah 9:9, Gospel of Mark 11:5, 11:18, 12:15, 14:10, 14:6, 13:26, 14:17, 14:22, 14:45, 14:61, 15:11, 15:15, 15:25, 16:9, 16:15, 16:19, Gospel of John 11:43, 13:35	

=== Season 3 ===
Title	Original Airdate	Chapters/ Acts	Interviews	Biblical & Extra Biblical Verses	NOTES
#1 "Joseph: Master of Dreams"	September 9, 1995	1. Destiny 2. Coat of Many Colors 3. Seduction 4. A Pharaoh Dreams 5. Long Lost Brother	Interviews with Rabbi David Wolpe, Donald Redford, James K. Hoffmeier, Daniel L. Smith-Christopher, William G. Dever, Nahum M. Sarna	Book of Genesis 37:4, 37:7, 37:19, 37:35, 39:12, 40:17, 41:4, 41:42, 41:55, 42:2, 42:6, 42:13, 43:27, 44:27, 44:33, 45:3, 45:7	
#2 "Herod the Great"	December 15, 1995	1. An Uneasy King 2. Trail of Blood 3. Grand Obsession 4. Jewel By The Sea 5. The End of Violence	Interviews with Dr. Kenneth G. Holum, Dr. Lawrence H. Schiffman, Dr. Shaye Cohen, Walter Zanger, and Dr. Peter Richardson.	Gospel of Matthew 2:3, 2:13, 2:16, Josephus Antiquities of the Jews, Gospel of Luke 2:10, Josephus The Jewish War	
#3 "The Bible's Greatest Secrets"	January 4, 1996	1. Only Ashes 2. Quest In The Holy land 3. New Ideas, New Science 4. The Warrior Archeologist 5. Into The Past 6. Bones, Stones, and Computer Chips	Interviews with Walter Zanger, Eric M. Myers, Hershel Shanks, Amnon Ben-Tor, Carol Myers, Oleg Grabar, William G. Dever	Book of Job 34:15, Book of Joshua 6:13, 10:10 Gospel of Mark 1:21, Book of Revelation 19:19, Book of Numbers 6:24, 1 Kings 9:15, Josephus The Jewish War	NOTE: Features Archival Footage of Yigael Yadin.
#4 "The Last Revolt"	January 7, 1996	1. Roots of Revolution 2. Jerusalem: A City Divided 3. A Questionable Source 4. Prologue To Destruction 5. Fall of the Temple	Interviews with Walter Zanger, Lawrence Schiffman, Peter Richardson, Dr. Shaye Cohen, Richard A. Horsely, Mordecai Aviam, David L. Barr, John Dominic Crossan	Josephus The Jewish War	
#5 "Angels and Devils"	January 18, 1996				NOTE: TV Guide has this listed as an episode of Ancient Mysteries.
#6 "Life and Death Of the Holy Temple"	January 25, 1996	1. The Holy Of Holies 2. The Ark Of The Covenant 3. Cradle Of The World 4. A Miracle On The Mount 5. A Holy Quest	Interviews with Rabbi Aron B. Tendler, Rabbi David Wolpe, Graham Hancock, Baruch A. Levine, Walter Zanger	1 Kings 6:2, 6:5, Book of Exodus 25:10, Book of Numbers 11:4, Book of Isaiah 1:11, Book of Jeremiah 7:9, Gospel of Matthew 21:12, 2 Kings 21:9	
#7 "Who Wrote the Bible? Part 1 of 2"	February 25, 1996	1. In The Beginning 2. The Legacy 3. Holy Words 4. A Nation Divided 5. The Written Word 6. The Hebrew Bible	Interviews with Lawrence Schiffman, Rabbi David Wolpe, Aron Tendler, Jerry Falwell, David L. Barr, Walter Zanger, Hershel Shanks, Dr. Michael Wise, Joseph Blenkinsopp, Richard Eliot Friedman, Dr. Daniel Smith-Christopher,	Deuteronomy 6:1, 31:9, 34:5, Dead Sea Scrolls 4Q416, 4Q418, 4Q398, Genesis 6:19, Exodus 3:2, 3:6, 1 Book of Kings 2:26, 2 Kings 17:18, 22:8, Book of Jeremiah 36:32, 16:11, Ezra 1:1, Book of Nehemiah 8:2, Song of Solomon 7:1, Book of Isaiah 1:11, 65:17, Book of Amos 2:6, Book of Numbers 21: , Book of Joshua, 1 Chronicles 29:29	
#8 "Who Wrote the Bible? Part 2 of 2"	February 25, 1996	7. Godspell 8. A New Testament 9. Out of the Past 10. Emergence 11. Mystical Text 12. Living Words	Interviews with John Dominic Crossan, Bart Ehrman, Stephen J. Patterson, John P. Meier, James M. Robinson, Thomas Pattie, Rabbi Eric Ray, Rabbi Jonathan Omer-Man, Rabbi Philip S. Berg	Gospel of Mark 1:14, 8:34, 15:34, 10:14, Gospel of John 18:38, 1:1 Gospel of Matthew 19:14, Gospel of Luke 18:16, Romans 16:22, Book of Revelation 16:13, Wisdom of Ben Sirach 5:10, Dialogue of the Savior verse 122, Gospel of Thomas 49, 92, 24, 38	
#9 "Heaven and Hell"	April 6, 1996	1. Life After Death 2. Christ And Satan 3. Eternal Damnation 4. Purgatory 5. From Here To Eternity	Interviews with Norman L. Geisler, James D. Tabor, Alan E. Bernstein, Father Thomas P. Rausch, Jeffrey Burton Russell, Richard Heinberg, and Rabbi Aron Tendler.	Book of Genesis 3:19, Book of Jeremiah 19:8, Book of Daniel 12:2, Gospel of Luke 4:13, Book of Revelation 20:10, 1 Enoch 102	NOTE: Features footage from the film Angel on My Shoulder (film).
#10 "The Lost Years of Jesus"	May 25, 1996	1. Quest For Jesus 2. Into India 3. England And The Holy Grail 4. Discovery In The Wilderness 5. Revolt In Palestine	Interviews with Michael L. Cook, Paul Park, Robert Eisenman, William Bramley, Elizabeth McNamer, Holger Kersten, and Yatindra Bnatnagar.	Gospel of Matthew 1:20, 26:27, 5:38, 10:34, 26:50, Gospel of Luke 2:46, 2:51, Gospel of Mark 1:4, 1:9	NOTE: Featured excerpt of poem "And did those feet in ancient time" by William Blake.

=== Season 4 ===
Title	Original Airdate	Chapters/ Acts	Interviews	Biblical & Extra Biblical Verses	NOTES
#1 "Job: The Devil's Test"	September 12, 1996	1. Satan's Wager 2. "Naked Came I..." 3. The Impatience of Job 4. An Imagined Life 5. Triumph Over Torment	Interviews with Carole Fontaine, Daniel L. Smith-Christopher, Rabbi David Wolpe, William Safire, Douglas Stuart, and Harold Kushner	Book of Job 30:19, 3:3, 1:6, 1:16, 2:7, 2:9, 3:11, 8:6, 16:16, 31:6, 38:2, 38:19, 38:29, 42:16	
#2 "Jacob's Ladder"	September 26, 1996	1. Destiny and Deception 2. Angels 3. Forbidden Marriage 4. Wrestling With God 5. The Ten Lost Tribes	Interviews with Rabbi David Wolpe, Carole Fontaine, Douglas Stuart, Walter Zanger, Dr. Lawrence H. Schiffman, and Daniel L. Smith-Christopher.	Book of Genesis 37:4, 37:7, 37:19, 37:35, 39:12, 40:17, 41:4, 41:42, 41:55, 42:2, 42:6, 42:13, 43:27, 44:27, 44:33, 45:3, 45:7	
#3 "Biblical Angels"	November 14, 1996	1. Divine Spirits 2. Angels In Exile 3. The Apocalypse 4. Celestial Guardians 5. Earthly Spirits	Interviews with Roy-Charles Coulombe, Carol A. Newsom, Lawrence H. Schiffman, Rabbi David Wolpe, Isaac Canales, Michael Allen	Book of Judges 13;6, Book of Genesis 3:24, 6:1, 18:14, 22:12, Book of Daniel 10:5 6:16, Gospel of Luke 2:6, Gospel of Matthew 28:6, Book of Revelation 12:9, 9:15, 6:8, 1 Enoch 40:1	
#4 "The Last Supper"	November 21, 1996	1. Journey To Jerusalem 2. A Deadly Premonition 3. The Passover Seder 4. The Betrayal 5. Holy Communion	Interviews with [[Karen Jo Torjesen]], Bart Ehrman, John Dominic Crossan, Lawrence Schiffman, Donald Senior	Book of Exodus 13;13, 12:12, Gospel of Mark 11;15, 14:2, 14;10, 14:12, 14:19, 14;32, 14:45, Gospel of Matthew 25:24, 26:36, 27:11	
#5 "Love and Sex in the Hebrew Bible"	December 12, 1996	1. Be Fruitful and Multiply 2. Sex and Marriage 3. Forbidden Sex 4. Affairs of State 5. Erotica	Interviews with Carole Fontaine, Rabbi David Wolpe, Howard Schwartz, Rabbi Gershon Winkler, Carol Meyers	Book of Genesis 1:27, 2:15, 29:16, 30:1, 19:5, 19:7, 19:23, 19:31, Book of Proverbs 5:19, 6:24, Book of Exodus 20:14, 2 Samuel 11:2, 12:9, 13:13, Song of Solomon 7:7, 7:2, 5:4, 8:6	
#6 "Cain and Abel: A Murder Mystery"	March 8, 1997	1. Blood Brothers 2. The Motive 3. The Crime 4. The Fugitive 5. My Brother's Keeper	Interviews with Rabbi David Wolpe, Carole Fontaine, Douglas Stuart, Ronald S. Hendel, Nahum M. Sarna	Book of Genesis 4:1, 4:2, 4:3, 4:5, 4:6, 4:8, 4:9, 4;12, 4:17, 4:25	
#7 "The Story of Creation"	April 6, 1997	1. In The Beginning 2. On The Seventh Day 3. Adam's Rib 4. Paradise Lost 5. Birth of the Universe	Interviews with Rabbi David Wolpe, Carole Fontaine, Nahum M. Sarna, Robert C. Newman, Douglas Stuart	Book of Genesis 1:5, 1:25, 1:28, 1:31, 2:3, 2:7, 2:9, 2:18, 2:23, 22:22	
#8 "Paul the Apostle"	April 13, 1997	1. Road To Damascus 2. The Hidden Years 3. The Mysteries Of Tarsus 4. New Clues, Ancient World 5. The Enignma Of The End	Interviews with Robert M. Price, Rev Robert Morris, Wayne Meeks, Susan Alcock, Paul Maier	Epistle to the Galatians 2:20, 1:15, 1:16, 5:21, Acts of the Apostles 8:3, 9:3, 9:8, 25:11, 28:30, Second Epistle to the Corinthians 12:2, 11:32, Apocalypse of Paul, Second Epistle to Timothy 4:6-8, First Epistle to the Corinthians 1:13	
#9 "King Solomon"	April 20, 1997	1. The Gift of Wisdom 2. A Child Divided In Two 3. Power Corrupts 4. Queen of Sheba 5. Night of Passion	Interviews with Carole Fontaine, Rabbi David Wolpe, Barbara Koltuv, Rabbi Aron B. Tendler, Daniel L. Smith-Christopher, Stuart Lasine, Carol Meyers	1 Kings 3:24, 1:17, 3:9, 3:25, 3:27, 6:36, 10:1, 10:13, Song of Solomon 4:9, Book of Ecclesiastes 3:2	
#10 "Mary of Nazareth"	May 11, 1997	1. A Prayer Answered 2. Chosen By God 3. Jesus Is Born 4. A Mysterious Role 5. Visions of the Holy Mother	Interviews with Carole Fontaine, Beverly R. Gaventa, Paul L. Maier, Gloria Blanchfield Thomas.	Gospel of Luke 1:28, 1:31, 1:34, 1:35, 2:4, 2:7, 1:46, Infancy Gospel of James, Gospel of Matthew 1:18, 1:20, 2:13, 2:20 Gospel of Mark 6:3, Gospel of John 2:1, 2:3, 19:26, Book of Acts 1:14, 2:2, Assumption of Mary	
#11 "The Ten Commandments"	June 8, 1997	1. Chosen People 2. The Golden Calf 3. Wilderness of the Spirit 4. Crime and Punishment 5. Tablets of the Covenant	Interviews with Rabbi David Wolpe, Carole Fontaine, Stephen Breck Reid, Father Thomas P. Rausch, Pamela Scalise.	Book of Genesis 12:1, Book of Exodus 3:7, 19:5, 19:18, 20;2, 20:8, 31:18, 32:28, Book of Deuteronomy 5:15, 34;4, 1 Kings 8:5	

=== Season 5 ===
Title	Original Airdate	Chapters/ Acts	Interviews	Biblical & Extra Biblical Verses	NOTES
#1 "Messiahs"	August 10, 1997	1. The Dream Is Born 2. Jesus - The Man From Galilee 3. The Cave Of Horrors 4. The Mad Messiah 5. The Messiah Yet To Come	Interviews with Rabbi David Wolpe, James D. Tabor, David Berger (professor), Lawrence Schiffman, Marianne Meye Thompson, and James Charlesworth	Book of Exodus 40:13, 2 Book of Samuel 7:16, Book of Jeremiah 33:14, Book of Micah 5:2, Gospel of Mark 1:9, Gospel of John 4:25, Book of Isaiah 53, Josephus Antiquities of the Jews, Book of Ezekiel 37:11	
#2 "Old Testament Heroines"	November 1, 1997	1. Two Mothers, Two Nations 2. In The Shadow Of Her Brother 3. The Glory Shall Belong To A Woman 4. Your People Shall Be My People 5. A Secret Identity	Interviews with Stephen Breck Reid, Daniel L. Smith-Christopher, Gail A. Yee, Amy-Jill Levine, Miriam Peskowitz	Book of Genesis 16:5, Book of Exodus 2:5, 15:1, Book of Numbers 12:1, Book of Judges, Book of Ruth 1:3, Book of Esther 2:2, 5:2	
#3 "Judas: The Ultimate Betrayal"	December 6, 1997	1. The Man Who Walked With Jesus 2. Final Pilgrimage 3. Woe To The Man 4. The Fateful Kiss 5. Father, Forgive Them	Interviews with Ruth Tucker, John Dominic Crossan, Hyam Maccoby, William Klassen	The Gospel of Matthew 10:2, 26:26, 26:24, 26:48, 27:1, 27:3, The Gospel of Mark 11:15, 14:10, The Gospel of John 13:26, The Gospel of Luke 23:34	NOTE: Featured footage from the silent film From the Manger to the Cross and the television film I Beheld His Glory.
#4 "Maccabees: Revolution and Redemption"	December 20, 1997	1. A Tyrannical Empire 2. A Leader Arises 3. War! 4. Rededication 5. Miracle	Interviews with David Baron, Erich Gruen, Robert Eisenman, Lawrence Schiffman, Anthony Saladrini	1 Maccabees 1:8, 1:20, 1:44, 2:15, 2:24, 3:32, 4:20, 4:38, 4:44, 4:59 2 Maccabees 4:7, 6:3, 7:9, 15:15	NOTE: Featured footage from the film Il vecchio testamento
#5 "John the Baptist"	March 7, 1998	1. Miraculous Birth 2. Out of the Wilderness 3. Herald of the Messiah 4. Arrest and Conviction 5. The Dance of Salome	Interviews with John Dominic Crossan, Isaac J. Canales, Father Thomas P. Rausch, Robert Eisenman PHD, James D. Tabor.	Gospel of Luke 1:16, 1:41, 1:76, 1:80, 3:9, 3:15, 7:19, 7:28, Gospel of Matthew 3:4, 3:5, 3:9, 3:13, 3:16, 3:14, 14:8, 14:12, Gospel of John 4:1, Josephus Antiquities of the Jews 5:2, Gospel of Mark 6:17, 6:14.	
#6 "Magic and Miracles in the Old Testament"	June 7, 1998	1. Let My People Go! 2. The Miraculous Journey 3. The Witch of Endor 4. Miracle Vs. Magic 5. The Everlasting Miracle	Interviews with Byron G. Curtis, Rabbi David Wolpe, Yair Zakovitch, Kenneth A. Kitchen, Hans Goedicke	Book of Exodus 7:9, 13:21, 14:27, Book of Numbers 20:12, Book of Deuteronomy 18:10, 1 Book of Samuel 28:5, 28:7, 28:19, 1 Books of Kings 17:15, 17:21, 18:27, 18:38 Book of Genesis 1	
#7 "Samson and Delilah"	June 13, 1998	1. The Promise Of His Birth 2. A Mixed Marriage 3. Warrior Hero 4. Betrayal 5. His Strength Restored	Interviews with Rabbi David Wolpe, Daniel L. Smith-Christopher, Gregory Mobley, Carole Fontaine.	Book of Judges 16:19, 13:4, 14:3, 14:4, 14:14, 15:4, 15:12, 15:15-16, 16:1, 16:5-6, 16:15, 16:20, 16;13, 16:30	

Note that there may be more episodes.

== Discovery Channel series ==
- "The Exodus Revealed"
- "Helena"
- "The Secret of the Dead Sea Scrolls"
- "Jesus and the Shroud of Turin"
- "Heaven, Our Eternal Home"
- "The Gates of Jerusalem"

== See also ==
- The Bible's Buried Secrets - a PBS documentary (2008)
- History's Mysteries, 1998-2006
- List of Digging for the Truth episodes
- Daniel L. Smith-Christopher
