= Great Church =

Concept in the historiography of early Christianity

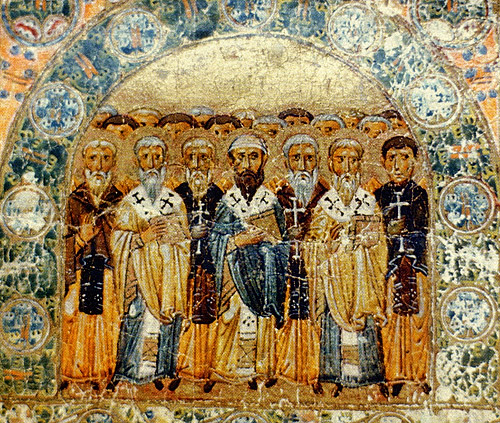
The Church Fathers in an 11th-century depiction from Kyiv

In the historiography of early Christianity, the "Great Church" (Latin: ecclesia magna) was the period of about 180 to 313, between that of primitive Christianity and that of the legalization of the Christian religion in the Roman Empire, corresponding closely to what is called the Ante-Nicene Period. "It has rightly been called the period of the Great Church, in view of its numerical growth, its constitutional development and its intense theological activity."

The Great Church, also called the catholic (i.e., universal) Church, has been defined also as meaning "the Church as defended by such as Ignatius of Antioch, Irenaeus of Lyons, Cyprian of Carthage, and Origen of Alexandria and characterized as possessing a single teaching and communion over and against the division of the sects, e.g., gnosticism, and the heresies".

By the beginning of the fourth century, the Great Church already formed about 15% of the population of the Roman Empire and was ready, both numerically and structurally, for its role as the church of the empire, becoming the state religion of the Roman Empire in 380.

Roger F. Olson says: "According to the Roman Catholic account of the history of Christian theology, the Great Church catholic and orthodox lived on from the apostles to today in the West and all bishops that remained in fellowship with the bishop of Rome have constituted its hierarchy"; or, as the Catholic Church itself has expressed it, "This Church constituted and organized in the world as a society, subsists in the Catholic Church, which is governed by the successor of Peter and by the Bishops in communion with him, although many elements of sanctification and of truth are found outside of its visible structure." Thus, the Roman Catholic Church identifies itself as the continuation of the Great Church, which in turn was the same as the early Church founded by Jesus Christ. Because of this, it identifies itself as the "one true church".

The unbroken continuity of the Great Church is affirmed also by the Eastern Orthodox Church: "Orthodoxy regards the Great Church in antiquity (for most of the first millennium) as comprising, on one side, the Eastern Orthodox world (the Byzantine patriarchates presided over by the hierarch of the Church of Constantinople together with the Slavic Orthodox churches); and, on the other side, the Western Catholic Church, presided over by the hierarch of the Church of Rome."

== Emergence ==
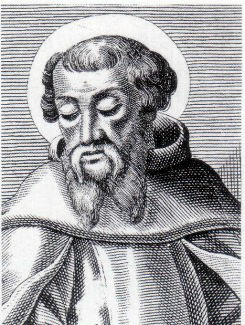
Irenaeus (2nd century – c. 202)

Lawrence S. Cunningham, and separately, Kugel and Greer state that Irenaeus's statement in Against Heresies Chapter X 1–2 (written c. 180 AD) is the first recorded reference to the existence of a "Church" with a core set of shared beliefs as opposed to the ideas of dissident groups. Irenaeus states:

The Church, though dispersed through the whole world, even to the ends of the earth, has received from the apostles and their disciples this faith: ... As I have already observed, the Church, having received this preaching and this faith, although scattered throughout the whole world, yet, as if occupying but one house, carefully preserves it. ... For the churches which have been planted in Germany do not believe or hand down anything different, nor do those in Spain, nor those in Gaul, nor those in the East, nor those in Egypt, nor those in Libya, nor those which have been established in the central regions of the world. But as the sun, that creature of God, is one and the same throughout the whole world, so also the preaching of the truth shineth everywhere, and enlightens all men that are willing to come to a knowledge of the truth.

Cunningham states that two points in Irenaeus' writing deserve attention. First, that Irenaeus distinguished the Church singular from "the churches" plural, and more importantly, Irenaeus holds that only in the larger singular Church does one find the truth handed down by the apostles of Christ.

At the beginning of the 3rd century the Great Church that Irenaeus and Celsus had referred to had spread across a significant portion of the world, with most of its members living in cities (see early centers of Christianity). The growth was less than uniform across the world. The Chronicle of Arbela stated that in 225 AD, there were 20 bishops in all of Persia, while at approximately the same time, surrounding areas of Rome had over 60 bishops. But the Great Church of the 3rd century was not monolithic, consisting of a network of churches connected across cultural zones by lines of communication which at times included personal relationships.

The Great Church grew in the 2nd century and entered the 3rd century mainly in two empires: the Roman and the Persian, with the network of bishops usually acting as the cohesive element across cultural zones. In 313, the Edict of Milan ended the persecution of Christians, and by 380 the Great Church had gathered enough followers to become the State church of the Roman Empire by virtue of the Edict of Thessalonica.

== Historical references ==
In Contra Celsum 5.59 and 5.61 the Church Father Origen mentions Celsus' late 2nd century use of the terms "church of the multitudes" or "great church" to refer to the emerging consensus traditions among Christians at the time, as Christianity was taking shape.

In the 4th century, as Saint Augustine commented on Psalm XXII, he interpreted the term to mean the whole world, writing: "The great Church, Brethren, what is it? Is a scanty portion of the earth the great Church? The great Church means the whole world." Augustine continued to expound on how various churches all considered themselves "the great Church", but that only the whole world could be seen as the great Church.

== Theological underpinnings and separation ==
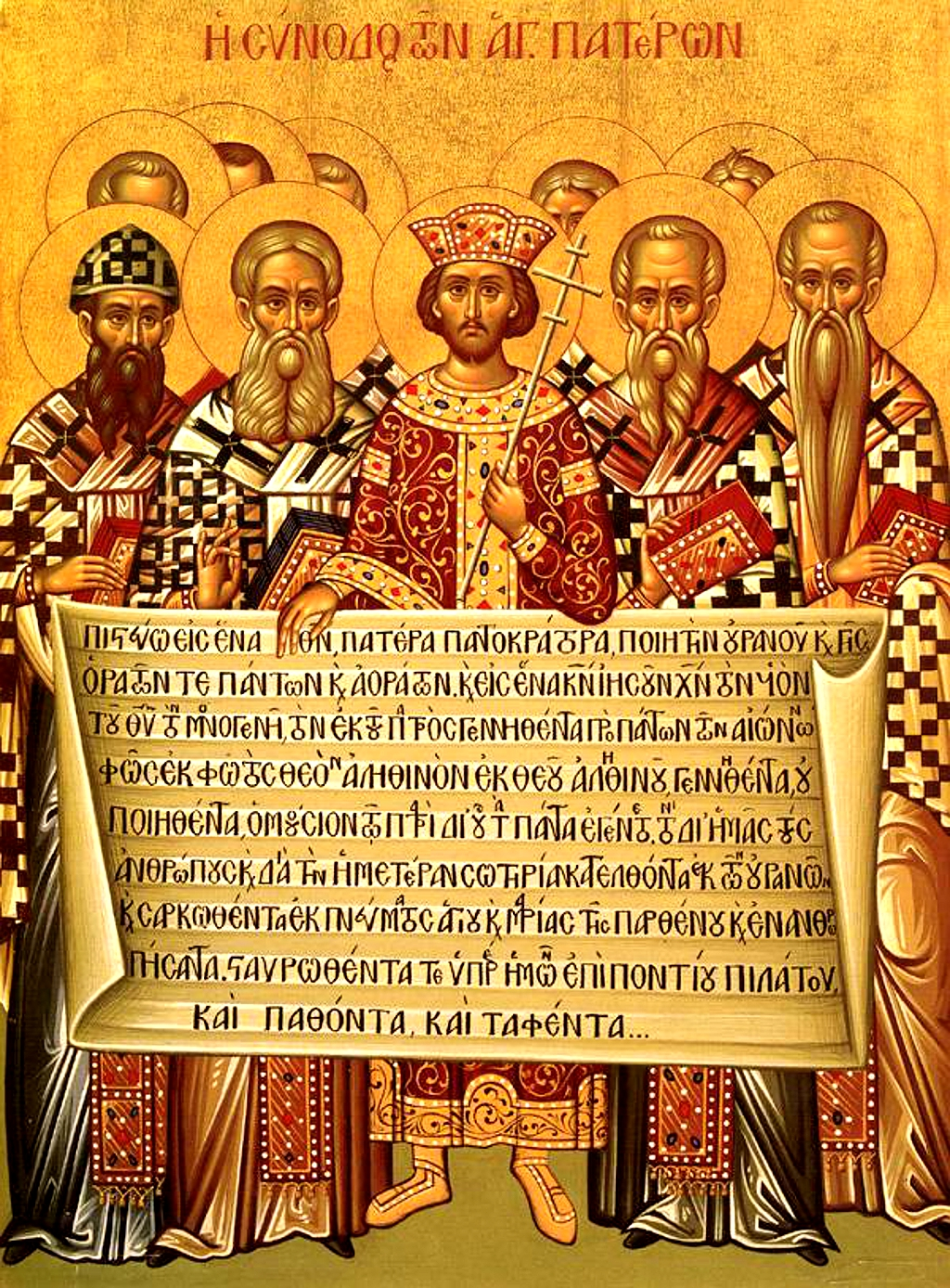
Emperor Constantine and bishops with the Creed of 381.

The epoch of the Great Church witnessed the development of key theological concepts which now form the fabric of the religious beliefs of the large majority of Christians.

Relying on Scripture, prevailing mysticism and popular piety, Irenaeus formalized some of the attributes of God, writing in Against Heresies Book IV, Chapter 19: "His greatness lacks nothing, but contains all things." Irenaeus also referred to the early use of the "Father, Son and Holy Spirit" formula which appeared as part of Christian Creeds, writing in Against Heresies (Book I Chapter X):

The Church… believes in one God, the Father Almighty, Maker of heaven, and earth, and the sea, and all things that are in them; and in one Christ Jesus, the Son of God, who became incarnate for our salvation; and in the Holy Spirit.

Around 213 AD in Adversus Praxeas (chapter 3) Tertullian provided a formal representation of the concept of the Trinity, i.e., that God exists as one "substance" but three "Persons": The Father, the Son and the Holy Spirit. Unlike later forms of the Trinity, however, Tertullian also expressed in chapter 6 of his work Adversus Praxeas, a belief in the Son being both "created and begotten", and in his work Adversus Hermogenes (chapter 3) of the Son having a "beginning" and time he did "not exist". The First Council of Nicaea in 325 and later the First Council of Constantinople in 381 after the 55 year long Arian Controversy that threatened to split the Great Church in two over a debate concerning the "nature and substance" of the Son, then formalized these elements, but differing to Tertullian with the affirmation that the Son was also "co-eternal" with the Father without a beginning, being "begotten not made".

After 381, Christians outside of the Roman Empire living in the Gothic Kingdoms, continued to adhere to Arian Christology, but were considered schismatics and heretics by the majority in Great Church and Rome. The Goth Kingdoms later converted to the "Nicene orthodoxy" of the Great Church by the end of the 7th century.

In 451, all the bishops of the Great Church were ordered to attend the Council of Chalcedon to discuss theological issues that had emerged. This turned out to be a turning point at which the Western and Eastern churches parted ways based on seemingly small Christological differences, and began the fracturing of the claim to the term Great Church by both sides.

== Modern theories on the formation of the Great Church ==
Official Catholic publications, and other writers, sometimes consider that the concept of the "Great Church" can be found already in the Epistles of Paul, such as in "This is my rule in all the churches" (1 Corinthians 7:17) and in the Apostolic Fathers such as the letters of Ignatius of Antioch. Exegesis has even located the ecclesia magna in the Latin Vulgate translations of the "great congregation" (kahal rab) of the Hebrew Bible. This interpretation was also offered by Pope Benedict XVI, and by Martin Luther.

Dennis Minns (2010) considers that the concept of a "Great Church" was developed by polemical heresiologists such as Irenaeus. The presentation of early Christian unity and orthodoxy (see Proto-orthodox Christianity), and counter presentation of groups such as those sects labelled "Gnostic", by early heresiologists such as Irenaeus is questioned by modern historians.

Roger E. Olson (1999) uses the term to refer to the Great Church at the time of the Council of Chalcedon (451) when the Patriarch of Constantinople and Bishop of Rome were in fellowship with each other.

=== In contrast to "Jewish Christianity" ===
The term is contrasted with Jewish Christians who came to be more and more clearly separated from the Great Church. Wilhelm Schneemelcher and others writing on New Testament Apocrypha distinguish writings as being sectarian or from the Great Church.

Gabriele Waste (2005) is among German scholars using similar references, where the "Große Kirche" ("Great Church") is defined as "Ecclesia ex gentibus" (Church of the Gentiles) in comparison to the "Ecclesia ex circumcisione" (Church of the Circumcision).

In the anglophone world, Bruce J. Malina (1976) contrasted what he calls "Christian Judaism" (usually termed "Jewish Christianity") with "the historically perceived orthodox Christianity that undergirds the ideology of the emergent Great Church."

In francophone scholarship, the term Grande Église (Latin: Ecclesia magna) has also been equated with the "more hellenized" as opposed to "Judaizing" sections of the early church, and the Bar Kokhba revolt is seen as a definitive stage in the separation between Judaism and the Christianity of the "Grande Église". Those stressing this binary view of early Christianity include Simon Claude Mimouni and François Blanchetière.

== See also ==
- Four Great Church Fathers
- Ante-Nicene Period
- Proto-orthodox Christianity
