= T. Canby Jones =

Professor and peace activist

T. Canby Jones (September 21, 1921 in Karuizawa, Japan – February 13, 2014 in Pennsylvania) was a Quaker peace activist, a professor emeritus of Wilmington College in Ohio, and a student of Thomas R. Kelly.

== Biography ==
Thomas Canby Jones was a son of Esther Alsop Balderston Jones (1894(?)–1967) and Thomas E. Jones (1888–1973), who were serving as missionaries for the Friends Mission Board at the time of his birth. His family returned to the US when he was three years old, and his father became president of Fisk University, 1926–1946, and of Earlham College, 1946–1958.

He graduated from Westtown Friends' Boarding School (1938), Haverford College (1942).

During World War II he was a conscientious objector, serving in three Civilian Public Service camps. Immediately after the war he and his wife Helen went to Finnmark province in north Norway where they did postwar reconstruction work under the auspices of the American Friends Service Committee.

On returning to the US, he enrolled at Yale University where he earned divinity and Ph.D. degrees; his doctoral thesis was on the founder of Quakerism, George Fox.

He served as a Professor of Religion & Philosophy at Wilmington College from 1955 until his retirement in 1987. He was a founding member of the Friends Association for Higher Education (FAHE), and a charter member of Campus Friends Meeting in Wilmington, Ohio. He also taught at the Earlham School of Religion in Richmond, Indiana for a short time.

Jones was an advocate of ‘The Lamb’s war’, an early Quaker type of spiritual warfare taught by George Fox and James Nayler.

Jones died in Paoli Memorial Hospital, suburban Philadelphia, Pennsylvania.

== Family ==
Jones married Helen Eunice Meeks on 19 August 1945; they had one son.

== Publications ==
His book publications include;

- ‘Triumph through Obedience’ (1964)
- ‘The Biblical Basis of Conscientious Objection’ (1970)
- ‘Quaker Understanding of Christ and Authority’ (1974) (editor)
- ‘George Fox's Attitude Toward War; A Documentary Study‘ (Friends United Press, 1984)
- ‘The Lamb’s Peacemakers’ (1987)
- ‘ "The Power of the Lord Is Over All": The Pastoral Letters of George Fox’ (Friends United Press, 1989)
- ‘Thomas R. Kelly As I Remember Him’ (Pendle Hill, 1989)
- ‘A Distinctively Quaker View of Teaching and Learning’ (2004)

He also co-wrote a book on David Updegraff.

His personal papers are held by the S. Arthur Watson Library Special Collections, Wilmington College (Ohio). His professional papers are held at the Brynmawr TriCollege Library.

== See also ==
- Daniel L. Smith-Christopher
