= Daniel L. Smith-Christopher =

American theologian (born 1955)

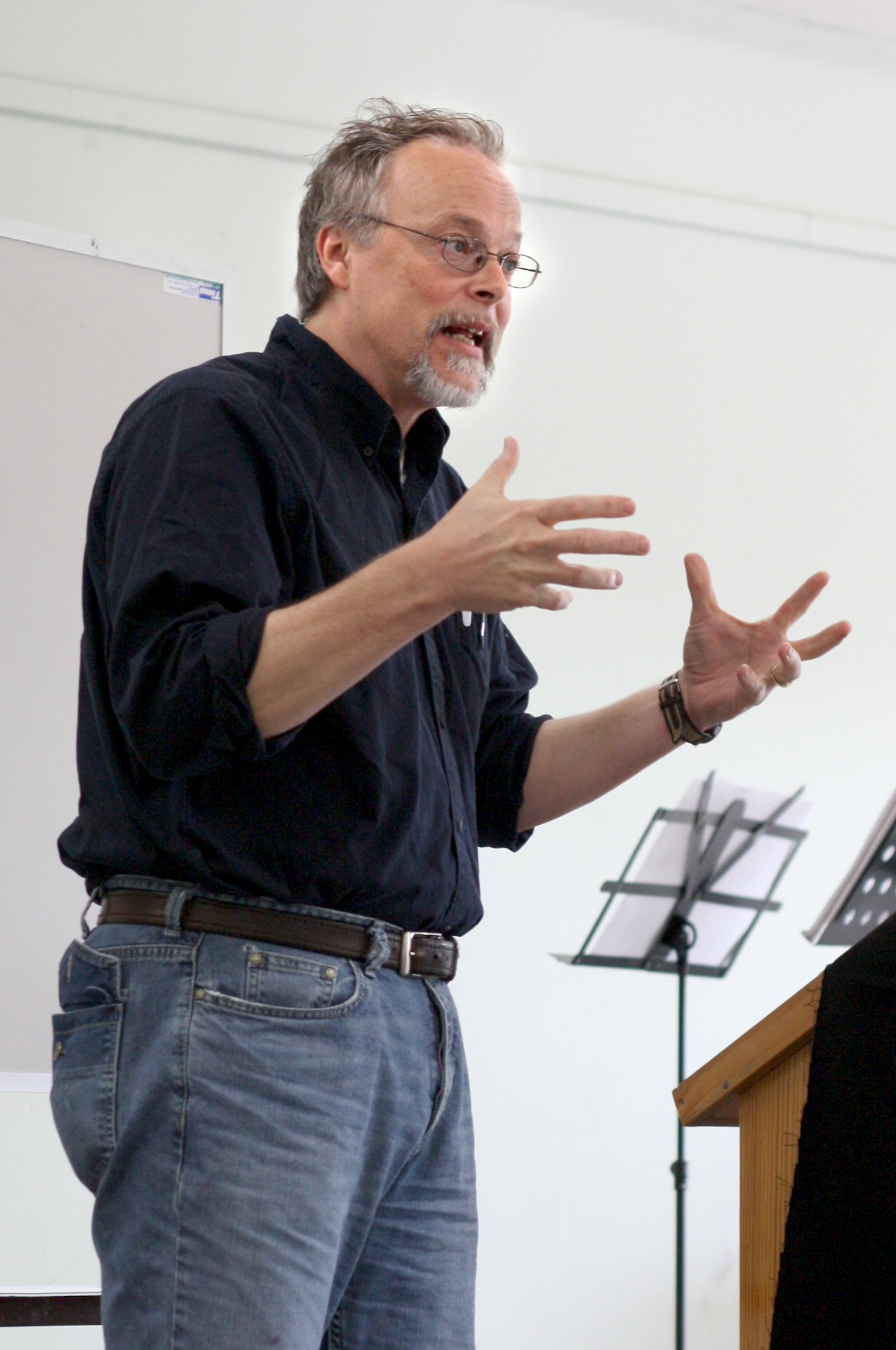
- Smith-Christopher at the School of Discipleship conference, Canberra, July 2009
- Born: April 12, 1955 (age 71)

Academic background
- Education: George Fox College (B.A.); Anabaptist Mennonite Biblical Seminary (M.Div.); Oxford University (D.Phil.)

Daniel L. Smith-Christopher (born April 12, 1955) is an American Hebrew Bible scholar and author. He is Professor of Theological Studies and Director of New Zealand Study Abroad Programs at Loyola Marymount University in Los Angeles, and is frequently quoted on the History Channel's religious programs.

== Early life and education ==
Smith-Christopher was born on April 12, 1955, in Portland, Oregon. He attended George Fox College (B.A.); Associated Mennonite Biblical Seminary (Elkhart, Indiana; M.Div.) and received his doctorate in Old Testament Studies at Oxford University in England, in 1987.

== Career ==
Since 1989 he has taught at Loyola Marymount University in Los Angeles. Smith-Christopher lectures frequently for various adult education venues of the Roman Catholic, United Methodist, Uniting Church in Australia, and other Christian churches. He is frequently quoted in the History Channel's Mysteries of the Bible and other documentaries on religious themes for A&E, the History Channel, National Geographic, and PBS.

Although not Roman Catholic, and therefore not able to be a permanent member, Smith-Christopher was appointed by Cardinal Roger Mahony as a Permanent Consultant to the "Theological Commission" of the Archdiocese of Los Angeles. Smith-Christopher was awarded a Lilly Endowment grant, and with Prof. Mustansir Mir, a noted Quran scholar, Smith-Christopher coordinated the seminar and lectured with Mir on the topic "Peace and Justice in the Bible and the Quran" in summer 2003. Also in summer 2003, Smith-Christopher was invited to deliver a paper for a World Council of Churches consultation in Bangor, Wales (UK), and in the summer of 2004, he delivered a paper at the Parliament of World Religions held in Barcelona, Spain. The theological publisher Fortress Press (Minneapolis), named Smith-Christopher Undergraduate Theology Teacher of the Year in 2006. He also received a Fulbright Lecturer Award to lecture in Religion and Peace Studies at Jaime 1 University in Castellon, Spain. Smith-Christopher has been Director of Study Abroad Programs in New Zealand since the late 1990s, and takes groups of undergraduates and graduate students from Loyola Marymount University, and maintains an interest in New Zealand history, and especially the history of the encounter of the indigenous people of New Zealand, the Maori, and Christianity.

Smith-Christopher has particular interests in cross-cultural interpretation of the Bible, and was invited to write the entry on "Cross-Cultural Interpretation" for the Oxford Encyclopedia of Biblical Interpretation. He has also worked with Blues musician Bernie Pearl on a live presentation and program comparing Blues music with the Book of Lamentations, during which Pearl performs blues selections, as well as working with Zydeco and Flamenco musicians on thematic comparisons between these musical forms and Biblical themes. Smith-Christopher was invited to write the entry on "Blues" for the Oxford Encyclopedia of the Bible and the Arts.

== Works ==
- The Religion of the Landless (1989)
- The Citizen-Temple Community, Joel Weinberg (Translated from German by Daniel Smith-Christopher, 1994)
- Commentary on Daniel (for The New Interpreter's Bible, Vol. 7: Abingdon Press, Nashville, 1996)
- Commentary on Ezra and Nehemiah (Oxford Bible Commentary, 2001)
- Practiced in the Presence: Essays in Honor of T. Canby Jones (with D. N. Snarr, 1994)
- Subverting Hatred: The Challenge of Nonviolence in Religious Traditions (1998)
- A Biblical Theology of Exile (Overtures to Biblical Theology) (2002)
- The Old Testament: Our Call to Faith and Justice - High School Textbook (2005)
- The Old Testament: Our Call to Faith and Justice-Teachers Edition (with Janie Gustafson, Ph.D., 2005)
- Jonah, Jesus, and Other Good Coyotes: Speaking Peace to Power in the Bible (2007)
- Lost Books of the Bible for Dummies (with Stephen Spignesi, 2008)
- Micah: A Commentary (The Old Testament Library), 2015
