= John H. Elliott (biblical scholar) =

American pioneer of social-scientific biblical scholarship (1935–2020)

The Reverend John H. Elliott
- Born: John Hall Elliott; October 23, 1935
- Died: December 13, 2020 (aged 85)

Ecclesiastical career
- Religion: Christianity (Lutheran)
- Ordained: 1964

Academic background
- Education: Concordia Seminary; University of Münster

Academic work
- Discipline: Biblical studies; theology
- Institutions: Concordia Seminary; Webster University; University of San Francisco

John Hall Elliott (October 23, 1935 – December 13, 2020) was an American biblical scholar and professor emeritus of Theology and Religious Studies at the University of San Francisco. A founding member of the Context Group, his scholarship and teaching examine the Bible through interdisciplinary, cross-cultural and ecumenical lenses.

== Education ==
After attending Concordia Preparatory School, Elliott enrolled in Concordia College in 1953. In 1955, he began attending Concordia Seminary, where he later earned a Bachelor of Arts degree (1957), as well as Bachelors and Masters of Divinity degrees (1960). Elliott then pursued doctoral work at the University of Münster, graduating magna cum laude in 1963 with a Doctor of Theology degree. He was ordained a minister of the Lutheran Church in 1964.

== Career ==
Elliott was an assistant professor of exegetical theology at Concordia Seminary from 1963 to 1967. During this same period, he was also a visiting professor of Sacred Scripture at Webster University. In 1967, as the Lutheran Church–Missouri Synod became more conservative, Elliott took a position as a professor of theology and religious studies at the University of San Francisco, a position he would hold until 2001. During this time, he twice won USF's Distinguished Research Award (1982, 2001) as well as its Distinguished Teaching Award (1992). Additionally, he served as the inaugural Honore F. Zabala Chair in Theology (1967–1968), the director of the honors program in the humanities (1982–1992), and won the university's Distinguished Service Award (1992).

He made a deep impact on scholarship, and he played vital roles in the Society of Biblical Literature, the Catholic Biblical Association, and the Context Group. He was a leader in the use of social-scientific methods in biblical research: anthropology, macro-sociology, etc. This was manifested early on in his book A Home for the Homeless (1st ed. 1981; 2nd ed. 1990; reprint, 2005), one of the earliest ground-breaking books employing these methods on the New Testament. His large commentary on 1 Peter (2000) in the Anchor Bible commentary series and his four-volume study of the evil eye (Beware the Evil Eye: The Evil Eye in the Bible and the Ancient World, 2015–2017) exemplify his deep interdisciplinary work.

Elliot held visiting and adjunct professor positions at the Pacific Lutheran Theological Seminary (1976, 1983), Graduate Theological Union (1977), University of Notre Dame (1981), University of Pretoria (1991), and the University of Bologna (2001). Additionally, he was the first Lutheran to serve as the Catholic Biblical Association of America Visiting professor at the Pontifical Biblical Institute.

Elliot was a strong union supporter, and he played a significant role in the struggle to unionize faculty at the University of San Francisco, a process that led to the creation of the University of San Francisco Faculty Association in 1975.

He also played a key role in the University Lutheran Chapel Sanctuary's participation in the Sanctuary movement.

== Scholarship ==
Elliott is the author of numerous books, articles and reviews. He is regarded as a pioneer of the social-scientific method in biblical studies and an expert in 1 Peter. His major works include:

- The Elect and the Holy: An Exegetical Examination of 1 Peter 2:4-10 and the Phrase basileion hierateuma: Supplements to Novum Testamentum 12. Leiden: Brill, 1966; reprinted, Eugene, OR: Wipf & Stock, 2006.
- Doxology: God's People Called to Celebrate His Glory. St. Louis, 1966.
- The Christ-Life: Jesus Christ the Sacrament and Sacramental Living. Chicago, 1968.
- Proclamation: Aids for Interpreting the Lessons of the Church Year. Series A. Pentecost 3. Co-authored with Bruce Vawter. Philadelphia: Fortress, 1975.
- 1 Peter: Estrangement and Community. Herald Biblical Booklets. Chicago: Franciscan Herald Press, 1979.
- A Home for the Homeless: A Sociological Exegesis of 1 Peter, Its Situation and Strategy. Philadelphia: Fortress, 1981 (translated into Portuguese and Spanish). 2nd ed. Minneapolis: Fortress, 1990; reprint, Eugene, OR: Wipf & Stock, 2005.
- I-II Peter/Jude in: Ralph A. Martin and John H. Elliott, James, I-II Peter/Jude. Augsburg Commentary on the New Testament. Minneapolis: Augsburg, 1982.
- Social-Scientific Criticism of the New Testament and Its Social World. (editor) Semeia 35. Decatur, GA: Scholars Press, 1986.* What Is Social-Scientific Criticism? Guides to Biblical Scholarship. Minneapolis: Fortress, 1993; published in Great Britain as Social-Scientific Criticism of the New Testament. An Introduction. London: SPCK, 1995.
- 1 Peter: A New Translation with Introduction and Commentary. Anchor Bible 37B. New York: Doubleday/Random House, 2000.
- Conflict, Community, and Honor: 1 Peter in Social-Scientific Perspective. Cascade Companions. Eugene, OR: Cascade Books, 2007.
- Beware the Evil Eye: The Evil Eye in the Bible and the Ancient World. 4 vols. Eugene, OR: Cascade Books, 2015–2017.
