= Jean Simmons =

British actress (1929–2010)

Jean Simmons OBE
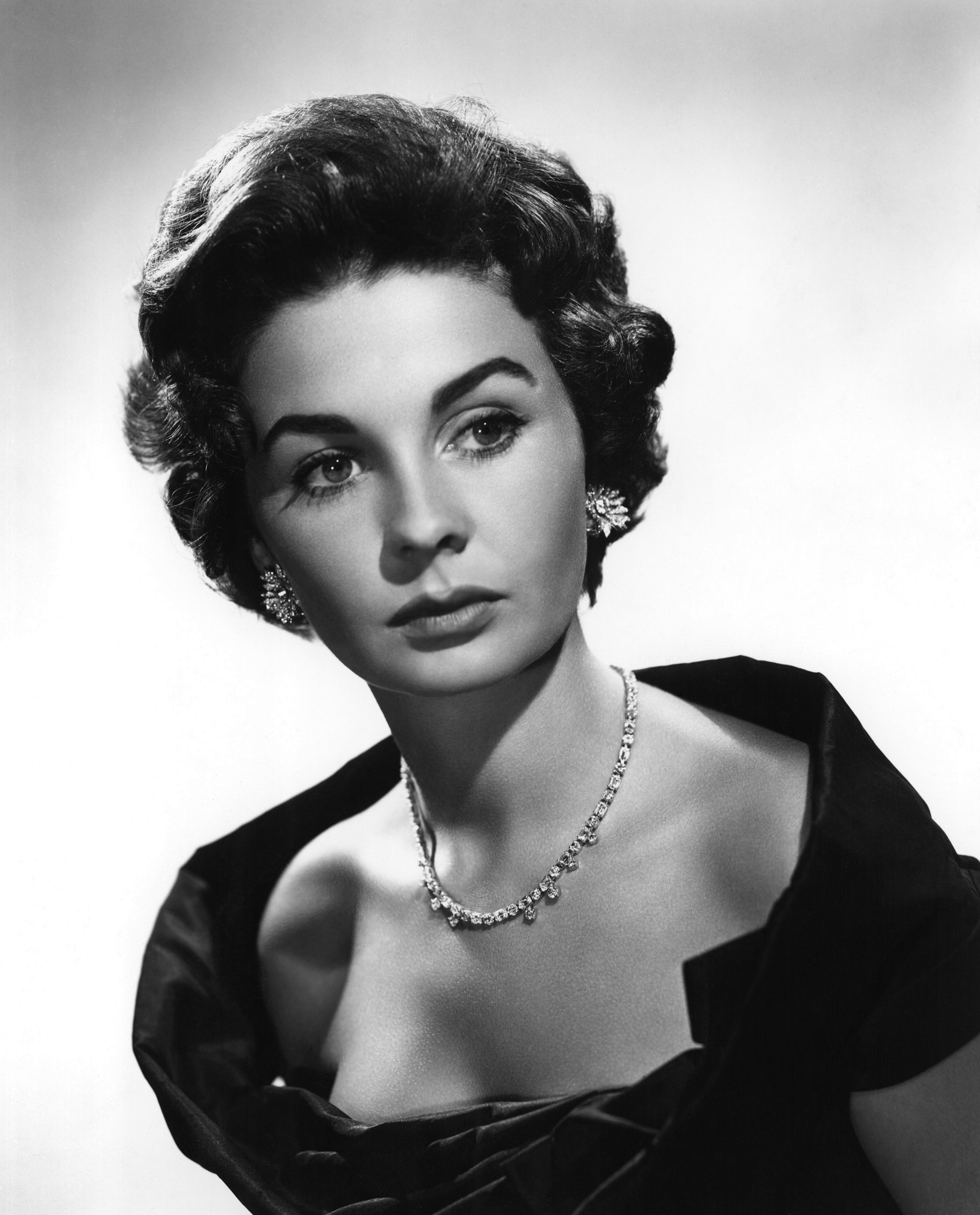
- Simmons in a 1955 studio publicity shot
- Born: Jean Merilyn Simmons; 31 January 1929; Islington, London, England
- Died: 22 January 2010 (aged 80); Santa Monica, California, US
- Resting place: Highgate Cemetery
- Citizenship: United Kingdom; United States (from 1956)
- Occupations: Actress, singer
- Years active: 1944–2010
- Spouses: Stewart Granger (m. 1950; div. 1960) Richard Brooks (m. 1960; div. 1980)
- Children: 2
- Father: Charles Simmons

Jean Merilyn Simmons (31 January 1929 – 22 January 2010) was a British actress and singer. One of J. Arthur Rank's "well-spoken young starlets", she appeared predominantly in films, beginning with those made in Britain during and after the Second World War, followed mainly by Hollywood films from 1950 onwards.

Simmons was nominated for the Academy Award for Best Supporting Actress for Hamlet (1948), and won a Golden Globe Award for Best Actress for Guys and Dolls (1955). Among her other films were Great Expectations (1946), Black Narcissus (1947), The Blue Lagoon (1949), So Long at the Fair (1950), Angel Face (1953), Young Bess (1953), The Robe (1953), The Big Country (1958), Elmer Gantry (1960), Spartacus (1960), and The Happy Ending (1969), for which she was nominated for the Academy Award for Best Actress. She also won an Emmy Award for the miniseries The Thorn Birds (1983).

== Early life ==
Simmons was born on 31 January 1929, in Islington, London, to Charles Simmons, a physical education teacher, and his wife, Winifred Ada (née Loveland). Jean was the youngest of four children, with siblings Lorna, Harold, and Edna. She began acting at the age of 14.

During the Second World War, the Simmons family was evacuated to Winscombe, Somerset. Her father, a bronze medalist in gymnastics at the 1912 Summer Olympics, taught briefly at Sidcot School, and sometime during this period, Simmons followed her eldest sister onto the village stage and sang popular songs such as "Daddy Wouldn't Buy Me a Bow Wow". At this point, her ambition was to be an acrobatic dancer.

== Career ==
=== Early films ===
On her return to London from Somerset, Simmons enrolled at the Aida Foster School of Dance. She was spotted by director Val Guest, who cast her in a large role as Margaret Lockwood's sister in Give Us the Moon (1944). Small roles in several other films followed, including Mr. Emmanuel (1944), Kiss the Bride Goodbye (1945), Meet Sexton Blake! (1945), and the popular The Way to the Stars (1945), as well as the short Sports Day (1945).

Simmons had a small part as a harpist in the high-profile Caesar and Cleopatra (1945), produced by Gabriel Pascal, starring Vivien Leigh, and co-starring Simmons's future husband Stewart Granger.

=== Stardom ===
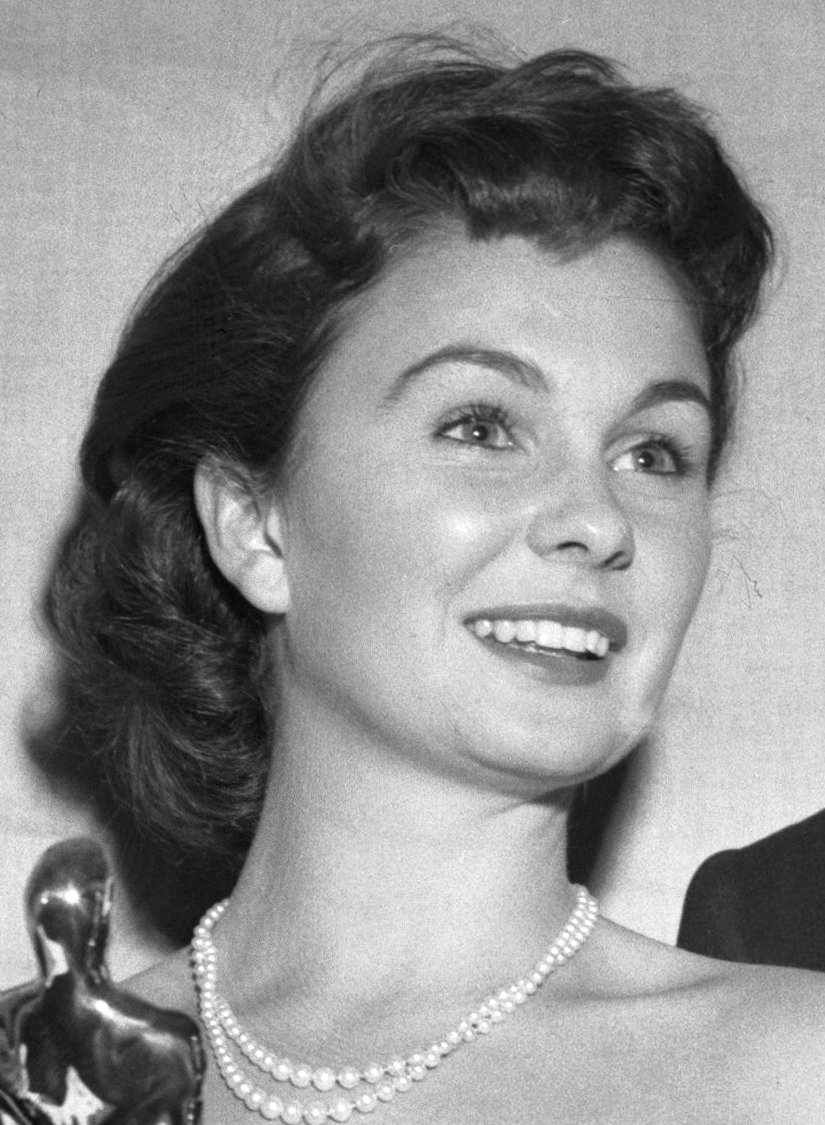
Simmons at the 1948 Academy Awards, where she received her first Oscar nomination

Simmons was cast as the young Estella in David Lean's version of Great Expectations (1946). The film was the third-most-popular at the British box office in 1947, Simmons received excellent reviews, and achieved stardom in the UK.

The experience of working on Great Expectations caused her to pursue an acting career more seriously:

I thought acting was just a lark, meeting all those exciting movie stars, and getting £5 a day which was lovely because we needed the money. But I figured I'd just go off and get married and have children like my mother. It was working with David Lean that convinced me to go on.

Simmons had support roles in Hungry Hill (1947) with Margaret Lockwood and the Powell-Pressburger film Black Narcissus (1947), playing an Indian woman in the latter alongside Sabu.

Simmons was top-billed for the first time in the drama Uncle Silas (1947). She followed it with The Woman in the Hall (1947). Neither was particularly successful, but Simmons was then in a huge international hit, playing Ophelia in Laurence Olivier's Hamlet (1948), for which she received her first Oscar nomination. Olivier offered her the chance to work and study at the Old Vic, advising her to play anything they offered her to get experience, but she was under contract to the J. Arthur Rank Organisation, which vetoed the idea.

Simmons had the lead in Frank Launder's The Blue Lagoon (1949), based on the 1908 novel by Henry De Vere Stacpoole and co-produced with Launder's partner Sidney Gilliat, a project originally announced for Lockwood a decade earlier. It was a considerable financial success.

Simmons starred with Stewart Granger in the comedy Adam and Evelyne (1949). It was her first adult role, and Granger and she became romantically involved; they soon married.

Simmons made two films that were popular at the local box office: So Long at the Fair (1950) with Dirk Bogarde and Trio (1950), where she was one of several stars. She was then in Cage of Gold (1950) with David Farrar and Ralph Thomas and The Clouded Yellow (1950) with Trevor Howard. In 1950, Simmons was voted the fourth-most popular star in Britain.

=== Hollywood ===
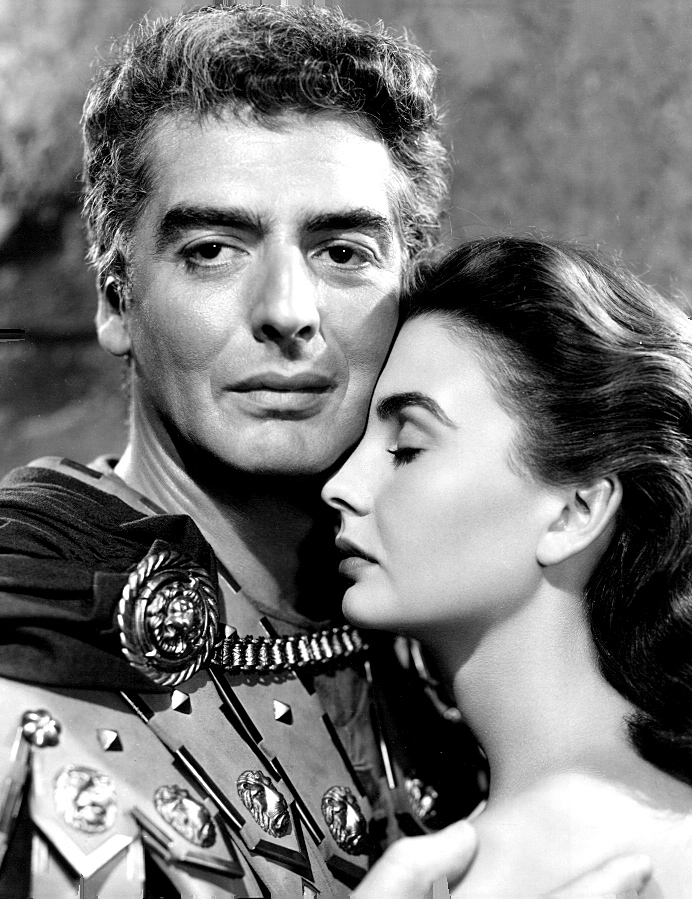
Simmons with Victor Mature in Androcles and the Lion (1952)

Granger became a Hollywood star in King Solomon's Mines (1950) and was signed to a contract by MGM, so Simmons moved to Los Angeles with him. In 1951, Rank sold her contract to Howard Hughes, who then owned RKO Pictures.

Hughes was eager to start a sexual relationship with Simmons, but Granger put a stop to his advances by angrily telling Hughes over the phone: "Mr. Howard bloody Hughes, you'll be sorry if you don't leave my wife alone."

Her first Hollywood film was Androcles and the Lion (1952), produced by Pascal and co-starring Victor Mature. It was followed by Angel Face (1953), directed by Otto Preminger with Robert Mitchum. David Thomson wrote that "if she had made only one film – Angel Face – she might now be spoken of with the awe given to Louise Brooks." Smarting over his rebuff from Granger, Hughes instructed Preminger to treat Simmons as roughly as possible, leading the director to demand that costar Mitchum repeatedly slap the actress harder and harder, until Mitchum turned and punched Preminger, asking if that was how he wanted it. He also made her appear in She Couldn't Say No (1954), a comedy with Mitchum.

A court case freed Simmons from the contract with Hughes in 1952. They settled out of court; part of the arrangement was that Simmons would do one more film for no additional money. Simmons also agreed to make three more movies under the auspices of RKO, but not actually at that studio—she would be lent out. She would make an additional picture for 20th Century Fox while RKO got the services of Victor Mature for one film.

Simmons and Granger returned to England to make the thriller Footsteps in the Fog (1955). Then, Joseph Mankiewicz cast her opposite Marlon Brando in the screen adaptation of Guys and Dolls (1955), where she did her own singing in a role turned down by Grace Kelly; it was a big hit.

So, too, were This Could Be the Night (1957) and Until They Sail (1957), both at MGM.

The Big Country (1958), directed by William Wyler, was a great success for Simmons. She starred in Home Before Dark (1958) at Warner Bros. and This Earth Is Mine (1959) with Rock Hudson at Universal. In the opinion of film critic Philip French, Home Before Dark was "perhaps her finest performance as a housewife driven into a breakdown in Mervyn LeRoy's psychodrama."

Simmons went into Elmer Gantry (1960), directed by Richard Brooks, who became her second husband. It was successful, as was Spartacus (1960), where she played Kirk Douglas's character's love interest. Simmons then did The Grass Is Greener (1960) with Mitchum, Cary Grant, and Deborah Kerr.

She took some years off screen, then returned in All the Way Home (1963) with Robert Preston. She did Life at the Top (1965) with Laurence Harvey, Mister Buddwing (1966) with James Garner, Divorce American Style (1967) with Dick Van Dyke, and Rough Night in Jericho (1967) with George Peppard and Dean Martin.

=== 1970s and 1980s ===
By the 1970s, Simmons turned her focus to stage and television acting. She toured the United States in Stephen Sondheim's A Little Night Music, then took the show to London, thus originating the role of Desirée Armfeldt in the West End. Performing in the show for three years, she said she never tired of Sondheim's music; "No matter how tired or 'off' you felt, the music would just pick you up."

She portrayed Fiona "Fee" Cleary, the Cleary family matriarch, in the miniseries The Thorn Birds (1983); she won an Emmy Award for her role. She appeared in North and South (1985–86), again playing the role of the family matriarch as Clarissa Main, and starred in The Dawning (1988) with Anthony Hopkins and Hugh Grant. In 1989, Simmons appeared as murder mystery author Eudora McVeigh Shipton, a self-proclaimed rival to Jessica Fletcher, in the two-part Murder, She Wrote episode "Mirror, Mirror, On the Wall" with Angela Lansbury.

=== 1990s and 2000s ===
In 1989, she starred in a remake of Great Expectations, this time playing the role of Miss Havisham, Estella's adoptive mother. In 1991, she appeared in the Star Trek: The Next Generation episode "The Drumhead" as a retired Starfleet admiral and hardened legal investigator who conducts a witch hunt; and as Elizabeth Collins Stoddard/Naomi Collins, in the short-lived revival of the 1960s daytime series Dark Shadows, in roles originally played by Joan Bennett. From 1994 until 1998, Simmons narrated the A&E documentary television series Mysteries of the Bible. In 1995, she appeared in How to Make an American Quilt with Winona Ryder, Maya Angelou, Ellen Burstyn, Anne Bancroft, and Alfre Woodard. In 2004, she voiced the lead role of Sophie in the English dub of Howl's Moving Castle.

== Personal life ==
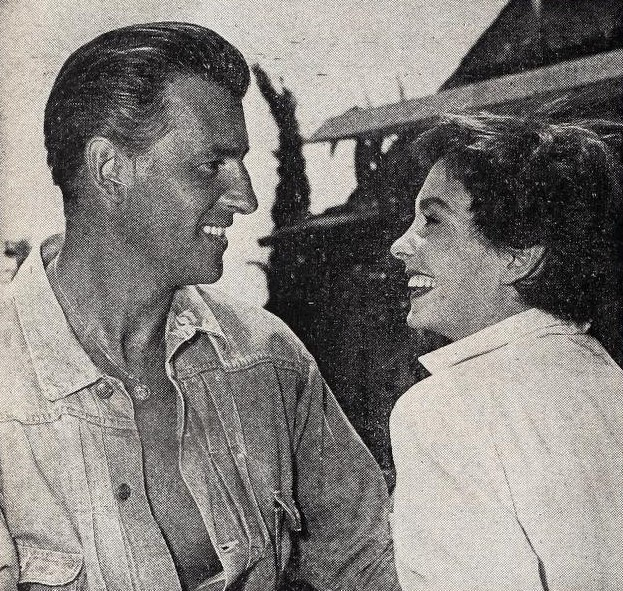
Simmons with her first husband Stewart Granger in 1955

Simmons was married and divorced twice. At 21, she married Stewart Granger in Tucson, Arizona, on 20 December 1950. She and Granger became US citizens in 1956 and in the same year, their daughter Tracy Granger was born. They divorced in 1960.

On 1 November 1960, Simmons married director Richard Brooks; their daughter, Kate Brooks, was born a year later. Simmons and Brooks divorced in 1980. Although both men were significantly older than she, Simmons denied that she was looking for a father figure. Her father died when she was 16 years-old, but regarding her choice of husbands she said:

They were really nothing like my father at all. My father was a gentle, softly spoken man. My husbands were both much noisier and much more opinionated... it's really nothing to do with age ... it's to do with what's there – the twinkle and sense of humour.

In a 1984 interview, given in Copenhagen at the time she was shooting the film Going Undercover (1988, a.k.a. Yellow Pages; completed 1985) she elaborated slightly on her marriages, stating,

It may be simplistic, but you could sum up my two marriages by saying that, when I wanted to be a wife, Jimmy [Stewart Granger] would say: "I just want you to be pretty." And when I wanted to cook, Richard would say: "Forget the cooking. You've been trained to act – so act!" Most people thought I was quite helpless – a clinger and a butterfly – during my first marriage. It was Richard Brooks who saw what was wrong and tried to make me stand on my own two feet. I'd whine: 'I'm afraid.' And he'd say: 'Never be afraid to fail. Every time you get up in the morning, you are ahead.'

Simmons had two daughters, Tracy Granger and Kate Brooks, one by each marriage. Tracy's name reflects her friendship with Spencer Tracy; Tracy became a film editor, and Kate a TV production assistant and producer.

In the 2003 New Year Honours, Simmons was appointed an Officer of the Order of the British Empire (OBE) for services to acting.

In 2003, she became the patron of the British drugs and human rights charity Release. In 2005, she signed a petition to British Prime Minister Tony Blair asking him not to upgrade cannabis from a class C drug to class B.

== Illness and death ==
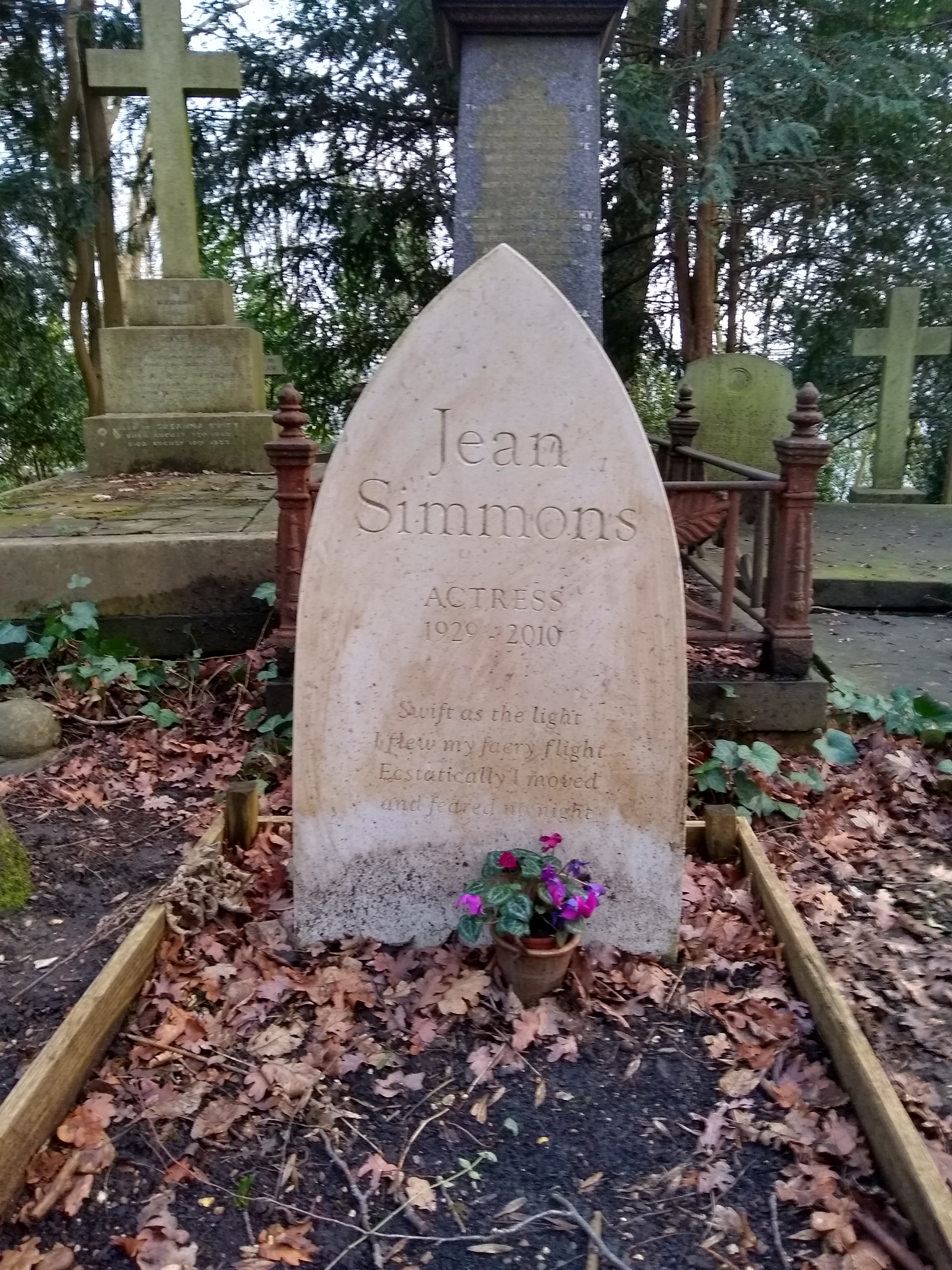
Grave of Jean Simmons in Highgate Cemetery, London

Simmons, aged 80, died from lung cancer at her home in Santa Monica on 22 January 2010. She was interred in Highgate Cemetery, north London.

== Filmography ==
Year	Film	Role	Notes
1944	Give Us the Moon	Heidi	
1944	Mr. Emmanuel	Sally Cooper	Billed as Jean Simmonds
1944	Sports Day	Peggy	
1945	Kiss the Bride Goodbye	Molly Dodd	
1945	Meet Sexton Blake!	Eva Watkins	
1945	The Way to the Stars	A singer	
1945	Caesar and Cleopatra	Harpist	Uncredited
1946	Great Expectations	Estella as a girl	
1947	Hungry Hill	Jane Brodrick	
1947	Black Narcissus	Kanchi	
1947	Uncle Silas	Caroline Ruthyn	
1947	The Woman in the Hall	Jay Blake	
1948	Hamlet	Ophelia	Volpi Cup for Best Actress; Nominated — Academy Award for Best Supporting Actress
1949	Adam and Evelyne	Evelyne Kirby	
1949	The Blue Lagoon	Emmeline Foster	
1950	So Long at the Fair	Vicky Barton	Bambi Award for Best Actress – International (2nd place)
1950	Trio	Evie Bishop	Segment "Sanatorium"; Bambi Award for Best Actress – International (2nd place)
1950	Cage of Gold	Judith Moray	
1950	The Clouded Yellow	Sophie Malraux	
1952	Androcles and the Lion	Lavinia	
1953	Angel Face	Diane Tremayne Jessup	
1953	Young Bess	Princess Elizabeth	National Board of Review Award for Best Actress (also for The Robe and The Actress)
1953	Affair with a Stranger	Carolyn Parker	
1953	The Robe	Diana	National Board of Review Award for Best Actress (also for Young Bess and The Actress)
1953	The Actress	Ruth Gordon Jones	National Board of Review Award for Best Actress (also for Young Bess and The Robe)
1954	She Couldn't Say No	Corby Lane	AKA Beautiful but Dangerous
1954	The Egyptian	Meryt	
1954	A Bullet Is Waiting	Cally Canham	
1954	Désirée	Désirée Clary	
1954	Demetrius and the Gladiators	Diana	Appeared in a clip from The Robe
1955	Footsteps in the Fog	Lily Watkins	
1955	Guys and Dolls	Sergeant Sarah Brown	Golden Globe Award for Best Actress – Motion Picture Musical or Comedy; Nominated – BAFTA Award for Best Foreign Actress
1956	Hilda Crane	Hilda Crane Burns	
1957	This Could Be the Night	Anne Leeds	Nominated – Golden Globe Award for Best Actress – Motion Picture Musical or Comedy
1957	Until They Sail	Barbara Leslie Forbes	
1958	The Big Country	Julie Maragon	
1958	Home Before Dark	Charlotte Bronn	Laurel Award for Top Female Dramatic Performance (4th place); Nominated – Golden Globe Award for Best Actress – Motion Picture Drama
1959	This Earth Is Mine	Elizabeth Rambeau	
1960	Elmer Gantry	Sharon Falconer	Laurel Award for Top Female Dramatic Performance (3rd place); Nominated – BAFTA Award for Best Foreign Actress; Nominated – Golden Globe Award for Best Actress – Motion Picture Drama
1960	Spartacus	Varinia	
1960	The Grass Is Greener	Hattie Durant	Laurel Award for Top Female Comedy Performance (5th place)
1963	All the Way Home	Mary Follett	
1965	Life at the Top	Susan Lampton	
1966	Mister Buddwing	The Blonde	
1967	Divorce American Style	Nancy Downes	
1967	Rough Night in Jericho	Molly Lang	
1968	Heidi	Fräulein Rottenmeier	TV
1969	The Happy Ending	Mary Wilson	Nominated – Academy Award for Best Actress; Nominated – Golden Globe Award for Best Actress – Motion Picture Drama
1971	Say Hello to Yesterday	Woman	
1972	The Odd Couple	Princess Lydia	Episode: "The Princess"
1975	Mr. Sycamore	Estelle Benbow	
1975	The Easter Promise	Constance Payne	TV
1977	Hawaii Five-O	Terri O'Brien	TV; Episode "A Cop on the Cover"
1978	The Dain Curse	Aaronia Haldorn	TV
1978	Dominique	Dominique Ballard	
1979	Beggarman, Thief	Gretchen Jordache Burke	TV
1981	A Small Killing	Margaret Lawrence	TV
1981	Golden Gate	Jane Kingsley	TV
1981	Jacqueline Susann's Valley of the Dolls	Helen Lawson	TV
1983	The Thorn Birds	Fee Cleary	TV; Primetime Emmy Award for Outstanding Supporting Actress in a Miniseries or a Movie; Nominated – Golden Globe Award for Best Supporting Actress – Series, Miniseries or Television Film
1984	December Flower	Etta Marsh	TV
1984	All for Love	Deidre Mackay	Episode: "Down at the Hydro"
1985	Midas Valley	Molly Hammond	TV
1985	North and South	Clarissa Gault Main	TV
1986	North and South Book II	Clarissa Gault Main	TV
1987	Perry Mason: The Case of the Lost Love	Laura Robertson	TV
1988	Inherit the Wind	Lucy Brady	TV
1988	The Dawning	Aunt Mary	
1988	Going Undercover	Maxine de la Hunt	Released as Going Undercover in the US in 1988. Straight to video in the UK as Yellow Pages (completed 1985).
1989	Great Expectations	Miss Havisham	TV
1989	Murder, She Wrote	Eudora McVeigh Shipton	Episode: "Mirror, Mirror on the Wall"; Nominated – Primetime Emmy Award for Outstanding Guest Actress in a Drama Series
1991	Star Trek: The Next Generation	Rear Admiral Norah Satie	Episode: "The Drumhead"
1991	Dark Shadows	Elizabeth Collins Stoddard Naomi Collins	
1991	They Do It with Mirrors	Carrie-Louise Serrocold	TV; Miss Marple (TV series)
1994	In the Heat of the Night	Miss Cordelia	TV; Episode: "Ches and the Grand Lady"
1994–1998	Mysteries of the Bible	Narrator	
1995	How to Make an American Quilt	Em Reed	Nominated – Screen Actors Guild Award for Outstanding Performance by a Cast in a Motion Picture
1995	Daisies in December	Katherine Palmer	
2001	Final Fantasy: The Spirits Within	Council Member 2	Voice
2003	Winter Solstice	Countess Lucinda Rhives	Released in Germany as Wintersonne
2004	Jean Simmons: Rose of England	Herself	
2004	Howl's Moving Castle	Old Sophie	Voice, English version
2005	Thru the Moebius Strip	Shepway	Voice
2009	Shadows in the Sun	Hannah	Final film role

== Box office ranking ==
For a number of years, British film exhibitors voted Simmons among the top ten British stars at the box office via an annual poll in the Motion Picture Herald.

- 1949 – 4th (9th most popular overall)
- 1950 – 2nd (4th most popular overall)
- 1951 – 3rd

== Awards and nominations ==
Year	Association	Category	Nominated work	Result
1949	Academy Awards	Best Supporting Actress	Hamlet	Nominated
1950	Daily Mail National Film Awards	Most Outstanding British Actress of the Year		Won
1953	National Board of Review	Best Actress	The Actress / The Robe / Young Bess	Won
1956	Golden Globe Awards	Best Actress – Motion Picture Musical or Comedy	Guys and Dolls	Won
1957	BAFTA Awards	Best Foreign Actress	Guys and Dolls	Nominated
1958	Golden Globe Awards	Best Actress – Motion Picture Musical or Comedy	This Could Be the Night	Nominated
1959	Golden Globe Awards	Best Actress – Motion Picture Drama	Home Before Dark	Nominated
1961	BAFTA Awards	Best Foreign Actress	Elmer Gantry	Nominated
1961	Golden Globe Awards	Best Actress – Motion Picture Drama	Elmer Gantry	Nominated
1970	Academy Awards	Best Actress	The Happy Ending	Nominated
1970	Golden Globe Awards	Best Actress – Motion Picture Drama	The Happy Ending	Nominated
1983	Primetime Emmy Awards	Outstanding Supporting Actress in a Limited Series or a Special	The Thorn Birds	Won
1984	Golden Globe Awards	Best Supporting Actress – Series, Miniseries or Television	The Thorn Birds	Nominated
1989	Primetime Emmy Awards	Outstanding Guest Actress in a Drama Series	Murder, She Wrote	Nominated
1996	Screen Actors Guild Awards	Outstanding Performance by a Cast in a Motion Picture	How to Make an American Quilt	Nominated

== See also ==
- List of British actors
- List of Academy Award winners and nominees from Great Britain
- List of actors with Academy Award nominations
- List of Golden Globe winners

== Bibliography ==
- Capua, Michelangelo (2022). Jean Simmons: Her Life and Career. Jefferson, North Carolina: McFarland & Company. ISBN 978-1-4766-8224-2.
- Daniel, Douglass K. (2011). Tough as Nails: The Life and Films of Richard Brooks. Madison, WI: University of Wisconsin Press. pp. 66, 141, 233. ISBN 978-0299251239.
