= The Context Group =

Biblical scholars

The Context Group is a working group of international biblical scholars who promote research into the Bible using social-scientific methods such as anthropology and sociology.

== Founding ==
The Context Group is an international team of scholars that merges historical exegesis and the social sciences to interpret the Bible in its social and cultural contexts. It initially organized in 1986 as the "Social Facets Seminar," headed by John H. Elliott as chair, meeting in conjunction with the Jesus Seminar under the direction of Robert W. Funk and the Westar Institute. In 1989 it broke ties with the Jesus Seminar and reorganized in Portland, Oregon, as The Context Group, A Project on the Bible in its Social and Cultural Environment.

Two seminal publications by founding members were Bruce J. Malina's The New Testament World: Insights from Cultural Anthropology (1981) and John H. Elliott's Home for the Homeless: A Sociological Exegesis of 1 Peter (1981). Elliott's What is Social-Scientific Criticism of the Bible? (1993) coined a new term for the group's methodology and provided a bibliographic survey. Other key figures who published on the subject during this era (all of whom eventually became part of the Context Group) include Dennis Duling, Philip Esler, Douglas E. Oakman, Jerome Neyrey SJ, John J. Pilch, Richard L. Rohrbaugh, and Wolfgang Stegemann.

The work of the group has had considerable influence in the field, but also has attracted a variety of criticisms.

== Main ideas ==
At the root of the Context Group's social-scientific method is the belief that biblical scholars have taken western cultural assumptions for granted when interpreting biblical texts, which are ancient documents produced in a much different culture.

The key difference is that the modern western world is an individualistic, industrial society, whereas the society of the ancient Mediterranean world was collectivistic and agrarian.

The ancient Mediterranean was also a high-context society, where discourse took shared cultural values for granted. This contrasts with the modern western world, which is a low-context society in which discourse tends to be more specific and specialized (i.e. to particular groups, subcultures, etc.). According to the Context scholars, the interpreter must learn the cultural assumptions and values behind the text in order to understand it correctly. This involves understanding values such as honor and shame, for example, which Malina calls "pivotal cultural values."

Other common themes in Context analysis of the Bible include patron-client relationships, the "evil eye", kinship, purity codes, and dyadic/group-oriented personalities.

== Context scholars and publications ==
The Context Group's founding and early members include important scholars in the field today: John H. Elliott, Bruce J. Malina, Philip Esler, Jerome H. Neyrey SJ, John J. Pilch, Wolfgang Stegemann, K.C. Hanson, Douglas E. Oakman, Dennis C. Duling, S. Scott Bartchy and Richard L. Rohrbaugh.

Important publications include the following:

- Craffert, Pieter F. The Life of a Galilean Shaman: Jesus of Nazareth in Anthropological-Historical Perspective. Matrix. Eugene, OR: Cascade Books, 2008.
- Crook, Zeba A. Reconceptualising Conversion: Patronage, Loyalty, and Conversion in the Religions of the Ancient Mediterranean. BZNW 130; Berlin: Walter de Gruyter, 2004.
- DeMaris, Richard E., The New Testament in Its Ritual World. London: Routledge, 2008.
- DeMaris, Richard E., Jason T. Lamoreaux, and Steven C. Muir, eds. Early Christian Ritual Life. London: Routledge.
- Duling, Dennis C. The New Testament: History, Literature, and Social Context. Belmont, CA: Wadsworth, 2003.
- Elliott, John H., editor. Social-Scientific Criticism of the New Testament and Its Social World. Semeia 35 (1986).
- ——— (1993), What Is Social-Scientific Criticism?, Guides to Biblical Scholarship, Minneapolis: Fortress Press.
- ——— (2006), A Home for the Homeless (reprint) (2d ed.), Eugene, OR: Wipf & Stock.
- ——— (2007), Conflict, Community, and Honor: 1 Peter in Social-Scientific Perspective, Cascade Companions, Eugene, OR: Cascade Books.
- Esler, Philip F. Conflict and Identity in Romans: The Social Setting of Paul's Letter. Minneapolis: Fortress Press, 2003.
- ——— (2005), New Testament Theology: Community and Communion, Minneapolis: Fortress Press.
- Esler, Philip F., editor. Ancient Israel: The Old Testament in Its Social Context. Minneapolis: Fortress Press, 2006.
- Hanson, K. C., and Douglas E. Oakman, Palestine in the Time of Jesus. Minneapolis: Fortress Press, 1998; 2d ed., 2008.
- Malina, Bruce J. The New Testament World: Insights from Cultural Anthropology. 3d ed. Louisville: Westminster John Knox, 2001.
- ———; Neyrey, Jerome H (1996), Portraits of Paul: An Archaeology of Ancient Personality, Louisville: John Knox Press.
- ———; Pilch, John J (2000), Social-Science Commentary on the Book of Revelation, Minneapolis: Fortress Press.
- ———; Rohrbaugh, Richard L. (1998), Social-Science Commentary on the Gospel of John, Minneapolis: Fortress Press.
- ———; Rohrbaugh, Richard L. (2003), Social-Science Commentary on the Synoptic Gospels (2d ed.), Minneapolis: Fortress Press.
- Neufeld, Dietmar. "The Social Sciences and Biblical Translation." Symposium Series 41. Atlanta/Leiden: Society of Biblical Literature, 2008.
- Neyrey, Jerome H. Paul, in Other Words: A Cultural Reading of His Letters. Louisville: John Knox Press, 1990.
- Neyrey, Jerome H. Render to God: New Testament Understandings of the Divine. Minneapolis: Fortress Press, 2004.
- Neyrey, Jerome H., editor. The Social World of Luke-Acts: Models for Interpretation. Peabody: Hendrickson, 1991.
- Oakman, Douglas E. Jesus and the Peasants. Matrix. Eugene, OR: Cascade Books, 2008.
- Oakman, Douglas E. The Political Aims of Jesus. Minneapolis: Fortress Pres, 2012.
- Oakman, Douglas E. Jesus, Debt, and the Lord's Prayer: First-Century Debt and Jesus' Intentions. Eugene, OR: Cascade Books, 2014.
- Oakman, Douglas E. The Radical Jesus, the Bible, and the Great Transformation. Matrix. Eugene, OR: Cascade Books, 2021.
- Pilch, John J., editor. Social Scientific Models for Interpreting the Bible. Biblical Interpretation Series 53. Leiden: Brill, 2001.
- Pilch, John J. & Bruce J. Malina, editors. A Handbook of Biblical Social Values. Peabody: Hendrickson, 1998.
- Rohrbaugh, Richard L. The New Testament in Cross-Cultural Perspective. Matrix. Eugene, OR: Cascade, 2007.
- Rohrbaugh, Richard L., editor. The Social Sciences and New Testament Interpretation. Peabody, MA: Hendrickson, 1996.
- Stegemann, Ekkehard S., and Wolfgang Stegemann. The Jesus Movement: A Social History of Its First Century. Translated by O. C. Dean Jr. Minneapolis: Fortress Press, 1999.
- Stewart, Eric C., "Gathered around Jesus : An Alternative Spatial Practice in the Gospel of Mark". Eugene, Or. : Cascade Books, 2009.
