= S. Scott Bartchy =

American biblical scholar

- Born: November 9, 1936 (age 89); Canton, Ohio
- Occupation: Biblical scholar
- Title: Emeritus Professor of Christian Origins and the History of Religion
- Board member of: The Context Group, Academy of Judaic, Christian, and Islamic Studies

Academic background
- Education: Milligan College, Harvard Divinity School, Harvard University

Academic work
- Discipline: New Testament studies
- Institutions: University of California, Los Angeles

S. Scott Bartchy (born 9 November 1936 in Canton, Ohio) is a New Testament scholar and member of The Context Group, a group of biblical scholars committed to using social-scientific interpretative methods. He is also a member of The Society of Biblical Literature, the Catholic Biblical Association, and the Studiorum Novi Testamenti Societas (Society of New Testament Studies). Bartchy is Emeritus Professor of Christian Origins and the History of Religion in the Department of History, University of California, Los Angeles, where he taught from 1981 until his retirement in 2013. At UCLA, Bartchy was integral to the founding of the Center for the Study of Religion and served as its director for many years. Under his leadership, the Center began offering UCLA's first undergraduate major in religious studies.

== Biography ==
Bartchy attended Milligan College in the 1950s, where he majored in social science and religious studies and minored in Hellenistic Greek. Bartchy states that it was at this liberal-arts Christian school in east Tennessee where he had a religious awakening. He retells an account of preaching at a local church while attending Milligan:

I had some great teachers that one year and I was preaching at a church full of farmers, mostly, in the early sixties when the Cold War had really set in. People were holding Christ Against Communism Crusades and things like this. So, the elders in my church asked me if I would preach a sermon against communism. I was still idealistic enough that I thought I'd rather preach for something rather than against something so I literally stumbled over Matthew 25. I had never paid much attention to it before. I had never heard a sermon on it. I had gone to church-related undergraduate schools and had never heard of this passage before. So, I decided to preach on that text and the elders and the rest of the people came to me and said they had no idea that was in the Bible. I never did preach that sermon against communism.

Bartchy graduated Milligan College in 1958 cum laude with a Bachelor of Arts. Not long after his time at Milligan, he was ordained to teaching ministry in the First Christian Church, Canton, Ohio (December 1959).

He earned his Bachelor of Theological Knowledge (M.Div. equivalent) at Harvard Divinity School (1963) and his Ph.D. in New Testament at Harvard University (1971). His advisors while at Harvard were Helmut Koester, Krister Stendahl, Glen Bowersock, and John Strugnell. Among other notable New Testament scholars, he attended Harvard with the late David M. Scholer of Fuller Theological Seminary, with whom he remained a close friend for several decades.

In the late 1960s and the 1970s, Bartchy taught in the internationally renowned theological faculty of the University of Tübingen, Germany, and directed the Institut zur Erforschung des Urchristentums there. Bartchy also taught New Testament studies at Emmanuel School of Religion (now Emmanuel Christian Seminary, and later joined the efforts of the Westwood Christian Foundation in establishing a resident New Testament scholar at UCLA:

Following accepted academic search procedures, the Department of History appointed the foundation's resident New Testament scholar, S. Scott Bartchy, to teach such a class. Student and faculty response was positive. When the university expressed the desire to repeat the class the following year, the foundation once again made a grant to the university to cover the professor's salary. From those early beginnings a unique partnership developed. The curriculum in early Christianity grew apace, developing into a major — all of which the Westwood Christian Foundation funded. In 1990 UCLA undertook steps to establish a fully funded Chair in Early Christian History in the Department of History. After a significant international search, Bartchy was chosen from among a number of eminent finalists.

Bartchy's courses on Christian origins have consistently remained popular choices among upper division undergraduate students, enrolling well over 100 students each time it is offered. Bartchy has also spearheaded a graduate program in Christian origins.

Bartchy is also a current board member of the Academy of Judaic, Christian, and Islamic Studies.

Bartchy is also a professional jazz pianist, playing with The Scott Bartchy Quartet. He has also been noted for his commitment to renewable energy, particularly in the building of his "earthship" home in Southern California.

== Contribution to scholarship ==
Bartchy is well-known and widely cited for his published dissertation on the role of slavery in early Christianity, specifically dealing with 1 Corinthians 7:21. In this work, Bartchy contradicts many English translations of the Greek κλῆσις and maintains that it does not refer to "condition" or "station in life," but rather to Paul's "theology of calling." He seeks to argue against those who believe Paul was a social conservative, imploring slaves to remain in their position. Instead, Bartchy suggests the following translation of 1 Corinthians 7:17-24:

In any case let each one live his life in accord with the fact that the Lord has distributed [faith] to him and that God has called him. That is what I teach in all our congregations. Was a man already circumcised when he was called? He should not try to change his condition with an operation. Was a man uncircumcised when he was called? He should not become circumcised. Neither circumcision nor uncircumcision makes any difference. But keeping the commands of God is what really counts. Each person should continue in that calling into which he was called. Were you a slave when you were called? Don't worry about it. But if, indeed, you become manumitted, by all means [as a freedman] live according to [God's calling.] For a slave who has been called in the Lord is the Lord's freedman. Likewise, a freeman who has been called [in the Lord] is Christ's slave. You were bought with a price: do not become slaves of men. Each one should continue to live in accord with his calling [in Christ]--in the sight of God.

More recently, Bartchy has focused his attention particularly upon gender roles and ancient patriarchy. His research in this area will be further published in his forthcoming work, Call No Man Father.

Bartchy's former doctoral advisees from UCLA include Rick Talbot (Associate Professor of and Department Chair for Religious Studies at CSUN) and Joseph H. Hellerman (Professor of New Testament Language and Literature at Biola University). Both of these former students bear marks of Scott Bartchy in their work through social history within Christian origins, particularly in family and gender issues.

== Works ==
=== Books ===
- Bartchy, S. Scott (1973). Mallon Chrēsai: First Century Slavery and the Interpretation of 1 Corinthians 7:21. Society of Biblical Literature - Dissertation series. Vol. 11. Missoula, MT: Society of Biblical Literature. ISBN 9780884140221. OCLC 278076732.
- ——— (1982). Some Theses about Gender Roles: "headship," and submission. Los Angeles, CA: Westwood Christian Foundation. OCLC 827718880.

=== Edited by ===
- ———, ed. (2013). Introduction to the History of Religion: History-Religion M4. McGraw-Hill. ISBN 9781121672291. OCLC 835633312.

=== Chapters ===
- ——— (1991). "Community of Goods in Acts: Idealization or Social Reality?". In Pearson, Birger A. (ed.). The Future of Early Christianity: Essays in Honor of Helmut Koester. Minneapolis, MN: Fortress Press. pp. 309–18. ISBN 9780800625214. OCLC 463244367.
- ——— (1992). "Table Fellowship". In Green, Joel B.; McKnight, Scot; Marshall, I. Howard (eds.). Dictionary of Jesus and the Gospels. Downers Grove, IL: InterVarsity Press. pp. 796–800. ISBN 9780830817771.
- ——— (1992). "Slavery (Greco-Roman and New Testament)". Anchor Bible Dictionary. Vol. 6. New York: Doubleday. pp. 65B–73B.
- ——— (1992). "Philemon, Epistle to". Anchor Bible Dictionary. Vol. 5. New York: Doubleday. pp. 305B–10A.
- ——— (1997). "Narrative Criticism". In Martin, Ralph P.; Davids, Peter H. (eds.). Dictionary of the Later New Testament and Its Developments. Downers Grove, IL: InterVarsity Press. pp. 787a–92a.
- ——— (2002). "Divine Power, Community Formation, and Leadership in the Acts of the Apostles". In Longenecker, Richard N. (ed.). Community Formation in the Early Church and in the Church Today. Hendrickson Publishers. pp. 89–104.
- ——— (2002). "The Historical Jesus and Honor Reversal at the Table". In Stegemann, Wolfgang; Malina, Bruce J.; Theissen, Gerd (eds.). The Social Setting of Jesus and the Gospels. Fortress Press. pp. 175–84.
- ——— (2005). "'When I'm Weak, I'm Strong': A Pauline Paradox in Cultural Context". In Strecker, Christian (ed.). Kontexte der Schrift, Band II. Stuttgart: Kohlhammer Verlag. pp. 49–60.

=== Journal articles ===
- ——— (1999). "Undermining Ancient Patriarchy: The Apostle Paul's Vision of a Society of Siblings". Biblical Theology Bulletin. 29 (2): 68–78. doi:10.1177/014610799902900203.
- ——— (2003). "Who Should Be Called Father? Paul of Tarsus between the Jesus Tradition and Patria Potestas". Biblical Theology Bulletin. 33 (4): 135–47. doi:10.1177/014610790303300403.
- ——— (March 2005). "Where is the History in Mel Gibson's The Passion of the Christ?". Pastoral Psychology. 53 (4): 313–28. doi:10.1007/s11089-005-2062-7. - Slightly revised version published in Mel Gibson's Passion: The Film, the Controversy, and Its Implications, ed. Zev Garber (Purdue University Press, 2006), pp. 76–92.
