= FilmRoos =

FilmRoos was an American film production company that produced such documentary television series as Ancient Mysteries (1994), Mysteries of the Bible (1994) (which garnered them several CableACE Award nominations), Christianity: The First Two Thousand Years (1998), and Banned from the Bible (2003) for the A&E Network.

Originally formed in August 1990 as Christy Connell Roos Entertainment Group, Bram Roos (1949–2004) partnered with Michael Christy and Katheryn Connell, but later bought them out and renamed the company FilmRoos. It was later bought by Jordan Friedberg, who handled production duties for FilmRoos.

In 1995, Walter Goodman wrote in the New York Times that their A&E network special offered the viewer, "many...rewards." [1]

Peter Davison composed music for some of FilmRoos' productions.
