= Walter Zanger =

American-born Israeli author and tour guide

Rabbi Dr. Walter Zanger
- וולטר זנגר
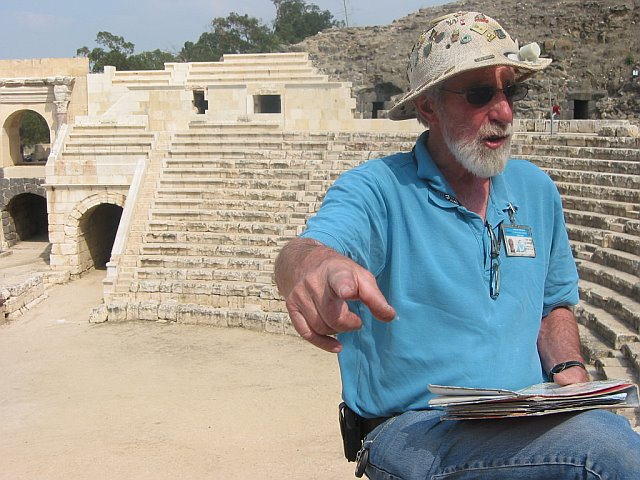
- Zanger in Beit She'an
- Born: 25 September 1935; Brooklyn, New York
- Died: 28 August 2015; Jerusalem, Israel
- Citizenship: Israeli, American
- Education: Amherst College, Hebrew Union College-Jewish Institute of Religion
- Spouse: Paula
- Children: Hanan, Mikhal, Yoel, Jenia
- Website: http://www.walterzanger.net/

Walter Zanger (Hebrew: וולטר זנגר; 1935–2015), was an American-born Israeli author, tour guide and television personality. He was a contributor to newspapers, encyclopedias and magazines, and served as a member of the editorial board of the Jewish Bible Society.

== Biography ==
Walter Zanger was born in Brooklyn, New York in 1935. He moved with his family to Jerusalem, Israel in 1966 and resided in the city's Ein Karem neighborhood until his death in 2015.

== Education ==
Zanger graduated from Amherst College with a Bachelor of Arts cum laude in 1956.

He then studied at the Hebrew Union College-Jewish Institute of Religion in New York, graduating with a Bachelor of Hebrew Letters in 1958. Zanger was also a student at the Hebrew University of Jerusalem. He received a Masters of Arts from the Hebrew Union College-Jewish Institute of Religion and was ordained as a Reform rabbi in 1962.

== Rabbinical career ==
Zanger served as the rabbi of the Harford County Jewish Center in Aberdeen, Maryland from 1959 to 1961 and as the rabbi of Temple Sinai in Massapequa, New York from 1961 to 1962. Afterwards, he served as a chaplain (with the rank of captain) in the U.S. Air Force in Southeast Asia from 1962 to 1964.

In 2000 he officiated the second bar mitzvah of Rabbi Morrison David Bial. Rabbi Bial had officiated Zanger's own bar mitzvah 52 years earlier.

== Publications ==
Zanger was an assistant to the publisher and contributor to the Encyclopaedia Judaica from 1966 to 1972 and wrote for the Biblical Archaeology Society and the Jewish Bible Quarterly He authored several books, including Jerusalem: Holy City to the World's Religions (Great Cities Library) Zanger wrote FROM JERUSALEM, a personal, non-partisan newsletter addressing current events in Israel.

Zanger lectured at the University of South Florida, Amherst College, and at the Jewish Bible Association's Dr. Louis Katzoff Memorial Lecture.

== Tour guide ==
Zanger was a licensed Israeli Master Guide. He was an expert at taking Christians and Jews to their sacred places. His expertise as a tour guide led him to become a television personality. He was featured on 11 episodes (1994-1996) of A&E's Mysteries of the Bible as one of Israel's leading guides.

== Awards and recognition ==
Zanger was a recipient of the Ministry of Tourism "Distinguished Tourism Employee" award. He received an honorary doctor of divinity from the Hebrew Union College—Jewish Institute of Religion in Jerusalem in 2007. He served in an anti-aircraft battalion in the Israel Defense Forces, and, after his discharge was an active volunteer in the Tourism Unit of the Israel Police.

== Legacy ==
At his Amherst College 50th class reunion Zanger wrote "I always just did whatever seemed the right thing at the time, and it always worked out. My life has been -- by far! -- more luck than brains, and I feel fine about that." Walter Zanger died on August 28, 2015.
