= Sports Day (film) =

Sports Day (alternative title, The Colonel's Cup)
- Directed by: Francis Searle
- Written by: Francis Searle
- Produced by: Mary Field and Bruce Woolf for GBI – Gaumont-British Instructional, School programmes and educational films
- Starring: Peter Jeffrey; Roy Russell; Jean Simmons
- Release date: 1945
- Country: United Kingdom
- Language: English

Sports Day is a 1945 short film directed by Francis Searle for Gaumont-British Instructional. It features early appearances of Jean Simmons and Peter Jeffrey.

== Plot ==
A schoolboy almost misses the school sports day when he is wrongly punished for cruelty to a dog.

== Cast ==
- Jean Simmons as Peggy
- Peter Jeffrey as Tom
- Roy Russell as Col. House
- Ernest Borrow as Headmaster
- David Anthony as Bill

== Notes ==
Francis Searle, the director, worked with Gaumont-British Screen Services and Gaumont-British Instructional for seven years. Interviewed in 1995, he explained the situation when the Second World War broke out. "We were put on the reserved list and seconded to the Army, Navy and Air Force for training films, in conjunction with the MoI – we made films like Citizens Advice Bureau, and Sam Pepys joins the Navy, Hospital Nurse. " In the interview he describes how he came to work with Jean Simmons.

“I also worked at Merton Park with Jean Simmons, who I cast in a short picture. Mary Field and Bruce Woolf were the bosses at GBI. (Gaumont-British Instructional). Mary Field did children's films and she had a film she offered to me (Sports Day, 1945). Aida Foster, who was a big agent for juveniles, set up an audition and Jean, aged about fourteen, came on as bright as a button; she had learned the part and that was it. I didn't bother looking at any of the others.'
