= Carole R. Fontaine =

American biblical scholar and feminist (born 1950)

Carol Rader Fontaine (April 11, 1950 - May 29, 2026) was an American biblical scholar, world-renowned wisdom scholar, professor, artist, writer, and activist. Before retirement, she was the John Taylor professor of biblical theology and history at the Andover Newton Theological School and feminist author of six books and over 100 articles, in addition to serving on several editorial boards (including the Journal of Biblical Literature, the Catholic Biblical Quarterly, and the World Book Encyclopedia). She has written extensively on feminist theological topics, including disability.

Fontaine worked on women's rights through NGOs designed to study the impact of religion on women's lives, particularly in a Muslim context.

A collection of her poetry, Only When Women Sing: Poems on Human Rights was published in 2009.

== Early life ==
Fontaine was born in Lima, OH on April 11, 1950, daughter of Olive Jean (née Lee) Rader and Howard Foster Rader, and was raised in Miami, FL in the area that came to be known as Miami’s “Little Haiti.” She grew up in a segregated South among poor whites, Black families, Cuban refugees, and trafficked Haitian girls, an experience that continued to inform her life and academic work.

She met her future husband, Craig William Fontaine, PhD, during her undergraduate years at Florida State University.

== Academic pursuits ==
Fontaine graduated from Florida State University with a Bachelor of Arts in 1972, going on to study at Yale Divinity School, graduating with a Master of Arts in Religion in 1976, and then to Duke University where she received her PhD in 1979. Her doctoral thesis was adapted into the book Traditional Sayings in the Old Testament (1982), an influential text for future students.

While at Yale Divinity, Carole R. Fontaine was recognized as a scholar. Through 1976 to 1979, Fontaine was named a Gurney Harris Kearns fellow at Duke University. While at Duke she received a Zion Foundation grant.

Her first job as an educator was at University of North Carolina at Greensboro in 1979. Shortly after, she became a lecturer at Duke Divinity School. In 1982, Fontaine was offered an adjunct professor position at Boston College in Massachusetts. Fontaine accepted a graduate professor position from Andover Newton Theological School in 1979.

== Select bibliography ==
- Traditional Sayings in the Old Testament, Almond Press, 1982, ISBN 0-907459-09-9
- A Heifer from Thy Stable: On Goddesses and the Status of Women in the Ancient Near East, reprinted in Women in the Hebrew Bible: A Reader, ed. Alice Bach (New York: Routledge, 1999), pp. 159–78
- Wisdom and Psalms: A Feminist Companion to the Bible, Sheffield Academic Press, 1999, ISBN 1-85075-917-0
- A Feminist Companion to Reading the Bible: Approaches, Methods, and Strategies, Sheffield Academic Press, 1997, ISBN 1-85075-674-0
- Smooth Words: Women, Proverbs And Performance In Biblical Wisdom, Sheffield Academic Press, 2004, ISBN 0-567-04270-7
- With Eyes of Flesh: The Bible, Gender and Human Rights (Bible in the Modern World)', Sheffield Phoenix Press, 2008, ISBN 1-905048-55-6
- "Golden Do’s and Don’ts: Leviticus 19:1-17 from a Human-Rights-Based Approach (HRBA)," in Leviticus and Numbers: Text@Contexts Series, edited by Athalya Brenner and Archie Chi-Chung Lee, Fortress Press, 2013.
- Fontaine, Carole R. “A Modern Look at Ancient Wisdom: The Instruction of Ptahhotep Revisited.” The Biblical Archaeologist, vol. 44, no. 3, 1981, pp. 155–60. JSTOR, https://doi.org/10.2307/3209606. Accessed 27 Sept. 2024.
- Fontaine, Carole R., and Timothy J. Sandoval. “Proverbs.” Wisdom, Worship, and Poetry: Fortress Commentary on the Bible Study Edition, edited by Gale A. Yee et al., 1517 Media, 2016, pp. 601–26. JSTOR, https://doi.org/10.2307/j.ctt1b3t793.12. Accessed 27 Sept. 2024.
