= Ancient Mysteries =

- Also known as: Ancient Mysteries: New Investigations of the Unsolved
- Written by: Tom Jennings; Gregory Orr
- Directed by: Tim Evans; Marshall Flaum
- Narrated by: Leonard Nimoy; John Swanson (early episodes); Michael Kramer (early episodes)
- Country of origin: United States
- Original language: English
- No. of seasons: 5
- No. of episodes: 93

Production
- Running time: 45 minutes

Original release
- Network: A&E
- Release: 7 January 1994 – 3 May 1998

Ancient Mysteries is a television series that was produced by FilmRoos and originally broadcast on A&E between January 7, 1994 and May 3, 1998 with reruns airing until 2000. Reruns were also re-broadcast on The Biography Channel during the 2000s. The series deals with historical mysteries and is primarily hosted by Leonard Nimoy (unless otherwise noted), which recalls the late-1970s television series In Search Of....

== Episodes ==
=== Season 1 ===
1. "Bigfoot" (narrated by John Swanson, a Leonard Nimoy-narrated episode of Bigfoot was later produced in 1997) original air date 7 January 1994
2. "Origin of the Vampire" original air date 14 January 1994
3. "The Lost Ark of the Covenant" original air date 21 January 1994
4. "The Lost Pharaoh" original air date 17 June 1994
5. "The Marble Hunter" original air date 8 July 1994
6. "Northern Lights" (narrated by Michael Kramer) original air date 29 July 1994

=== Season 2 ===
1. "Enigma of the Dead Sea Scrolls" original air date 7 October 1994
2. "Rapa Nui" original air date 14 October 1994
3. "The Odyssey of Troy" original air date 10 February 1995
4. "The Shroud of Turin" original air date 21 April 1995
5. "Shreds of Evidence" original air date 21 April 1995
6. "Shadow of the Templars" original air date 12 May 1995
7. "Robot Journey Into the Past" original air date 26 May 1995
8. "Myth of the Spanish Inquisition" original air date 9 June 1995
9. "The Loch Ness Monster" original air date 21 July 1995
10. "Easter Island: The Secrets" original air date 4 August 1995

=== Season 3 ===
1. "The Hidden City of Petra" original air date 8 September 1995
2. "Palenque: The Maya" original air date 15 September 1995
3. "Camelot" original air date 22 September 1995
4. "Vikings in North America" original air date 6 October 1995
5. "Machu Picchu: City in the Sky" original air date 8 October 1995
6. "The Quest for the Fountain of Youth" original air date 13 October 1995
7. "The Timber Castles of England" original air date 20 October 1995
8. "Secret Mounds of Prehistoric America" original air date 29 October 1995
9. "The Search for Shangri-La" original air date 3 November 1995
10. "Who Built Stonehenge?" original air date 10 November 1995
11. "Atlantis: The Lost Civilization" original air date 17 November 1995
12. "The Search for Alexander the Great" original air date 19 November 1995
13. "The Riddle of the Maya" original air date 24 November 1995
14. "The Lost Canyon of the Pueblos" original air date 26 November 1995
15. "Naked Warriors of Europe" original air date 3 December 1995
16. "Life and Death in Britain's Ancient Theaters" original air date 10 December 1995
17. "The Quest for the Holy Lance" original air date 24 December 1995
18. "Blood and Honor at the First Olympics" original air date 11 January 1996
19. "The Sunken City" original air date 14 January 1996
20. "The Miraculous Canals of Venice" original air date 21 January 1996
21. "Blood and Treasure in Peru" original air date 1 February 1996
22. "Pompeii: Buried Alive" original air date 2 February 1996
23. "Hadrian's Wall" original air date 4 February 1996
24. "Secrets of the Pueblo" original air date 22 February 1996
25. "Puzzling Pyramids of Mexico" original air date 29 February 1996
26. "The Rosetta Stone" original air date 21 March 1996
27. "China's Wall of Doom" original air date 21 March 1996
28. "Astrology: Secrets in the Stars" original air date 28 March 1996
29. "The Queen Pharaoh" original air date 11 April 1996
30. "Secrets of Sex: The Kama Sutra" original air date 18 April 1996
31. "Temples of Eternity" original air date 21 April 1996
32. "The Forbidden City: The Dynasty and Destiny" original air date 25 April 1996
33. "The Incredible Monuments of Ancient Rome" original air date 5 May 1996
34. "Lost Spirits of Cambodia" original air date 9 May 1996
35. "Lost Legions of Rome" original air date 12 May 1996
36. "Voodoo!" (two-hour special) original air date 16 May 1996
37. "The Lost Cities of Rome" original air date 19 May 1996
38. "Rites of Death" original air date 6 June 1996
39. "Lost Castles of England" original air date 9 June 1996
40. "Secrets of Delphi" original air date 20 June 1996
41. "The Secret Life of King Ramses II" original air date 11 July 1996
42. "The Powerful Gods of Mt. Olympus" original air date 11 July 1996

=== Season 4 ===
1. "Ancient Altered States" original air date 5 September 1996
2. "Ancient Prophecy" original air date 19 September 1996
3. "Before Their Time: Ancient Technology" original air date 7 October 1996
4. "Hidden Cities of the Etruscans" original air date 10 October 1996
5. "Witches" original air date 24 October 1996
6. "Mystical Monuments of Ancient Greece" original air date 21 November 1996
7. "Sacred Rites and Rituals" original air date 19 December 1996
8. "UFOs: The First Encounters" original air date 2 January 1997
9. "Tombs of the Gods: The Great Pyramids of Giza" original air date 16 January 1997
10. "Secrets of the Aztec Empire" original air date 13 February 1997
11. "The Curse of the Hope Diamond" original air date 6 March 1997
12. "Private Lives of the Emperors" original air date 27 March 1997
13. "Secrets of the Romanovs" original air date 10 April 1997
14. "Legends of the Arabian Nights" original air date 20 April 1997
15. "The Fate of the Neandertals" original air date 27 April 1997
16. "Human Sacrifice" original air date 1 May 1997
17. "Lost City of Pirates" original air date 8 May 1997
18. "Bigfoot" (Leonard Nimoy-narrated version) original air date 15 May 1997
19. "Samurai" original air date 22 May 1997
20. "Curse of the Goddess Pele" original air date 5 June 1997
21. "Guardian of the Ages: The Great Sphinx" original air date 12 June 1997
22. "Sacred Places" original air date 19 June 1997
23. "Dragons: Myths and Legends" original air date 26 June 1997
24. "Headhunters of the Amazon" original air date 3 July 1997
25. "The Black Death" original air date 10 July 1997
26. "Ancient Rome And Its Mysterious Cities" original air date 17 July 1997
27. "The Curse of the Borgias" original air date 31 July 1997

=== Season 5 ===
1. "Tattooing" original air date 7 August 1997
2. "The Sacred Waters of Lourdes" original air date 14 August 1997
3. "The Magic of Alchemy" original air date 17 August 1997
4. "The Search for the Abominable Snowman" original air date 21 August 1997
5. "Quest for the Holy Grail" original air date 28 August 1997
6. "Knights Templar" original air date 7 September 1997
7. "Reincarnation" original air date 2 November 1997
8. "Lost Mummies of the Inca" original air date 4 January 1998
9. "Dreamtime of the Aborigines" original air date 3 May 1998

Note that there may be more episodes.
