= Eric M. Meyers =

Biblical scholar and archaeologist

Eric M. Meyers is an American biblical scholar and a biblical archaeologist. He is the Bernice & Morton Lerner Professor at Duke University.

Meyers has degrees from Dartmouth College, Brandeis University and Harvard University. He has served as President of the American Schools of Oriental Research.

He was honored with the 1982 Norwich Native Son Award.

Meyers is married to fellow biblical scholar and Duke professor Carol Meyers.
