= Jonathan Wilson (author) =

British-born writer and professor

Jonathan Wilson is a British-born writer and professor who lives in Newton, Massachusetts. He is the Fletcher Professor of Rhetoric and Debate as well as the Director of the Center for Humanities at Tufts University. Within the English Department at Tufts, he teaches courses on Creative Writing and contemporary American Fiction. He lives with his wife, Sharon Kaitz, who is an artist. He has two sons, Adam Wilson, a journalist and writer and Gabriel Wilson, who works in film.

== Writing ==
Wilson is the author of the following books:-

- short story collection Schoom (Viking 1994)
- novel The Hiding Room
- novel A Palestine Affair
- story collection An Ambulance is on the Way: Stories of Men in Trouble (Nectbook/Schocken, 2007)
- biography Marc Chagall (Nextbook/Schocken, 2007)
- Herzog: The Limits of Ideas Twayne, and
- On Bellow's Planet: Readings from the Dark Side
- Autobiography Kick and Run, Memoir with a Soccer Ball (Bloomsbury Reader, 2013)

His stories and essays have appeared in The New Yorker, the New York Times Magazine, Best American Short Stories and elsewhere. Wilson writes a column on soccer for the Internet Newspaper, The Faster Times

== Awards ==
A Palestine Affair was a finalist for the 2004 National Jewish Book Awards, and Marc Chagall (Jewish Encounters) was a runner-up for the 2007 National Jewish Book Award. He is a Guggenheim Fellowship recipient.

== Education ==
Ph.D., English, Hebrew University of Jerusalem Israel, 1982
St. Catherine's College, Oxford, England, 1977
Columbia University, New York, U.S.A. Visiting Scholar, 1976
B.A., (Hons.) First Class. University of Essex, England, 1974. Major: English and European Literature. Minor: Art History
