= Charles Lynn Batten =

American academic

- Born: 1942 (age 83–84)
- Occupation: Professor
- Writing career
- Genre: 18th century British literature
- Notable works: Pleasurable Instruction: Form and Convention in Eighteenth Century Travel Literature

Charles Lynn Batten (born 1942) is an American literary critic and a professor in the department of English at the University of California, Los Angeles. He has won numerous teaching awards throughout his career at UCLA, including the Distinguished Teaching Award in 1981. ,

== Publications ==
- Pleasurable Instruction: Form and Convention in Eighteenth Century Travel Literature, 1978.
