= Carol Meyers =

American archaeologist

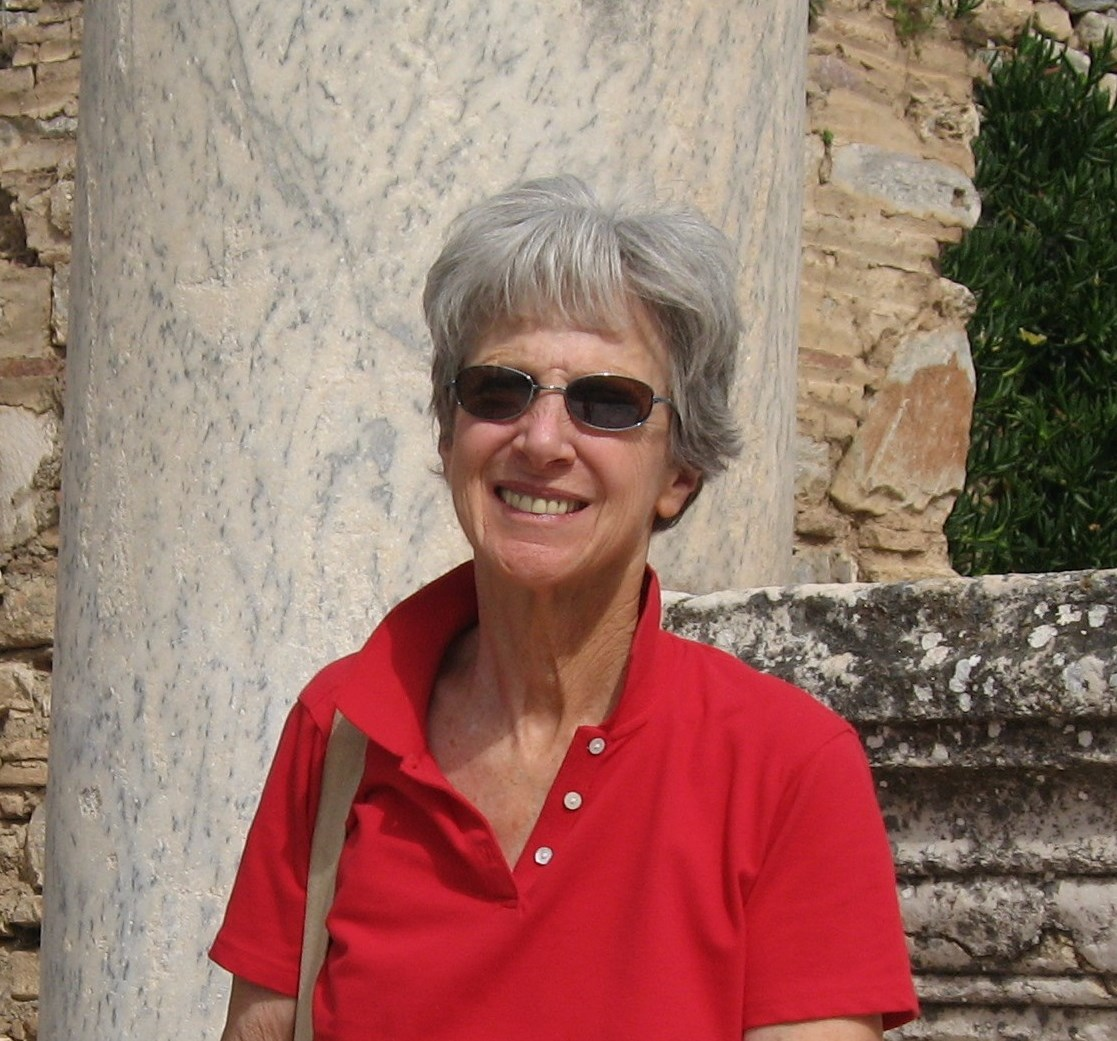
- Meyers in 2017
- Born: 1942 (age 83–84); Wilkes-Barre, Pennsylvania
- Education: Brandeis University
- Occupations: Professor, scholar of religion
- Employer: Duke University
- Notable work: Discovering Eve
- Title: Mary Grace Wilson Professor Emerita of Religious Studies
- Spouse: Eric M. Meyers

Carol Lyons Meyers (born 1942) is an American feminist biblical scholar. She is the Mary Grace Wilson Professor Emerita of Religious Studies at Duke University. Meyers' field of research is focused on biblical studies, archaeology in the Middle East, and the study of women in the biblical world.

== Biography ==
Carol Meyers was born in Wilkes-Barre, Pennsylvania. She went to Kingston High School, Kingston, Pennsylvania; earned her B.A. with honors at Wellesley College in Wellesley, Massachusetts, and her Ph.D. at Brandeis University in Waltham, Massachusetts in 1975.

Meyers started to teach at Duke University in 1977. She writes and teaches in the areas of biblical studies, archaeology, and the study of women in the biblical world. She has been described as "one of today's leading historians and field archeologists". Her 1988 book, Discovering Eve: Ancient Israelite Women in Context, was the "first comprehensive effort to present a female-centered view of the Bible using historical rather than literary criticism". Meyers has also written commentaries on Exodus, Haggai, and Zechariah.

Meyers served as president of the Society of Biblical Literature in 2013. She also served as part of the revision team for the 2010 New American Bible.

She is married to fellow biblical scholar and Duke professor Eric M. Meyers.

== Awards and honors ==
- P. E. Macalister Field Archaeology Award, American Schools of Oriental Research, November 2014.
- Outstanding Service in Mentoring, Society of Biblical Literature Committee on the Status of Women in the Profession, November 2008.
- Alumnae Achievement Award, Wellesley College, 1999.
- Severinghaus Award, Wellesley College, 1991.

== Publications ==
- Rediscovering Eve: Ancient Israelite Women in Context. New York: Oxford University Press, 2012
- Households and Holiness: The Religious Culture of Israelite Women. Minneapolis: Fortress Press, 2005.
- Exodus. New Cambridge Bible Commentary Series. Cambridge: Cambridge University Press, 2005.
- Discovering Eve: Ancient Israelite Women in Context. Oxford: Oxford University Press, 1991.
- The Tabernacle Menorah: A Synthetic Study of A Symbol from the Biblical Cult. 1972. Reprint edition, Piscatawny, NJ: Gorgias Press, 2003.
