= Bruce Malina =

American biblical scholar

Bruce John Malina (9 October 1933 – 17 August 2017) was an American biblical scholar, noted for his application of social scientific approaches to the Bible.

== Biography ==
Malina was born in Brooklyn, New York, as the eldest of nine children to his parents Joseph and Mary Malina, and was ordained a Franciscan Friar at age 27. He completed his PhD in 1967 from Institutum Biblicum Franciscanum, Jerusalem, with his dissertation published the next year as The Palestinian Manna Tradition (1968).

After teaching in the Philippines for five years, Malina moved to Creighton University in 1969 where he taught New Testament studies for 48 years. It was also during this time that he retired from the priesthood and married Diane Jacobs in 1972.

== Scholarship ==
Malina was associated with the Context Group and was known for his application of social scientific approaches to the Bible, and was at the forefront of bringing in insights from anthropology and sociology to bear on understanding ancient religious and social concepts found in the Bible. Malina stands as one of the primary initiators of and major contributors to the deployment of terms such as "honor," "shame," "benefactor," "patronage," and "social boundaries" in analyzing the Bible. He was also known for studies on gender roles in the New Testament world.

== Criticism ==
Malina was criticized for his views on the Israeli–Palestinian conflict and how this has influenced his scholarship. On the one hand, it is claimed that he takes a firm stance against the modern state of Israel, going as far as to deny the Semitic ancestry of modern Israelis.

== Works ==
- 1968. The Palestinian Manna Tradition: The Manna Tradition in the Palestinian Targums and Its Relationship to the New Testament Writings. Arbeiten zur Geschichte des Spätjudentums und Urchristentums 7. Leiden: Brill.
- 1981. The New Testament World: Insights from Cultural Anthropology. 1st ed. Atlanta: John Knox.
- 1985. The Gospel of John in Sociolinguistic Perspective: Protocol of the Forty-Eighth Colloquy, 11 March 1984. Berkeley: Center for Hermeneutical Studies in Hellenistic and Modern Culture.
- 1986. Christian Origins and Cultural Anthropology: Practical Models for Biblical Interpretation. Atlanta: John Knox. Reprint, Eugene, OR: Wipf & Stock, 2010.
- 1988. And Jerome H. Neyrey. Calling Jesus Names: The Social Value of Labels in Matthew. Foundations & Facets: Social Facets. Sonoma, CA: Polebridge.
- 1992. And Richard L. Rohrbaugh. Social Science Commentary on the Synoptic Gospels. Minneapolis: Fortress.
- 1993. The New Testament World: Insights from Cultural Anthropology. 2nd ed. Louisville: Westminster John Knox.
- 1993. Windows on the World of Jesus: Time Travel to Ancient Judea. Louisville: Westminster John Knox.
- 1993. And John J. Pilch, editors. Biblical Social Values and Their Meaning: A Handbook. 1st ed. Peabody, MA: Hendrickson.
- 1995. On the Genre and Message of Revelation: Star Visions and Sky Journeys. Peabody, MA: Hendrickson.
- 1996. The Social World of Jesus and the Gospels. London: Routledge.
- 1996. And Jerome H. Neyrey. Portraits of Paul: An Archaeology of Ancient Personality.
- 1998. And Richard L. Rohrbaugh. Social Science Commentary on the Gospel of John. Minneapolis: Fortress.
- 1998. And John J. Pilch, editors. Handbook of Biblical Social Values. 2nd ed. Peabody, MA: Hendrickson.
- 2000. The New Jerusalem in the Revelation of John: The City as Symbol of Life with God. Collegeville, MN: Liturgical.
- 2000. And John J. Pilch. Social Science Commentary on the Book of Revelation. Minneapolis: Fortress.
- 2001. The New Testament World: Insights from Cultural Anthropology. 3rd ed. Louisville: Westminster John Knox.
- 2001. The Social Gospel of Jesus: The Kingdom of God in Mediterranean Perspective. Minneapolis: Fortress.
- 2002. And Wolfgang Stegemann and Gerd Theissen, editors. The Social Setting of Jesus and the Gospels. Minneapolis: Fortress. German edition: Jesus in neuen Kontexten. Stuttgart: Kohlhammer, 2002.
- 2002. The Social World of Jesus and the Gospels. London: Routledge.
- 2003. And Richard L. Rohrbaugh. Social-Science Commentary on the Synoptic Gospels. 2nd ed. Minneapolis: Fortress.
- 2006. And John J. Pilch. Social-Science Commentary on the Letters of Paul. Minneapolis: Fortress.
- 2008. Timothy: Paul's Closest Associate. Paul's Social Network. Collegeville, MN: Liturgical.
- 2008. And John J. Pilch. Social-Science Commentary on the Book of Acts. Minneapolis: Fortress.
- 2013. * 2000. And John J. Pilch. Social Science Commentary on the Deutero-Pauline Letters. Minneapolis: Fortress.
- 2016. And John J. Pilch, editors. Handbook of Biblical Social Values. 3rd ed. Matrix—The Bible in Mediterranean Context 10. Eugene, OR: Cascade Books.
