= Philistia =

Territory inhabited by the Philistines in Canaan

- 1175 BC–604 BC
- Philistia (red) and neighbouring kingdoms around 830 BC, after the Israelite conquest of Jaffa, but before the Philistine reconquest around 730 BC
- Common languages: Philistine; Canaanite; Aramaic (from the 6th century BC)
- Religion: Canaanite religion
- Demonym: Philistine
- Government: Confederation
- Historical era: Iron Age
  - Late Bronze Age collapse: 1175 BC
  - Babylonian conquest of the Levant: 604 BC
Preceded by	Succeeded by
Canaanites	Neo-Assyrian Empire
- Today part of: Israel; Palestine; Egypt

Philistia (Note: Hebrew: פְּלֶשֶׁת, romanized: Pəlešeṯ; Biblical Greek: Γῆ τῶν Φυλιστιείμ, romanized: Gê tôn Phylistieím) refers to the territory inhabited by the Philistines in Canaan, where they maintained a pentapolis comprising the cities of Gaza, Ashkelon, Ashdod, Ekron, and Gath. For a time, Philistia also included Jaffa, which may have briefly changed hands with Israel before it was ultimately lost to the Neo-Assyrian Empire during Sennacherib's Levantine campaign.

Scholars believe that the Philistines originated from Greek migrant groups of the Aegean civilization that, from roughly 1200 BC onwards, settled in the area and gradually intermixed with the indigenous Canaanite population. In this context, they are also generally identified with the Peleset, who are mentioned in ancient Egyptian records and are hypothesized to have been among the invading Sea Peoples around the Late Bronze Age collapse. At their territorial zenith, the Philistine confederation may have stretched along the Canaanite coast from Arish in the Sinai Peninsula to the Yarkon River running through Tel Aviv, and as far inland as Ekron and Gath.

In 604 BC, Babylonian armies under Nebuchadnezzar II invaded Philistia, annexing it to the Neo-Babylonian Empire and destroying Ashkelon and Ekron in response to Philistine revolts. Following this campaign, Philistia and its population disappear from recorded history. In the 2nd century BC, the Philistine confederation and its cities (Joppa, Jamina, and Azotus) reappear in biblical and Greek texts in the context of the Maccabean Revolt and the Hellenistic period.

== History ==
Ancient Egyptian hieroglyphic records from the New Kingdom period record a group of the Sea Peoples called the pwrꜣsꜣtj, generally transliterated as either Peleset or Pulasti, as invading Egypt in the mid-13th century BC. About a century later, pharaoh Ramesses III boasted of having defeated the Peleset, and allegedly relocated them to the southern abandoned coast of Canaan, recording this victory on a Medinet Habu temple inscription dated to c. 1150 BC. The pwrꜣsꜣtj are generally identified as the Philistines. The Great Harris Papyrus, a chronicle of Ramesses' reign written no later than 1149 BC, also records this Egyptian defeat of the Philistines.

Despite Ramesses III's claim, archaeology has not been able to corroborate the existence of any such (re)settlement, and the lack of sense in granting an apparently barbarous invading people an expansive and richly fertile swath of land already under Egyptian control is noted by scholars.

During Iron Age I, the Philistines seem to have had a presence far outside of what was traditionally considered Philistia, as 23 of the 26 Iron Age I sites in the Jezreel Valley, including Tel Megiddo, Tel Yokneam, Tel Qiri, Afula, Tel Qashish, Be'er Tiveon, Hurvat Hazin, Tel Risim, Tel Re'ala, Hurvat Tzror, Tel Sham, Midrakh Oz and Tel Zariq, yielded typical Philistine pottery dating from the 12th-to-10th century BC. However, given the small quantity of pottery finds, it is likely that even if the Philistines had settled in the area, they remained a minority and assimilated into the Canaanite population by the 10th century BC.

Philistia's northern boundary was the Yarkon River, with the Mediterranean Sea on the west, the Kingdom of Judah at Ziklag to the east, and the Arish to the south. Philistia consisted of the five city-states, known as the Philistine pentapolis, as described in the Book of Joshua (Joshua 13:3) and the Books of Samuel (1 Samuel 6:17). It comprised Ashkelon, Ashdod, Ekron, Gath, and Gaza, in the south-western Levant. Tell Qasile and Aphek (see Battle of Aphek) likely marked the nation's frontiers, as evidence from Tell Qasile especially indicates that non-Philistines constituted an otherwise unusually large portion of their respective populations. The identity of the aforementioned Ziklag, a city which according to the Bible marked the border between the Philistine and Israelite territory, remains uncertain.

Philistia included Jaffa (in today's Tel Aviv). Following Sennacherib's third campaign in the Levant, the Assyrians reassigned Jaffa to the Phoenician city-state of Sidon, and Philistia never got it back.

The Five Lords of the Philistines are described in the Hebrew Bible as being in constant struggle and interaction with the neighbouring Israelites, Canaanites and Egyptians, being gradually absorbed into the Canaanite culture.

Philistia was occupied by Tiglath-Pileser III of the Neo-Assyrian Empire in the 8th century BC. Throughout the century, often at the incitement of neighboring Egypt, Philistia revolted against Assyrian rule, but each time they were defeated and forced to pay tribute. Gath disappears from history after Sargon II records its capture in 711 BC, which may indicate he destroyed the city rather than conquered it. The term "Philistia" is not used in Assyrian records describing their campaigns, only the names of individual cities, which may indicate that at this stage the Philistines had become increasingly divided, and that the confederation of the pentapolis which constituted Philistia had fractured into separate city-states. Sennacherib further reported that he had sacked (and possibly burned) a "royal city of the land Philistia that [Hezek]iah had taken away (and) fortified," but the city's name has not survived. The texts also mention that Ashkelon was sacked due to its refusal to acknowledge Assyrian authority. Despite this Philistine sedition, Sennacherib records that he divided up the lands he had plundered from Judah amongst the kings of Ashdod, Gaza, and Ekron, even going as far as freeing Padi, the king of Ekron, from Judahite captivity and returning him to the throne.

The Philistines disappear from written records following the conquest of the Levant by the Neo-Babylonian emperor Nebuchadnezzar II during the 6th century BC, when Ashkelon and many other cities from the region were destroyed.

== East of Gaza ==
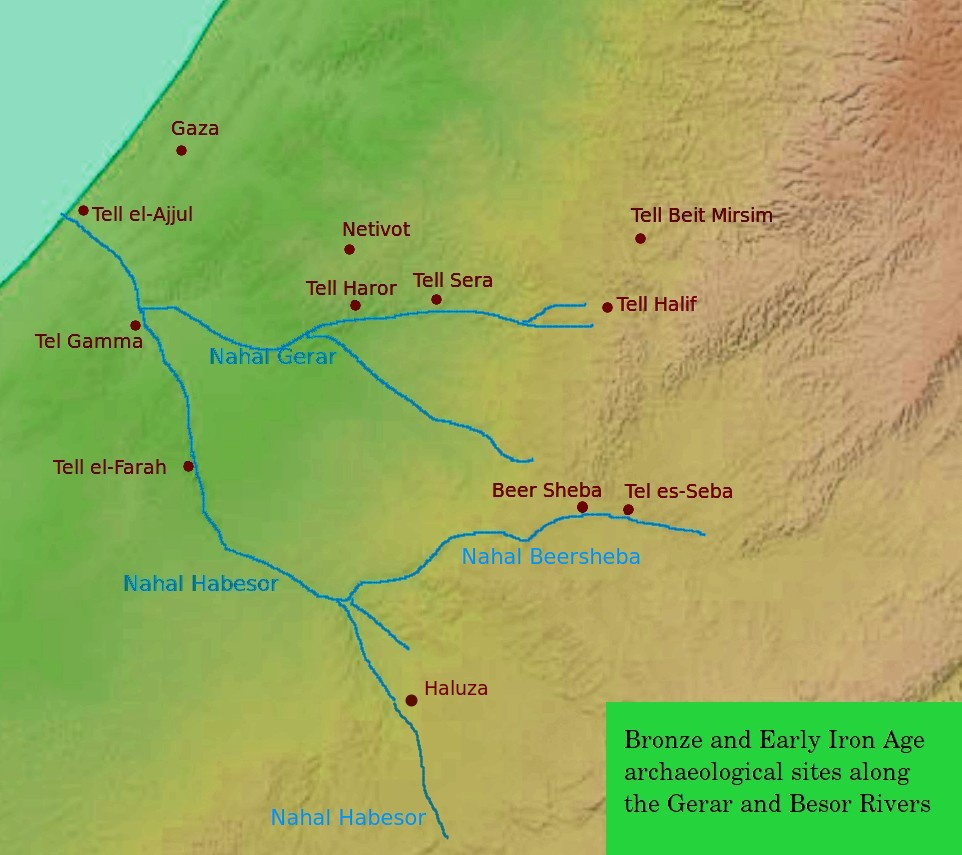
The area around Nahal Besor and Nahal Gerar at the time of Philistine presence

The area east of Gaza, particularly around Nahal Besor that reaches into the hills as far as Beersheva, had a very substantial Philistine presence. This area is a part of the Negev desert. It also includes Nahal Gerar to the north that joins Nahal Besor before flowing into the Mediterranean Sea.

This was a heavily populated area during the early Iron Age. It includes archaeological sites such as Tell Beit Mirsim, Tel Haror, Tel Sera (Ziklag) along Nahal Gerar, and Tell Jemmeh and Tell el-Far'ah (South) along Nahal Besor. All these sites and others in the area had Philistine settlements.

When the Neo-Assyrian Empire first invaded this area, the Philistine cities were given considerable autonomy in exchange for tribute. But having responded to various revolts, this policy hardened.

== See also ==
- Achish the king of Gath
- Gaza Strip
- Palistin (or Walistin), a Syro-Hittite kingdom (11th–9th c. BC) in what is now NW Syria and the SE Turkish province of Hatay
- Timeline of the region of Palestine
- Timeline of the name "Palestine"

== Bibliography ==
- Drews, Robert (1995), "Four: Migrations", The End of the Bronze Age: Changes in Warfare and the Catastrophe Ca. 1200 B.C., Princeton University Press, pp. 48–72, ISBN 978-0-69102591-9
- Killebrew, Ann (2005), Biblical Peoples and Ethnicity: An Archaeological Study of Egyptians, Canaanites, Philistines, and Early Israel, 1300–1100 B.C.E., Society of Biblical Lit, ISBN 978-1-58983-097-4
- Masalha, Nur (15 August 2018). Palestine: A Four Thousand Year History. Zed Books, Limited. ISBN 978-1-78699-273-4.
- Ussishkin, David (2008). "The Date of the Philistine Settlement in the Coastal Plain: The View from Megiddo and Latish". In Grabbe, Lester L. (ed.). Israel in Transition: From late Bronze II to Iron IIa (c. 1250–850 B.C.E.). Volume I. The Archaeology. New York: T & T Clark International. pp. 203–216. ISBN 978-0-567-02726-9.
