= Charge at Sheria =

- Part of Middle Eastern theatre of World War I
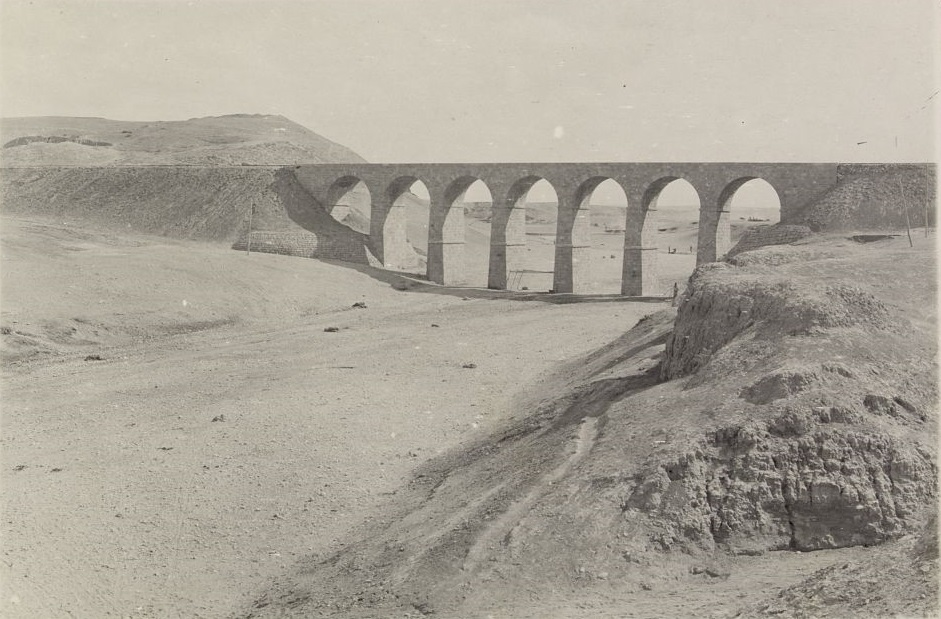
- Sheria railway bridge
Date	7 November 1917
Location	Road and railway north west of Beersheba, the Hareira and Tel el Sheria defenses
Result	British victory

Belligerents
British Empire: United Kingdom of Great Britain and Ireland; Australia; New Zealand	Ottoman Empire; German Empire

Commanders and leaders
(United Kingdom of Great Britain and Ireland) Edmund Allenby (Australia) Harry Chauvel	(German Empire) Erich von Falkenhayn (German Empire) Friedrich von Kressenstein (Ottoman Empire) Fevzi Pasha

Units involved
Egyptian Expeditionary Force: 60th (2/2nd London) Division (*XX Corps); 4th Light Horse Brigade (Australian Mounted Division, Desert Mounted Corps)	Yildirim Army Group: 16th Ottoman Division (XX Corps); Zuheilika Group (partly from 26th Ottoman Division and partly from Hareira garrison)

The Charge at Sheria took place on 7 November 1917 during the Battle of Hareira and Sheria when the 11th and 12th Light Horse Regiments (4th Light Horse Brigade) charged a Yildirim Army Group rearguard in support of an attack by the 60th (London) Division during the Southern Palestine Offensive of the Sinai and Palestine Campaign in World War I.

Following the victory at the Battle of Beersheba on 31 October, Ottoman Army forces continued to hold most of their front line stretching from Gaza on the Mediterranean coast to the mound of Tel el Sheria and Tel el Khuweilfe, in the Judean Hills to the north of Beersheba.

A major offensive launched by the Egyptian Expeditionary Force (EEF) on 6 November could not dislodge the Ottoman defenders at Gaza, Hareira and Tel el Khuweilfe. Although Sheria and Tel el Khuweilfe continued to be strongly defended, the heavy EEF bombardment by the XXI Corps against Gaza, resulted in the Ottoman garrison withdrawing from Gaza during the night. During 7 November the attack by the XX Corps, led by the 60th (London) Division and supported by the 10th (Irish) Division on the left and the 74th (Yeomanry) Division on the right, gained some ground in the morning but was held up by a strong position at Sheria, when the Australian Mounted Division was ordered to attack mounted. The 11th and 12th Light Horse Regiments charged into the face of heavy artillery, machine gun and rifle fire, was forced to stop and dismount as the fire was too fierce. One troop missed the signal and was annihilated, after they charged up and over the Ottoman trenches.

== Background ==
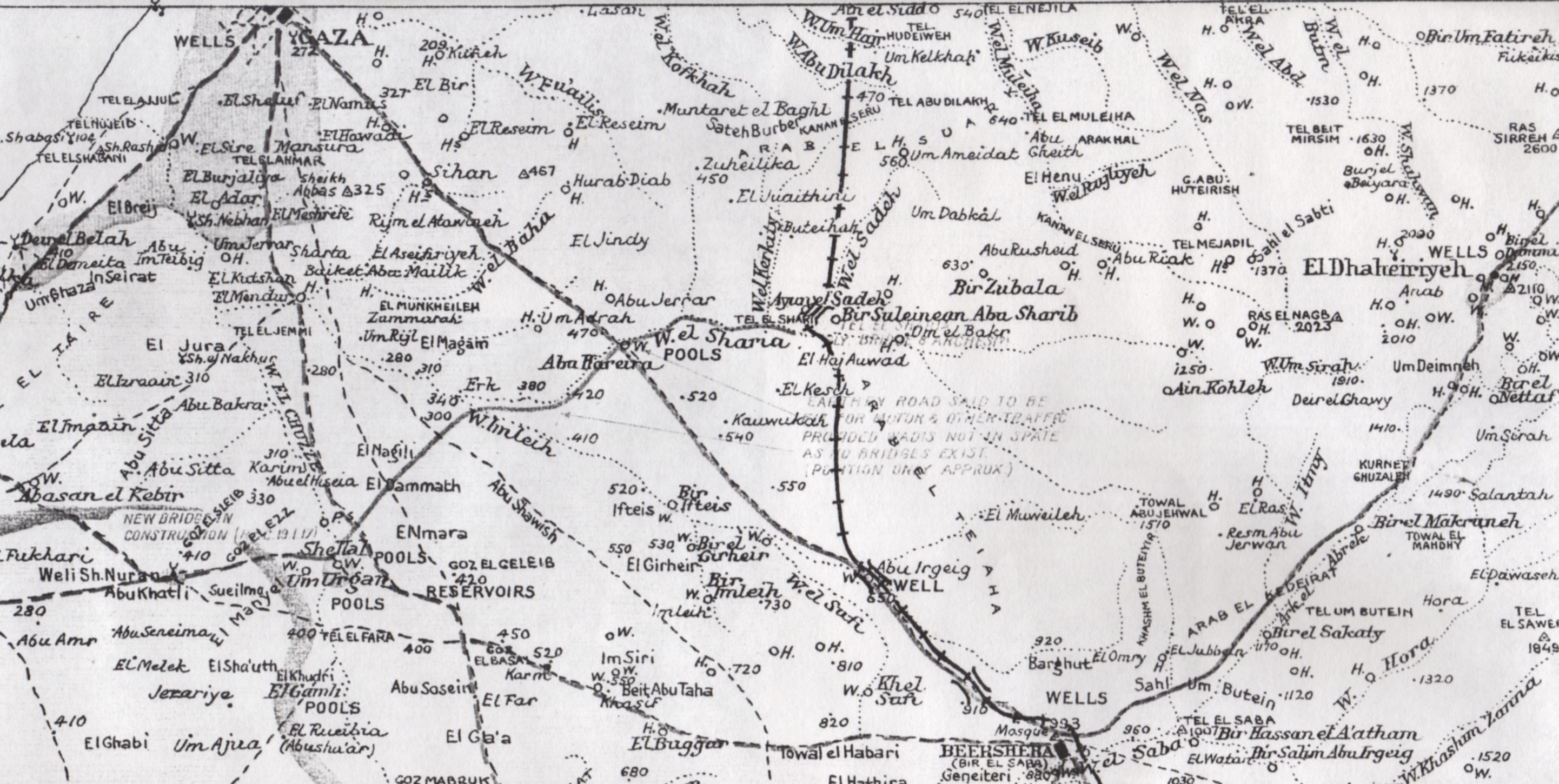
Detail of El Arish to Beersheba Map showing the Gaza to Beersheba line, Sheria and El Dhaheiriyeh

During the stalemate from April to October 1917, the EEF front line extended for 22 miles (35 km) from the Mediterranean coast at Gaza to a point on the Wadi Ghazzeh near El Gamli, about 14 miles (23 km) south-west of Sharia and 18 miles (29 km) west of Beersheba on the southern edge of the plain of Philistia. The official rifle strength of the EEF on 28 October 1917, was 80,000 in the infantry divisions and Imperial Camel Brigade, and 15,000 cavalry. However, the "actual strength ... [was] about 60,000 and 12,000 respectively." The strength of the EEF infantry, as compared with the Ottoman defenders was a ratio of 2:1, while cavalry was 8:1 and guns were about 3:2. (Note: Half the brigades in Desert Mounted Corps were light horse and mounted rifles, armed only with rifle and bayonet. [Keogh 1955 pp. 125–6])

While the Ottoman defenders had developed Gaza into "a strong modern fortress", complete with a glacis on its southern and south–eastern side, permanent strongly entrenched and wired positions were constructed to Shellal on the Wadi Ghazza with both Sheria and Beersheba, particularly strongly fortified. The estimated strength of the Ottoman force holding the Gaza to Beersheba line was 40,000 rifles, this was actually 33,000 rifles, 1,400 sabres and 260 guns. The main Ottoman position extending from the Mediterranean shore west of Gaza to south east of Tel esh Sheria was held by the XX Corps commanded by Ali Faud Bey.

== Prelude ==
After the capture of Beersheba, although the Ottoman defenders suffered many casualties, "stubborn fighting continued" against strong Ottoman rearguards, which delayed an EEF breakthrough for seven days. Strong Ottoman garrisons and rearguards continued to hold the Tel Khuweilfe area, Sheria, and Gaza along with western part of their front line including Tank and Atawineh redoubts. However, the once-formidable Gaza-Beersheba line was becoming vulnerable, and at dawn on 6 November three divisions of Chetwode's XX Corps attacked on a broad front about the center of the Ottoman defensive line. Along with the main attack towards Tel esh Sheria in the center of the line, Tel el Khuweilfe on the eastern end of the line was also attacked by the EEF on 6 November. This fighting caused the Yildirim Army Group Ottoman to reinforce the center and eastern extremity of their front line.

During 6 November the EEF had advanced about 9 miles (14 km) capturing a "series of strong enemy works covering a front of some 7 miles (11 km)." Although the Wadi esh Sheria had not been crossed, only Tel esh Sheria and the main Hareira redoubts, remained in Ottoman hands overnight. Falkenhayn commanding Yildirim Army Group, realized that the Ottoman forces could not hold the EEF much longer, and he ordered the Seventh and Eighth Armies to withdraw about 10 kilometres (6.2 mi). The heavy EEF bombardment of the Ottoman defences in the Gaza area, which had begun on 27 October, intensifying during the night of 5/6 November to a maximum on 6 November, resulted in the Gaza garrison evacuating the town during the night of 6/7 November.

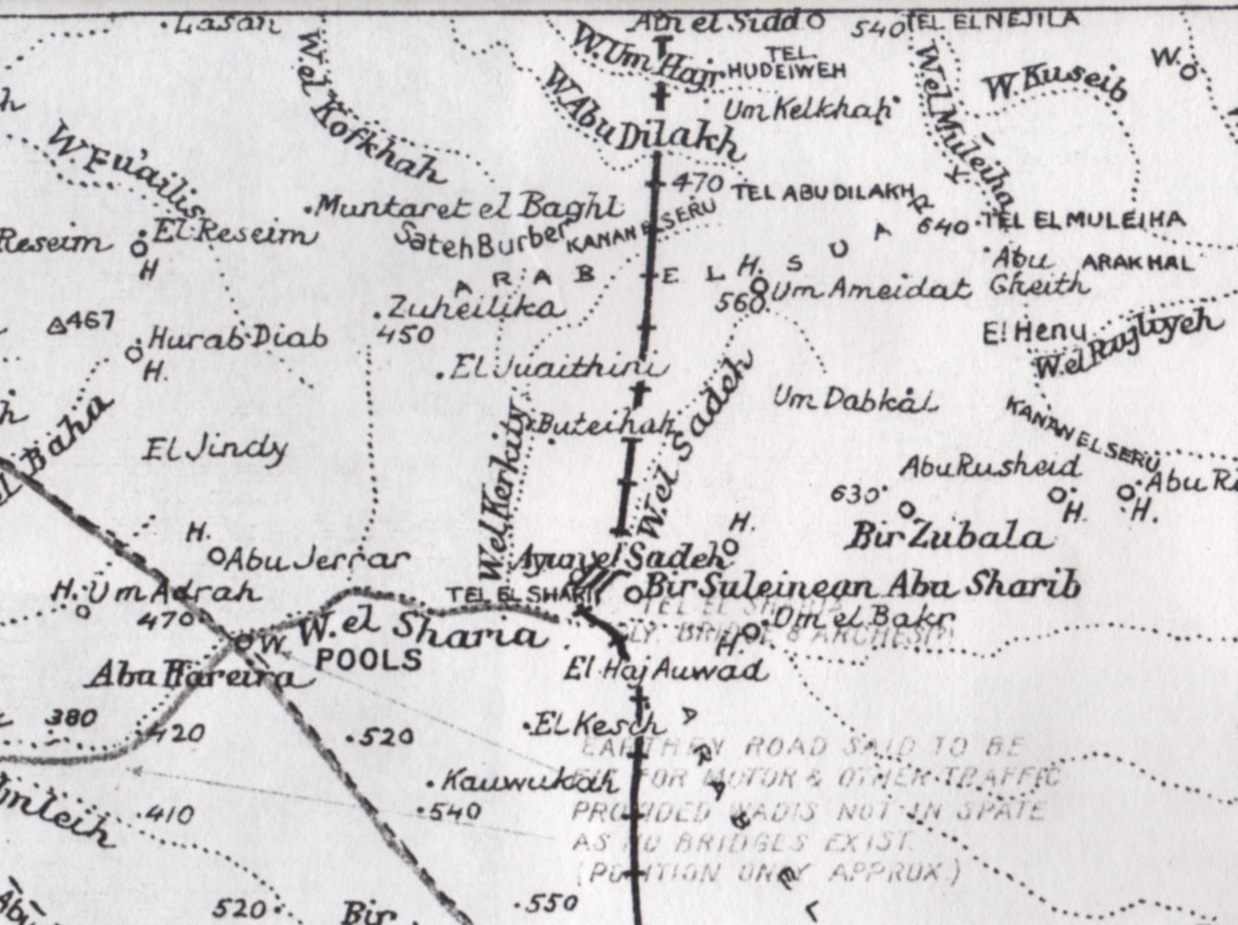
Detail of El Arish to Beersheba Map showing the Sheria position

Ottoman units of the 26th Division at Khirbet Sihan along with units from the Hereira redoubt garrison, were withdrawn to form a reserve of no more than about 1,000 men, after all the Seventh and Eighth Armies' reserved had been committed. Referred to as the Zuheilika Group, they concentrated at the central position of Khirbet Zuheilika, to the north of Hareira and Sheria, After the 60th (London) Division had captured Sheria Station at 17:50 on 6 November, the small in number but fresh Zuheilika Group, was committed during the evening to reinforce the 16th Ottoman Division defending the Wadi esh Sheria.

Chetwode issued orders during the night for the 10th (Irish) Division to capture the Hareira redoubt, and for the 60th (London) Division to transfer from the XX Corps to the Desert Mounted Corps. Chauvel ordered the 60th (London) Division to capture Tel el Sheria and then advance to Huj.

A reconnaissance of the Ottoman positions at Sheria, was carried out by the 181st Brigade (60th Division), with a view to crossing the wadi at two places to capture the high ground stretching from Barrata to the railway. The commander of a machine gun section of the 180th Machine Gun Company, describes coming under heavy fire at about 04:00. "Walk across the open under shell, m.g. and rifle fire ... [the] battle of Machine Guns v. Machine Guns, depend[ing] entirely on the coolness of each individual gunner." Meanwhile, the 74th (Yeomanry) Division took up a position on the right of the 60th (London) Division. The 230th Brigade (74th Division) was ordered not to advance across the Wadi esh Sheria, nor extend their right to the Kh. Barrata, until touch with the 60th (London) Division could be established. As touch could not be established, they remained in position during the night.

Chauvel ordered the Anzac and Australian Mounted Divisions to begin their advance northwards to establish a line from Jemmameh to Huj the next day. All arms were to advance strongly and decisively to capture as many of the Ottoman forces as possible. The Australian Mounted Division (less the 3rd Light Horse Brigade which was holding a line linking the XX Corps with the XXI Corps) left the Wadi Hanafish/Kh Imlieh at 02:30 and was concentrated 3 miles (4.8 km) south, south-west of Tel esh Sheria by 07:30, when the 5th Mounted Brigade rejoined the division and the 7th Mounted Brigade returned to Desert Mounted Corps reserve.

Up at 02:00 on 7 November and hurried on. Moved fast till dawn, when we crossed the Beersheba-Gaza-Jerusalem railway line ... Everyone rushing on, pushing on, hurrying on – staff cars, wireless, transports, camels, mounted troops; Australian and Yeomanry, infantry, artillery, donkeys, mules horses and camels galore, without end. Turks retiring fast. Artillery firing all the time, and we move up just within range and halt. Then an hour or two later we move on and repeat the process. The Turks are pulling back all the time and their big guns are keeping us back. Our guns also blazing away all the time. Then moved through deserted Turkish lines – bivvies, tents, camps, hospitals, ammunition dumps, dead horses and discarded equipment in every direction, all along the track. Came into rougher country about midday and crossed a wadi. As we moved up, came under direct artillery fire. High explosive shells exploding just ahead. Got down into a wadi just in time. Here we were heavily shelled for about half an hour. We stopped by a just captured bakery, and the more hardy walked around and helped themselves to hot, fresh bread, while others lay under the wadi bank as close as they could get, and listened to the shells whistling overhead.

— Hamilton, 4th Light Horse Field Ambulance

=== Location of the Sheria position ===
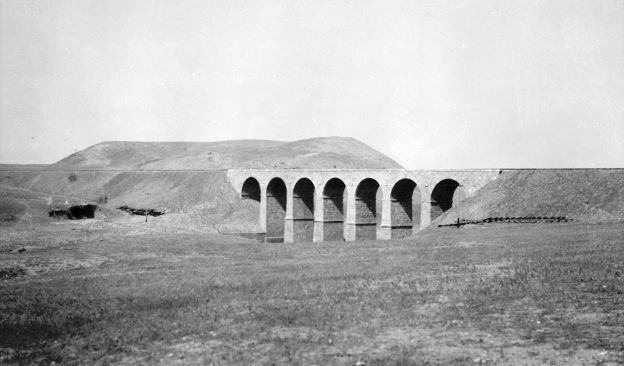
Sheria railway bridge crossing the Wadi Sheria with Tel el Sheria behind

The 12th Light Horse Regiment was informed at about 7:30, that the Sheria position had been captured by the 60th London Division, and that the Ottoman garrison was retiring northwards. (Note: None of the sources listed in the Reference section include a map of the attack on the Sheria position, so it is difficult to know exactly where the Sheria railway station was located and where the fighting occurred, after the station was captured.) "[T]he hill was stormed at 4.30 next morning and carried at the point of the bayonet." However, the Londoners' advance was stopped by a strongly entrenched Ottoman rearguard position 1.5 miles (2.4 km) to the north, with excellent vantage over their approach across bare sloping ground. The Londoners took up a defensive position about 1,000 yards (910 m) from this Ottoman rearguard position, while the Ottoman rearguard had withdrawn to a line about 1.5 miles (2.4 km) to the north on a long gentle bare slope leading up from the wadi on the extreme flank of the Ottoman defences. Here they reformed and dug in on a strong position with an "excellent zone of fire" sweeping the slope with shrapnel, machine guns and rifle fire. "The check to the Londoners on the slope beyond Sheria seriously hampered the success of the British plan … it meant a day's delay at least to Shea's [and Hodgson's] advance towards Huj." The light horse regiments were then ordered to make a mounted attack on a redoubt defended by machine guns, rifles, and covered from behind by a big gun. They were to ride across open, bare and absolutely barren approach without any cover, to charge straight in on the redoubt at the gallop. A Situation Report at 14:40 located the battle to the north of Sheria hospital, 1 mile (1.6 km) north of Tel el Sheria, yet the position was attacked and captured by two battalions which crossed the Wadi esh Sheria at 17:00.

=== Plan of attack ===
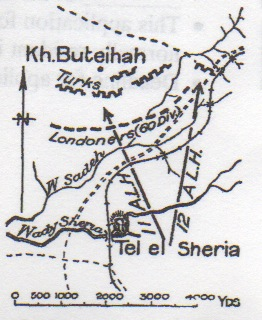
Kh. Buteihah attack

Chauvel issued orders to the Australian Mounted Division at 08:05, to advance on the eastern side of the railway, to the Wadi esh Sheria. He aimed to bring the Australian Mounted Division into touch with the Anzac Mounted Division (less the New Zealand Mounted Rifles Brigade and two squadrons of machine guns at Tel el Khuweilfe along with the Yeomanry Mounted Division), as soon as possible. By 08:50, the Australian Mounted Division consisting of the 4th Light Horse and the 5th Mounted Brigade, was approaching Tel esh Sheria, while the Anzac Mounted Division was deployed to the west of Kh. Umm el Bakr. However plans for Desert Mounted Corps' advance on 7 November were delayed by the "check to the Londoners on the slope beyond Sheria." Chauvel ordered the 4th Light Horse and 5th Mounted Brigades, to "clear the enemy from the front of the 60th Division." They were to advance through the Londoners, to make a mounted charge directly on the front of the Ottoman rearguard position, rather than a flank attack.

The 11th Light Horse Regiment had moved out to take up a line from Kh. Barata to the Wadi el Kerkerty by 10:00, with the 12th Light Horse Regiment on their right extending the line to the wadi Barata. At 10:15 Chauvel ordered Hodgson to "move with centre on Kh Buteiha [3,000 yards (2,700 m) west, north-west of Tel esh Sheria] via G. 23 central [on the railway 1,000 yards (910 m) north of the wadi]." Chauvel gave Hodgson "his exact line of advance," "a definite axis of advance and objective", "against a very hard section," "through defined squares on the map of operations, with his centre on a mud hut at Khurbet Buteihah, on the ridge behind the Turkish line of defences," but a delay allowed the Ottoman rearguard to strengthen the position before the charge began. The direction of this advance had been laid down by the Egyptian Expeditionary Force General Staff in a letter written at 11:07 on 4 November. The orders for the "XXth Corps and Desert Mounted Corps" attacks on 6 November, included an advance "by the XXth Corps on the line Kh Buteihah - Sheria - Kh Kauwukah." The two objectives of this advance were to push the enemy rearguard back from the 60th (London) Division, to give the infantry room to concentrate, and to enable the Australian Mounted Division to gain touch with the Anzac Mounted Division.

== Battle ==
Falls Map 4 Detail: Sheria and positions of Ottoman forces on 6 November

Just before 11:00 the leading squadrons of the 11th Light Horse Regiment reached Tel esh Sheria where a conference was called by the 4th Light Horse Brigade commander, when orders were issued for an attack, on a "strong horseshoe position." The 4th Light Horse Brigade had been ordered to cross the wadi mounted and attack Khurbet Buteihah, in the direction of Zuheilika and Huj, with the 5th Mounted Brigade in support. See above 'Detail of El Arish to Beersheba Map showing the Sheria position' and Falls Map 4. The 12th Light Horse Regiment moved up to within 1 mile (1.6 km) of the Wadi Sheria to the east of Sheria, where orders were received at 12:00, to go into action north of Sheria to cover the reorganisation of the infantry. While orders were being received, the horses were given "a few minutes" to have a drink in the wadi before they continued their approach.

The 11th Light Horse Regiment commanded by Major P.J. Bailey advanced on the left, with the 12th Light Horse Regiment commanded by Lieutenant Colonel D. Cameron, on the right, had ridden towards the wadi crossing with shrapnel bursting over the trotting horses. Then leading squadrons cantered up the steep tracks on the other side of the wadi into machine gun and heavy rifle fire at effective range. At 12:45 the 12th Light Horse Regiment was held up by machine gun and rifle fire while the HAC battery shelled the Ottoman rearguard position, 0.5 miles (0.80 km) north of Sheria. Their regimental commander ordered one of his squadrons to dismount and their horses sent back, while the men advanced on foot. A second squadron, galloping forward about 500 yards (460 m), also dismounted and began firing their rifles at the rearguard position. On the left, the lines of the 60th London Division were not far from the wadi, and here two squadrons of the 11th Light Horse Regiment, advanced at the gallop in the face of the strong opposing fire.

"The Regiment was attacking a redoubt held by machine guns and rifles, and covered from behind by a big gun. As usual, the approach was open, bare and absolutely barren of any cover. Our troop was ordered to charge the redoubt. The officer led his men straight in at the gallop, and one man only returned, who was wounded in the charge, and wheeled off back to his own lines." "[T]he purely frontal attack ... was held up," under very heavy fire, when the order was given to dismount and the led horses were galloped to the rear. The two light horse regiments continued their advance dismounted, but were only able to capture a few hundred yards in front of the 60th (London) Division before they too were stopped by heavy Ottoman machine gun fire. They remained in this position, during the remainder of the afternoon, although suffering strong counter-attacks.

Meanwhile, one troop of 21 men from the 11th Light Horse Regiment missed the signal, and continued to gallop up to and over the Ottoman trenches, holding only bayonets. With their rifles still on their backs as they dismounted, the Ottoman soldiers opened fire at point blank range, killing 11 men. About 12:30 a troop commanded by Lieutenant A.R. Brierty occupied a position that was strongly opposed by Ottoman machine guns, just at the junction of the small wadi which branches off towards the wadi Kerkity running north-west. After Brierty's troop had galloped passed them the Ottoman defenders turned and fired at the light horsemen dismounting for action, when very heavy fire was opened on them "from front and right and left and rear almost annihilating the troop." (Note: The serious weakness of this light horse attack was recognised, and in January 1918 mounted swordsmanship began to be taught in the Australian Mounted Division, while the division was in rest camp at Deir el Belah. The chief instructor, an officer of the 5th Mounted Brigade trained six lieutenants, 2nd lieutenants, sergeants and a couple of corporals. While two of the corporals were sent to Junior Officers' School, the remainder became qualified instructors on 28 February 1918. [12th Light Horse Regiment War Diary February 1918 AWM4-10-17-13 Appendix I]) On the left, Lieutenant Bartlett's troop came to assist with Hotchkiss machine gun and rifle fire when one German officer and 20 Ottoman infantry were hit. Brierty's troop suffered 11 killed and the 5 wounded included Brierty and Sergeant Thistlewaite and one trooper, who were the only ones to survive. By 13:00 they were held up by heavy rifle and machine gun fire when Lieutenant Brierty's troop of the 11th Light Horse Regiment galloped over a trench, the occupants of which raised their hands, but opened fire again once the troop had passed, catching the troop in converging fire. The whole troop was killed or wounded except two troopers. Lieutenant Bartlett's troop "came to assist" with Hotchkiss and rifle fire "accounting for one German officer and 20 Ottoman soldiers.

One man lay wounded "just under the parapet" while a sergeant and two troopers managed to escape back to the infantry and light horse lines. All the riderless horses started grazing in between the two lines of combatants. "Turks think this is a grand chance to collect some Australian remounts. We think otherwise. I organize a competition between the two right–hand guns (prize 50 piastres) to see who can knock off most Turks without hitting horses. The Turks don't get any remounts." At 14:15, touch was established by the 11th Light Horse Regiment with the 4th Light Horse Brigade, when the situation was reported, and support from machine guns and artillery, was requested for the left flank. When the artillery start shelling the Ottoman rearguard position, they also "make it unpleasant for the wounded Australian [near the enemy parapet] ... and he makes a run for it. Turks get him with m.g. fire when is about halfway back to our lines. Padre and another fellow dash out to bring him in but are shot down." "Padre Dunbar ... and the stretcher bearer made a run for it. They reached the trooper and raised his shoulders. Simultaneously the three were hit. The wounded man was killed. The Padre was hit in the groin and abdomen, and the stretcher bearer in the hand. The latter made a run for it and reached our lines without further hurt. No one could reach Captain Dunbar who died of wounds before dusk." ... All along the track small mounds and a rough cross bear silent record to the fact that this land has once again been bought with blood.

=== Capture of Sheria ===
Desert Mounted Corps reported at 14:40 that the Australian Mounted Division was "directed on Kh Buteihah" and that the infantry fight was still progressing to the north of Sheria hospital, 1 mile (1.6 km) north of Tel el Sheria. It appeared the Ottoman defenders were reinforcing their line and bringing up an abandoned anti-aircraft gun at 15:00. Twenty minutes later, the 179th Brigade (60th Division) was approaching the left flank. Chauvel had ordered this infantry brigade, which had not taken part in the earlier fighting, to capture the strong Ottoman rearguard, which had stopped the combined light horse and infantry attacks. At 17:00 an infantry brigade began to attack the same position the 11th Light Horse Regiment had been attacking from the south. As they moved across the open ground just south of the Wadi Sheria heavy rifle and machine gun fire covered their advance. This attack "relieved the situation", pushed back the Ottoman defenders, who retired as a consequence. The 2/14th and 2/15th London battalions, moved across the Wadi esh Sheria at 17:00 to attack with the bayonet capturing the position just on dark. They captured the Ottoman rearguard position at Sheria and pushed them out of the high ground facing west, suffered 24 casualties during this attack. (Note: According to Gullett's sketch map the Londoners were already across both the Wadi esh Sheria and the Wadi Sadely. (See Gullett's Sketch Map p. 432))

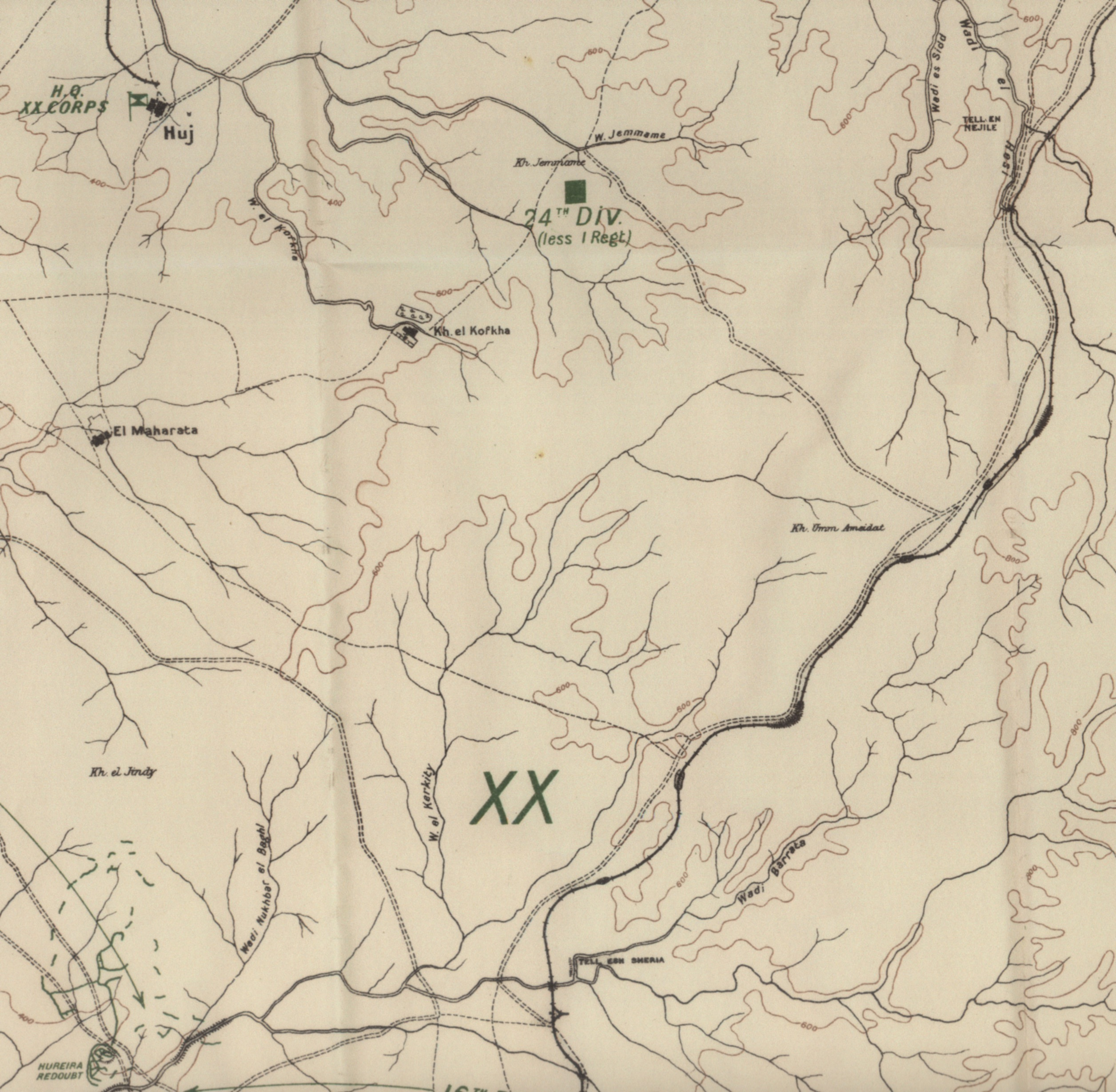
Falls Map 4 Detail: shows positions of Sheria, Jemmameh and Huj

Meanwhile, the 5th Mounted Brigade had taken cover in the Wadi Barrata, east of and parallel to the railway, and in other tributaries of the Wadi esh Sheria towards the east, during the day. Fitzgerald sent a message to Australian Mounted Divisional headquarters asking to advance to the right of the 4th Light Horse Brigade, to seek the gap found by the Anzac Mounted Division. At 15:15 the 4th Light Horse Regiment was sent to Kh. Zara to join the 5th Mounted Brigade's attack on the position. At 16:45 permission was received. Meanwhile, the 3rd Light Horse Brigade, which had watered at Karm during the morning, had ridden about 12 miles (19 km) from the southwest, via Imleih and Irgeig to be in the process of crossing the Wadi esh Sheria, as the 5th Mounted Brigade, "cantering in lines of squadrons", to begin their advance at 17:20. However, the mounted brigade was overtaken by darkness, the sun having set at 16:47 and the moon, just past the last quarter, would not rise for some seven hours. The leading regiment, the Gloucester Yeomanry lost direction and was fired on from the west, so the brigade returned to the Wadi Barrata. (Note: The light horse charge at Beersheba had created 'a spirit of rivalry and emulation,' but the Yeomanry brigade lost two opportunities, to participate in the Sheria charge, if they had continued their advance instead of going to water, they may have surprised the Yildirim Army Group and achieved a great victory. [Wavell p. 126]) Meanwhile, the 3rd Light Horse Brigade, advanced along the railway line to gain touch with the 2nd Light Horse Brigade (Anzac Mounted Division) at 19:30.

The 4th Light Horse Brigade had been placed under orders of Desert Mounted Corps at 16:20. When the infantry took over at 18:00 the brigade withdrew from the firing line, and all troops not actually in the front line, were withdrawn to bivouac at 19:00 south of the Wadi Sheria and east of the railway, the brigade having suffered 15 killed and 14 wounded. At 18:30 orders were received from the 4th Light Horse Brigade to withdraw and bivouac south of Sheria which was reached an hour later. Killed in action were Chaplain Captain Dunbar and 12 troopers. Major Vernon, Lieutenant Brierty and 12 troopers were wounded, while 19 horses were killed and three wounded. The 12 wounded, who arrived after dark at the 4th Light Horse Field Ambulance, continued to be treated until midnight, by which time the field ambulance was out of contact with their brigade, divisional headquarters and their casualty clearing station. At 19:00 the 12th Light Horse Regiment commenced watering in the Wadi Sheria where engineers had set up canvas troughs etc. pumping "the water from holes sunk in the soakage." The regiment finished watering at 22:00 and bivouacked 1 mile (1.6 km) south of the Wadi esh Sheria on the east side of the railway. One trooper was killed in action during the day.

== Aftermath ==
The Ottoman XXII Corps was not defeated, but skillfully conducted a tactical retreat, demonstrating both operational and tactical mobility. The Yildirim Army Group had marched through the night, to gain distance and time to establish a light entrench line, behind which they resisted the EEF advance all day. Their further withdrawals were aided by their falling back on their lines of communication including railways, to eventually occupy strongly entrenched defences in the Judean Hills. While the sacrifice of the Ottoman rearguards delayed the pursuit and saved the Ottoman defenders from encirclement and destruction, the Gaza-Beersheba line was eventually completely overrun and 12,000 Ottoman soldiers would be captured.

Meanwhile, at 06:00 on 8 November the 4th Light Horse Brigade horses were watered at the Sheria water tower and rations and forage issued. Orders were received at 07:30 for the brigade to advance at 09:00 in a northerly direction up the Wadi Sudeh. After briefly halting at 13:00 they reached Huj at 17:30, while a regimental escort sent back for the rations wagons arrived at 02:00 on 9 November. The pursuit by the Anzac and Australian Mounted Divisions north across the southern Palestine maritime plain, eventually ended some 50 miles (80 km) north, after the Ottoman line of defense had been broken at Sheria. By 9 December the EEF advance would take them to Jerusalem.
