= Tell Fara =

Tell Fara may refer to:

- The site of Shuruppak, an ancient Sumerian city
- Tell el-Farah (South), an archeological site associated with the Philistines
