= Sharuhen =

Ancient town

Sharuhen (Hebrew: שָׁרוּחֶן) was an ancient town in the Negev Desert or perhaps in Gaza. Following wars against the Hyksos in Egypt in the second half of the 16th century BCE, Sharuhen became a target, which some scholars argue was a city under Hyksos control. The armies of Pharaoh Ahmose I seized and razed the town after a three-year siege. The precise location of the town is uncertain and several archaeological sites have been suggested as being Sharuhen.

== History ==
M8 D21 Z1 M16 N35 G1 N25
šrḥnꜣ
in hieroglyphs
Era: New Kingdom
(1550–1069 BC)

The destruction of Sharuhen was merely the first stage of a new policy of pre-emptive warfare waged by the Egyptians. Because the Egyptians of the 17th Dynasty felt deeply humiliated by the 15th and 16th Dynasty rule of the Hyksos (ca. 1650 BCE – ca. 1540 BCE), the Theban dynasty launched an ambitious war, led by Seqenenre Tao, against the foreign king, Apepi, to reclaim lost territory. Though his own campaign to expel the Hyksos from Egypt failed, and he himself was killed in battle, his son, Kamose, launched an attack on the Hyksos capital of Avaris.

It was his much younger brother, Ahmose I, however, who finally succeeded in capturing Avaris, razing it, and expelling the Hyksos rulers from Egypt altogether.

The profound insult of the foreign rule to the honour and integrity of Egypt could be corrected, and its recurrence prevented, only by extending Egypt's hegemony over the Asiatics to the north and east of Egypt. Ahmose I engaged in a retaliative three-year siege of Sharuhen, thereby launching an aggressive policy of pre-emptive warfare. The town fell soon after the siege, ending the power of the Hyksos. His victories were maintained by his son, Amenhotep I, Thutmose I, and then continued by the period's greatest expansionist, Thutmose III, who extended Egyptian influence as far as the Mitanni Kingdom in the north and Mesopotamia in the east, pushing the borders of the Egyptian empire further than ever before.

Sharuhen's name is also inscribed on the Bubastite Portal gate in Karnak that records the conquests and military campaigns c. 925 BC of Shoshenq I, of the Twenty-second Dynasty.

Sharuhen is mentioned in the bible in Joshua 19:6 in the description of the allotment of the Tribe of Simeon.

== Identification ==
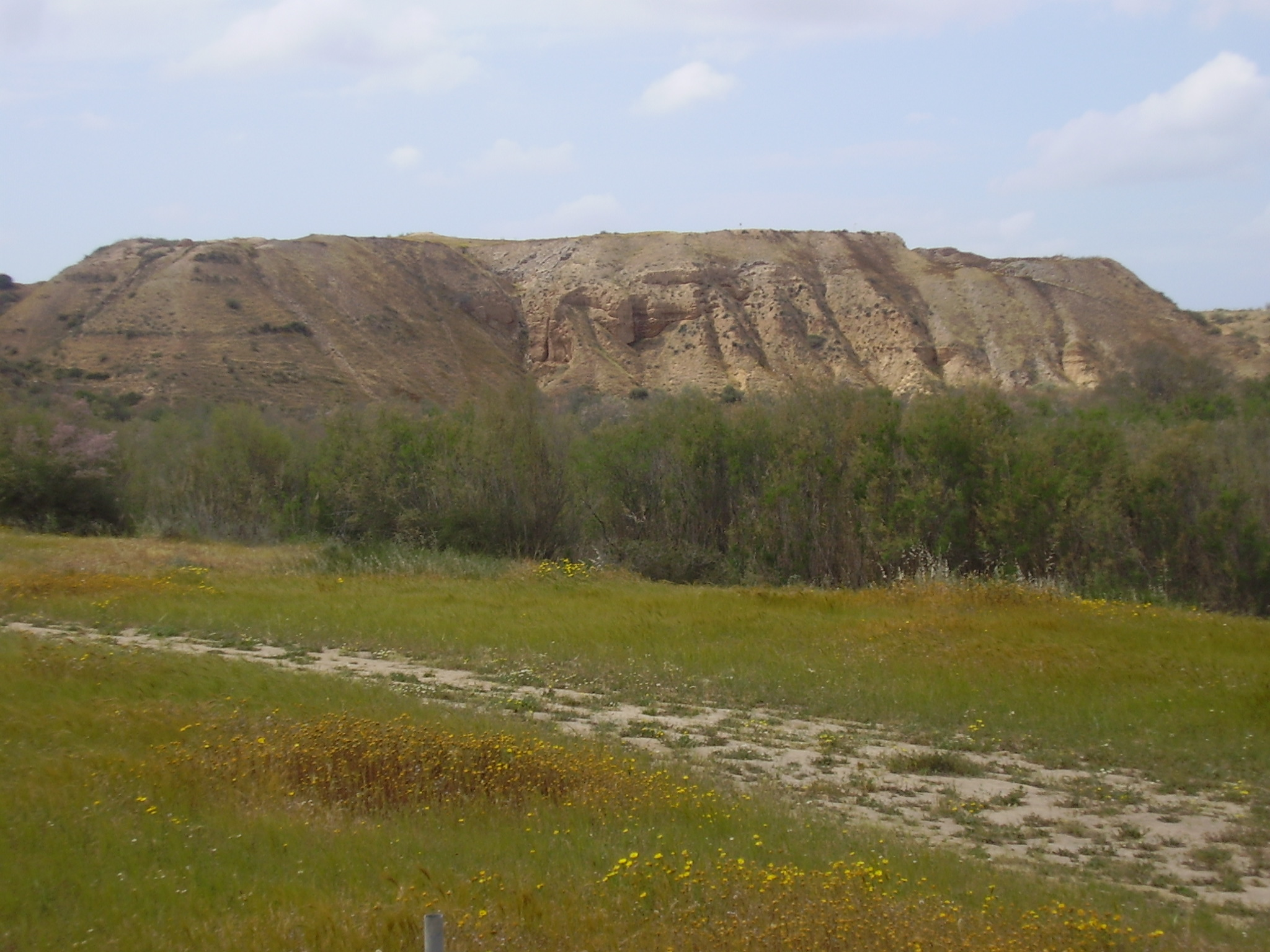
Tell el-Farah South is one of the sites considered to possibly be Sharuhen.

The following sites, all within the same small area along the Nahal Besor and Nahal Gerar rivers, have been identified as possibly being ancient Sharuhen;

- Many scholars today believe that Tell el-Far'ah (South) (31°16′55″N 34°28′57″E), situated on Nahal Besor near the border with Gaza, was Sharuhen. Farah south was first excavated by Flinders Petrie in the late 1920s. He first identified the site as Beth-Pelet (Joshua 15:27) and published the excavation reports under the names Beth-Pelet I - II. It was William F. Albright that laid the basis for identification of Tell Farah south as Sharuhen.
- Flinders Petrie also excavated Tell el-Ajjul (31.467665°N 34.404297°E), in the Gaza area, in the 1930s. He thought Ajjul was the ancient town of Gaza, a theory that has since been partially misproven. The archaeologist Aharon Kempinski proposed identifying Ajjul with Sharuhen in the 1970s. Excavations at Ajjul were resumed in 1999 by a Swedish-Palestinian team under the directors Peter M. Fischer and Moain Sadeq.
- Anson Rainey proposed Tel Heror, along the Nahal Gerar near the border with Gaza, and about 15 km northeast of Farah south, (31.382117°N 34.606522°E) as the site of Sharuhen, as well. This identification is also supported by Donald Redford, because of the site's immense size and important geographical position.

== Bibliography ==
- Stiebing, William H. Jr. (2009). Ancient Near Eastern History and Culture (2nd ed.). Routledge. ISBN 978-0-321-42297-2.
- John Baines; Jaromír Málek (2000). Cultural atlas of Ancient Egypt. Checkmark Books. ISBN 978-0-8160-4036-0.
- Margaret Bunson (2002). Encyclopedia of ancient Egypt. Infobase Publishing. ISBN 978-0-8160-4563-1.
- Fischer, P.M. and Sadeq, M. Tell el-Ajjul 1999. A Joint Palestinian-Swedish Field Project: First Season Preliminary Report. Egypt and the Levant 10, 2000, 211–226.
- Fischer, P.M. and M. Sadeq. Tell el-Ajjul 2000. Second Season Preliminary Report. Egypt and the Levant 12: 109–153.
- Fischer, P.M. The Preliminary Chronology of Tell el-Ajjul: Results of the Renewed Excavations in 1999 and 2000, 263–294, in: Manfred Bietak (2000). The synchronisation of civilisations in the Eastern Mediterranean in the second millennium B.C.: proceedings of an international symposium at Schloss Haindorf, 15th-17th of November 1996 and at the Austrian Academy, Vienna, 11th-12th of May 1998. Verlag der Österreichischen Akademie der Wissenschaften. ISBN 978-3-7001-2936-3.
- Fischer, P.M. The Chronology of Tell el-cAjjul, Gaza. pp 253–265 in: David A. Warburton (2009). Times Up! Dating the Minoan Eruption of Santorini: Acts of the Minoan Eruption Chronology Workshop, Sandbjerg, November 2007. Danish Institute at Athens. ISBN 978-87-7934-024-4.
- Quirke, Stephen; Spencer, Jeffrey; The British Museum Book of ancient Egypt; Thames and Hudson, New York; 1992
