= Gerar =

Ancient city in the southern Levant

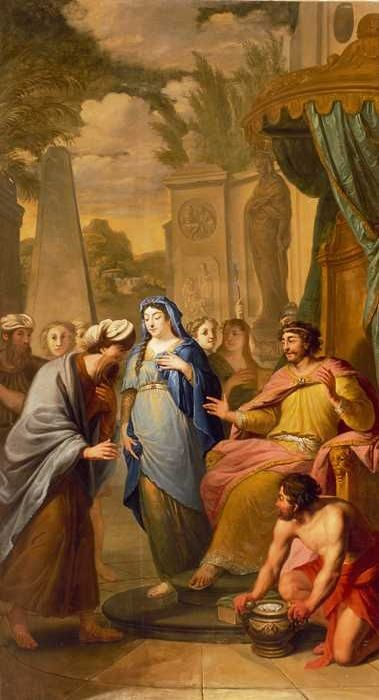
Abimelech, king of Gerar, returns Sarah to Abraham; painting by Elias van Nijmegen (1667–1755), Museum Rotterdam

Gerar (Hebrew: גְּרָר Gərār, "lodging-place") was an ancient city and district in the southern Levant, located in what is today south-central Israel. It is mentioned in the Book of Genesis (traditionally set in the Middle Bronze Age, c. 2000–1700 BCE) and later in the Second Book of Chronicles. In the patriarchal narratives, Gerar is depicted as being ruled by non-Israelite elites; its later association with Philistines reflects a subsequent historical period (following the arrival of Aegean-origin populations in the region during the Iron Age, c. 1200–1000 BCE).

== Identification ==
According to the International Standard Bible Encyclopedia, the biblical valley of Gerar (Genesis 26:17) was probably located in the area of a valley known in Arabic as Wady Sheri'a, and in Modern Hebrew as Nahal Gerar. Most commentators see the mound of Tel Haror (Hebrew) or Tell Abu Hureyra (Arabic) as representing the ancient Gerar.

Some older commentaries, such as Smith's Bible Dictionary, stated simply that Gerar was located "south of Gaza". Saadia Gaon, a ninth century rabbinical source, identified Gerar with Haluza, which is located along the Besor Stream in the Negev. However, according to recent archaeological research, Haluza only dates to the period of the Nabataean Kingdom.

== Biblical accounts ==
The town of Gerar appears in both the Book of Genesis and the Second Book of Chronicles.

Gerar appears in two of the three wife-sister narratives in Genesis. Abraham and Isaac each stayed at Gerar, near what became Beersheba, and each passed his wife off as his sister, leading to complications involving Gerar's Philistine king, Abimelech (Genesis 20:1 and Genesis 26:1). Abraham explains in Genesis 20 that his action arose out of concern that "there is no fear of God at all in this place".

The account in Genesis 26:1-6 suggests that Isaac intended to continue from Gerar to Egypt, in order to avoid the famine reportedly experienced in Canaan. Abraham had gone down to Egypt in similar earlier circumstances, but in a vision, God to him not to go there, and more specifically to remain within the promised land: "as he was the seed to whom the land of Canaan was promised, he was directed not to leave it". He therefore settled in Gerar.

Regarding Abimelech, the aggadah identifies the two references to the king as two separate people, the second being the first Abimelech's son, and that his original name was Benmelech ["son of the King"], but he changed his name to his father's, meaning "my father is king".

In 2 Chronicles 14:12-15, relating to later events, Gerar and its surrounding towns figure in the account of King Asa's defeat of Zerah's vast Cushite forces.

== See also ==
- Tell Jemmeh
