= Environment Quality Authority (Palestine) =

Ministry in Palestine

- الهيئة العامة للبيئة

Agency overview
- Formed: 10 December 1996
- Jurisdiction: Palestine
- Headquarters: Ramallah, Palestine
- Minister responsible: Adalah Atira, Minister of Environment
- Agency executive: Eng. Adnan Ghannam, Director General
- Website: environment.ps/en/home-eng/

The Environment Quality Authority (MEnA; Arabic: الهيئة العامة للبيئة) is the central authoritative body for all environmental issues in Palestine. It is the umbrella under which all environmental regulations, projects and strategies are created and implemented. MEnA's primary concern is the conservation and sound use of the natural environment. It seeks to maintain and safeguard the environment with plans to protect human health, curb and reduce the depletion of natural resources, combat desertification, prevent the aggravation of air and water pollution, promote environmental awareness and ensure achievement of sustainable urban development.

== Brief historical development ==
On 10 December 1996, the President of the Palestinian National Authority, Yasser Arafat, established the first organization in the State responsible for protecting the natural environment and mitigating effects on human health: the Palestinian Environmental Authority (PEnA). PEnA was created in parallel with the Oslo II Accords, which agreed to establish a number of ministries and authorities aimed at the planning, management and implementation of environmentally beneficial tasks within the Palestinian National Authority. By the end of 1997, a merger was constructed to join PEnA, the Environmental Planning Department and part of the Ministry of Planning. In August 1998, President Arafat appointed a State Minister for Environment, which granted the collaborative more power than the 1997 merger did. The order gave the Minister authorization over PEnA, which eventually displaced the organization and created MEnA by the end of the month.

== Environmental Concerns in Palestine ==
MEnA sees the most significant environmental issues stemming from the shortage of natural resources, and specifically, water. The coupling of high population growth, many years of negligence, prolonged Israeli–Palestinian conflict and poor educational standards have led to detrimental impacts on agriculture and the economy as a whole, a lack of experts and technicians and little to no environmental awareness throughout the community.

=== Link to Palestinian-Israeli conflict ===
MEnA attributes many of Palestine’s water issues to Israel’s occupation of the West Bank since 1967, which the United Nations Development Programme sees as the source of conflict between the two countries. MEnA also sights Israeli occupation as the reason why many Palestinians are sufficient with living a low-quality life with environmental conditions below human dignity.

== Funding ==
External funding for projects comes from the United Nations Development Programme (UNDP), the Environmental Systems Research Institute, the United States government and a variety of international non-profit organizations in the United States and the European Union. Internal funding comes from the Palestinian National Authority, only, and specifically from the Palestinian Adaptation Programme of Action and the Ministry of Planning and Administrative Development.

=== Threats ===
The United States contributed $513 million to the Palestinian Authority in 2011, which was intended to resolve problems in the state other than security issues. The United States threatened to bar all future aid if any of its donation went towards security purposes, if Hamas played any role in its distribution or if Palestine sought statehood at the United Nations.

== Accomplishments ==
- 1996 Development of the Palestinian Environmental Authority; several studies completed: one on biodiversity conservation and another on liquid waste treatment, both accompanied with a strategic action plan
- 1998 Minister Appointed to the Palestinian Environmental Authority, creating the Ministry of Environmental Affairs
- 1999 Palestinian Environmental Strategy Developed, first attempt at strategic planning in environmental sector
- 2000 Study on nature during war, which outlines Israel's effect on Palestinian environment
- 2003 Through the United Nations Environment Programme (UNEP), a desk study published on the state of environment in Palestine
- 2005 Organizational Structure of Environmental Quality Authority (EQA) approved
- 2006 Third national report on biodiversity protection prepared
- 2007 Implementation of projection on integrated management of watershed In Far'a Basin in partnership with the EU and Jordan
- 2008 Reform and development plan on the environment created and approved for implementation between 2009 and 2011
- 2009 Through UNEP, a report developed on environmental impact of the latest Israeli War on Gaza; report published on the assessment of climate change hazards in Palestine; climate change adaptation strategy developed and published
- Since 2009 Establishment of sectoral working group on environment, includes international donors and national stakeholders; monitoring of environment projects and giving environmental approvals; project implemented to create the natural reserve in Wadi Gaza; representation of Palestine in several int'l conferences and meetings on environment protection; and working towards national strategy for solid waste management.

== Limitations ==
Despite these accomplishments, there are multiple planned activities that have not and will not be completed for several reasons: political and administrative boundaries, lack of funding, shortage of necessary equipment and laboratories and a lack of specialized experts and technicians. In reference to the Palestinian Reform and Development Plan of 2008-2010 (PRDP), MEnA named 32 priorities in the environmental sector that it saw as most worth the time, effort and financing. But the Environmental Sector Strategy plan of 2010 only adopted one of the submitted proposals; in fact, the one proposal adopted has not even been implemented due to a lack of financial resources.

Other setbacks to environment projects are more severe issues on the ground, like the current fuel crisis in Gaza. MEnA warns that the current crisis will lead to unavoidable humanitarian and environmental disaster because of its crippling effects on sanitation and water production. It notes that with prolonged absence of fuel in vital sectors, 190 water wells supplying 1.7 million citizens, 4 sewage treatment stations and tens of mechanisms that move 1,500 tons of solid waste from residential areas to landfills will stop functioning. Without immediate international aid, MEnA says, Israeli occupation will not be forced to respect Palestinians, who are in desperate need of basic electricity and fuel.

== Boundaries created by conflict with Israel ==
The situation in the occupied territories is particularly unique because the Palestinian National Authority has very limited control over its own natural resources and general territory. The Oslo II Accord only granted the Palestinian National Authority free control of “2.7% of the West Bank that fall under ‘Area A’ and – within limits – the 25.1% under ‘Area B.’ For the majority of the territory (72.2%) that belongs to the ‘Area C,’ the Palestinian National Authority has no control. This has very practical implications for decisions like designating and accessing nature reserves and protected areas, establishing landfills, drilling wells or constructing sewage treatment plants. Often, such projects can only be undertaken in the ‘Area C,’ as areas A and B are typically densely populated, built-up areas. However, any projects in Area C require the consent and cooperation of Israeli Authorities”.
