= Nahal Gerar =

Wadi and stream in Israel

Coordinates: 31.3983°N 34.4362°E

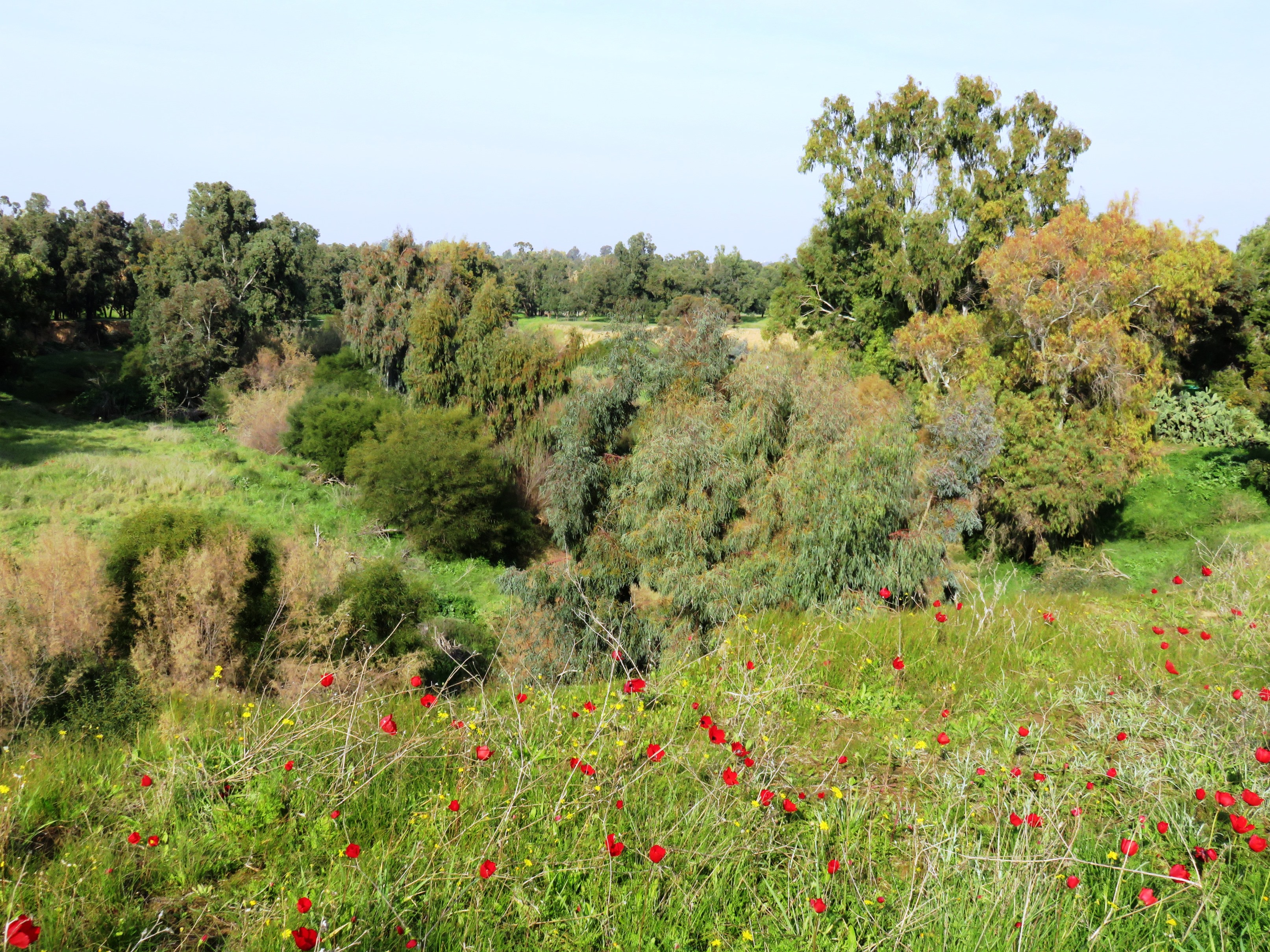
Gerar stream with adjacent vegetation

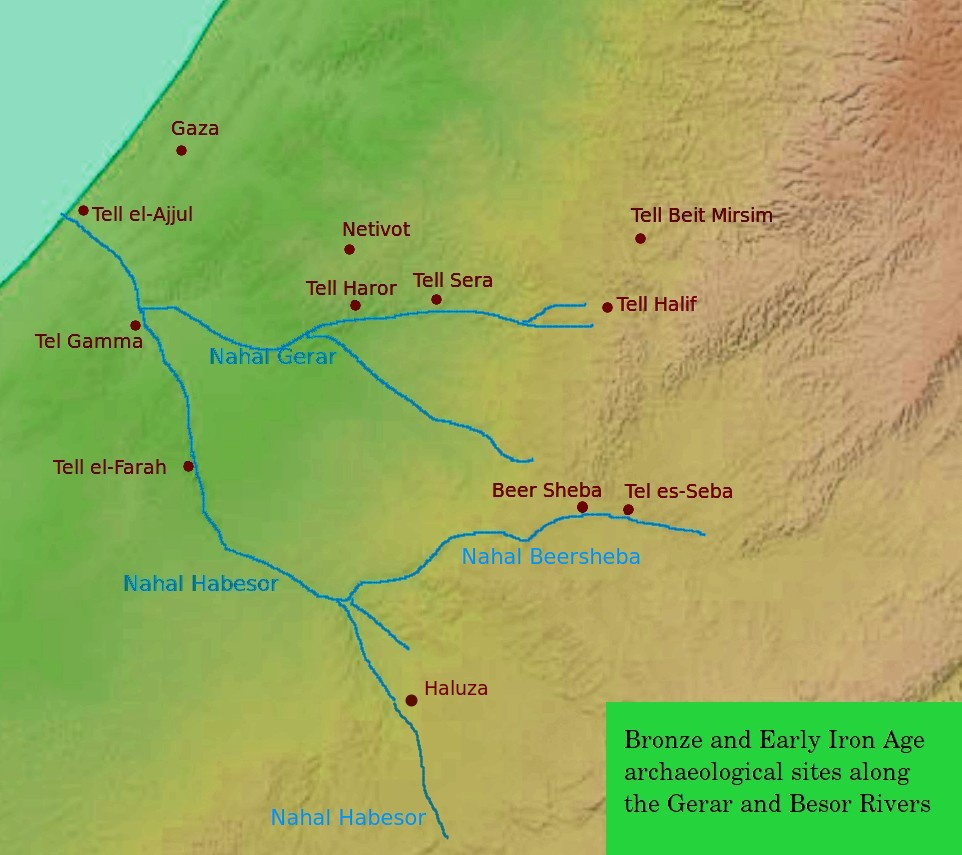
Bronze and Early Iron Age archaeological sites along the Gerar, Be'er Sheva and Besor Streams

Nahal Gerar, also Nachal Grar (Hebrew: נחל גרר), is a wadi in the Negev desert in Israel. Its Arabic name is Wadi esh-Sheri'a (also Wady el Sharia and other variations). Along this wadi, there are several important ancient Bronze Age archaeological sites. During the Early Iron Age this was an area of Philistine settlement.

== Geography ==
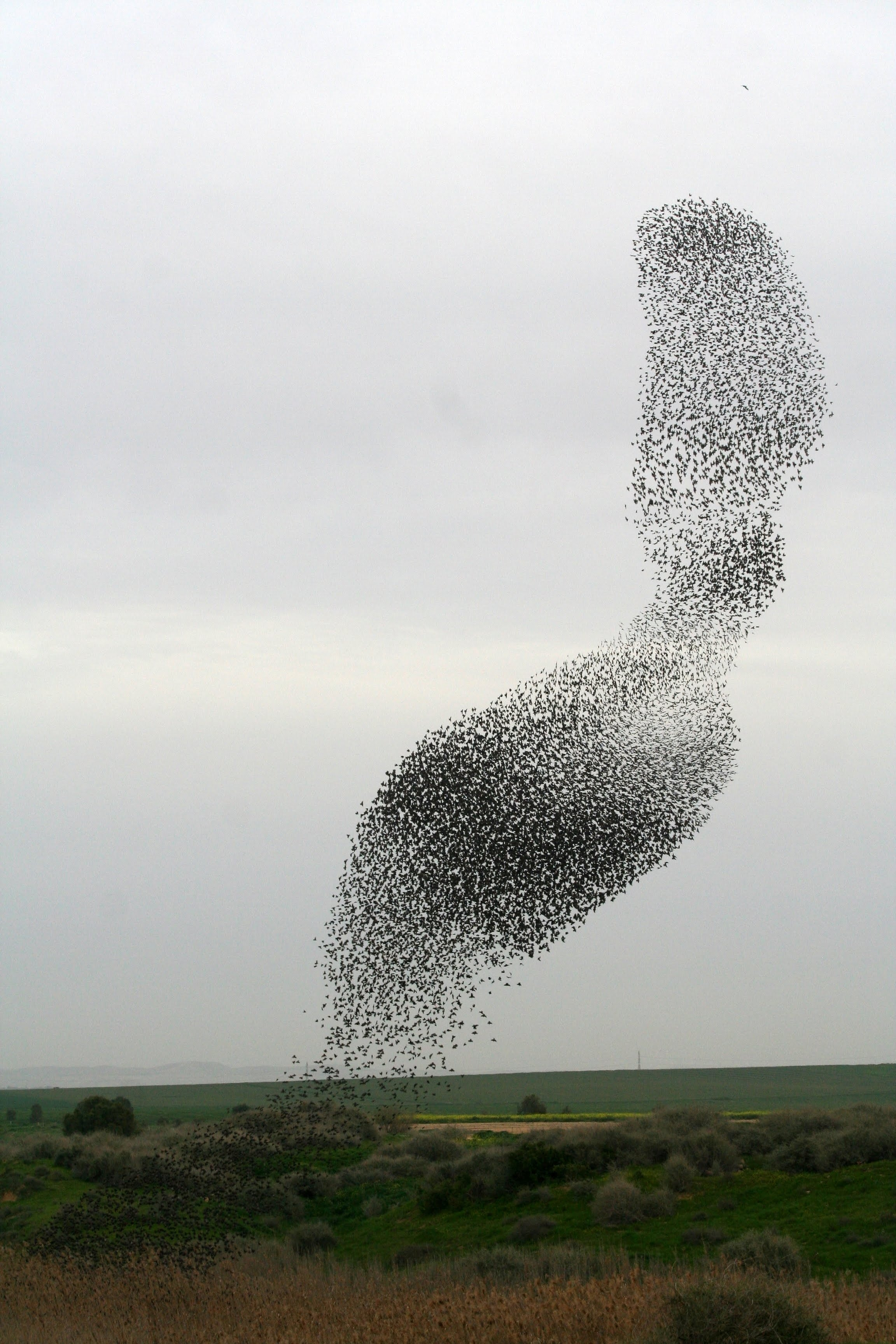
A flock of starlings coming down for the night near Negev Nahal Gerar. At the top right, Eurasian Hobby steering clear of the flock.

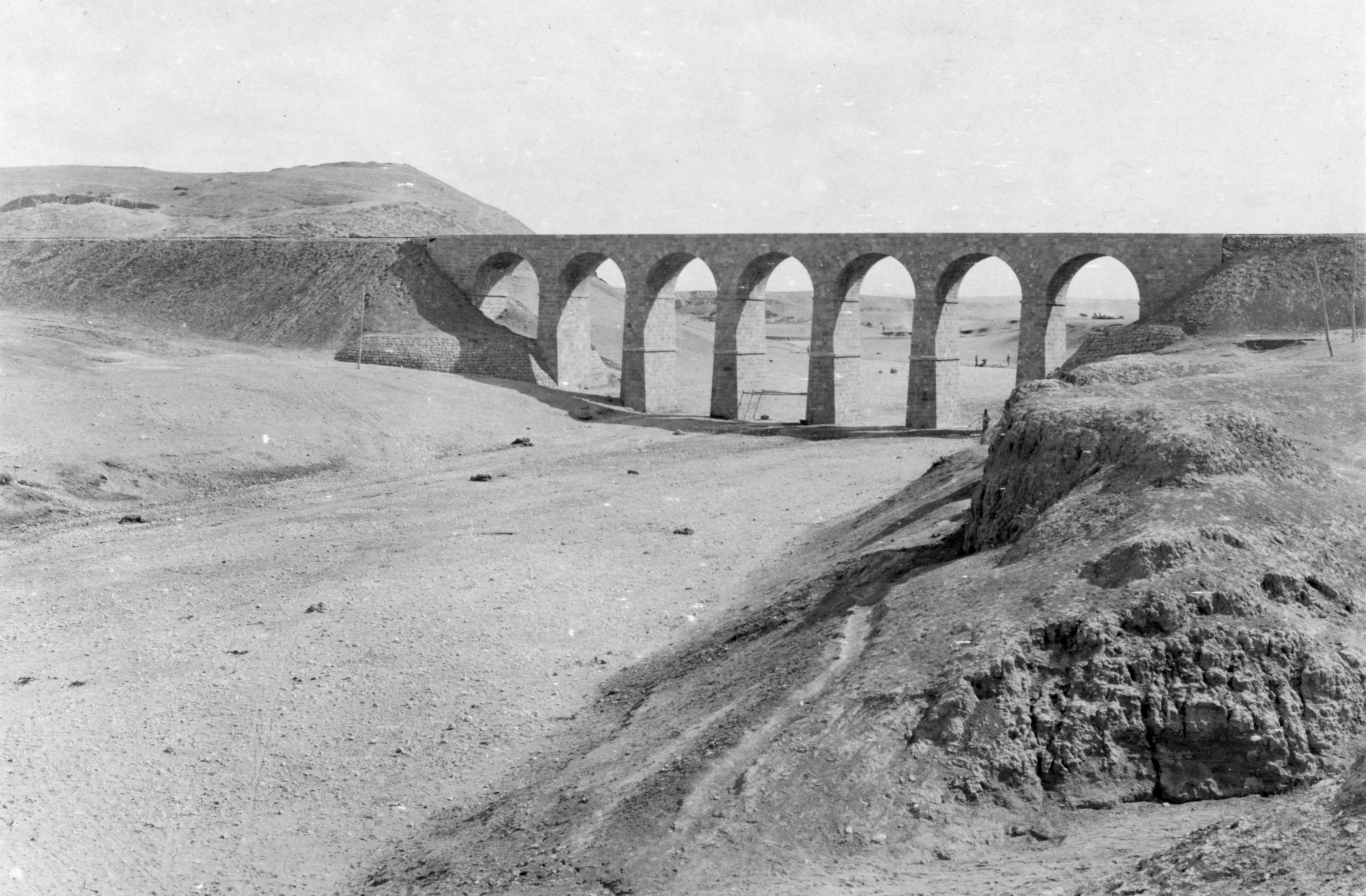
A railway bridge over the dried out Nahal Grar River near Tel Shera - photo from 1917

Nahal Gerar begins on the border between the northern Negev and the southwest foothills of Judaean Mountains, near the village of Lahav (ancient site of Tel Halif). Then the wadi flows west near the city of Lehavim, and along the southern edge of a large Bedouin town of Rahat. Then it flows west along the northwestern edge of the Negev towards the town of Netivot, an agricultural area. Near the village of Re'im, it flows into Nahal Besor, of which it is the main affluent.

=== Nature reserve ===
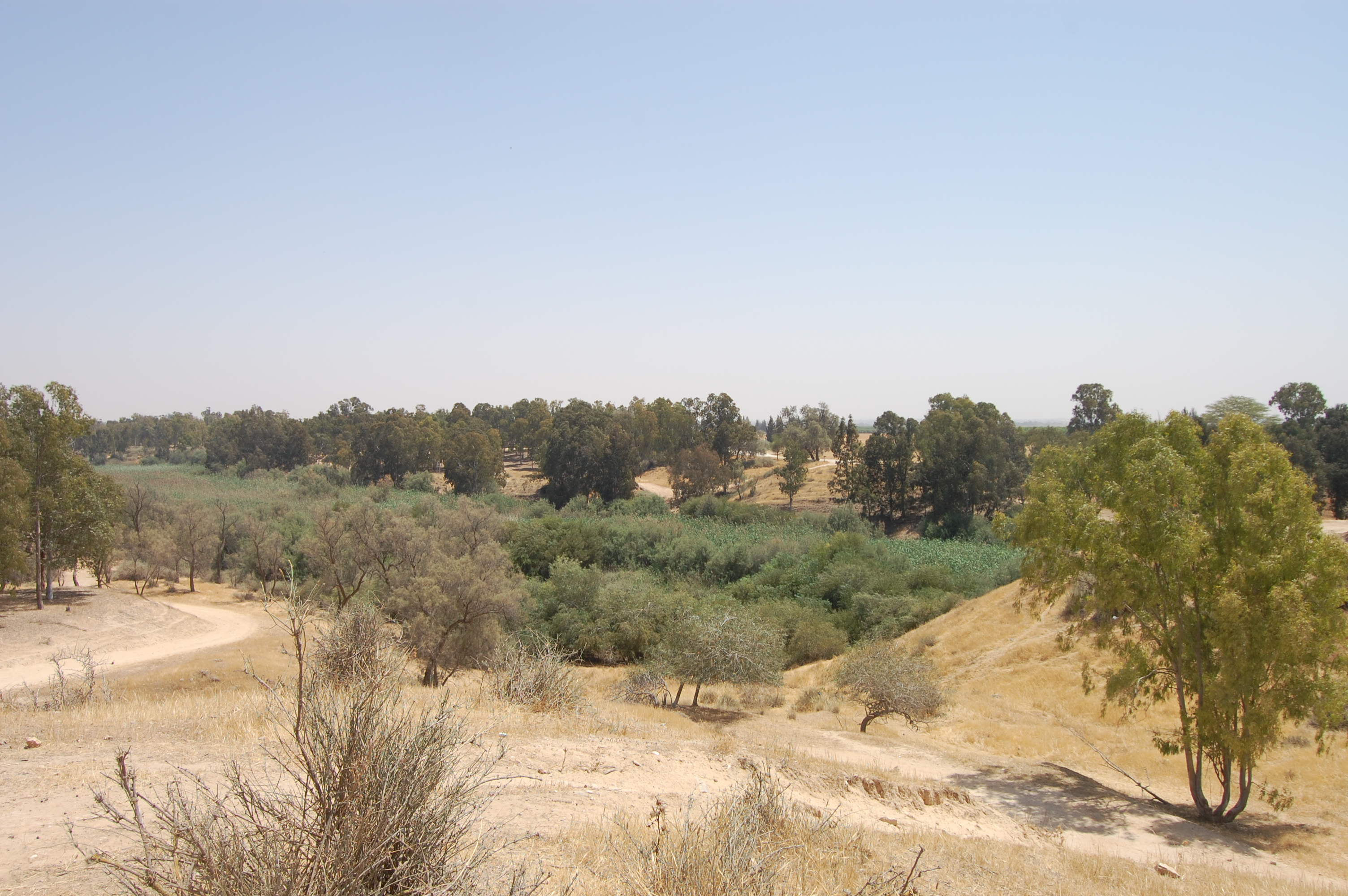
River vegetation in Nahal Gerar, in the area of Gerar Park, not far from Tel Haror identified by some with the biblical Gerar

The lower river area is now part of the Eshkol National Park, a nature reserve used by tourists. Forest have been replanted there, and hiking trails developed.

The "green island" of Nahal Grar is a forest that rises into the Western Negev's farmed loess plains. Thick-stemmed oaks, eucalyptus, olive trees and carob trees are planted there. KKL has paved scenic roads leading to the nature reserve of Nahal Grar on it and the lower part of the reserve. Along the section of the stream, there is a park decorated with various river bushes and tamarix plants.

The reserve consists of two parts. The first has an area of about 2,000 dunams (2 square kilometers) and is located between Rahat and Tidhar, the other has an area of about 5,500 dunams (5.5 square kilometers) and lies between the villages Ranen and Re'im.

== Archaeology ==
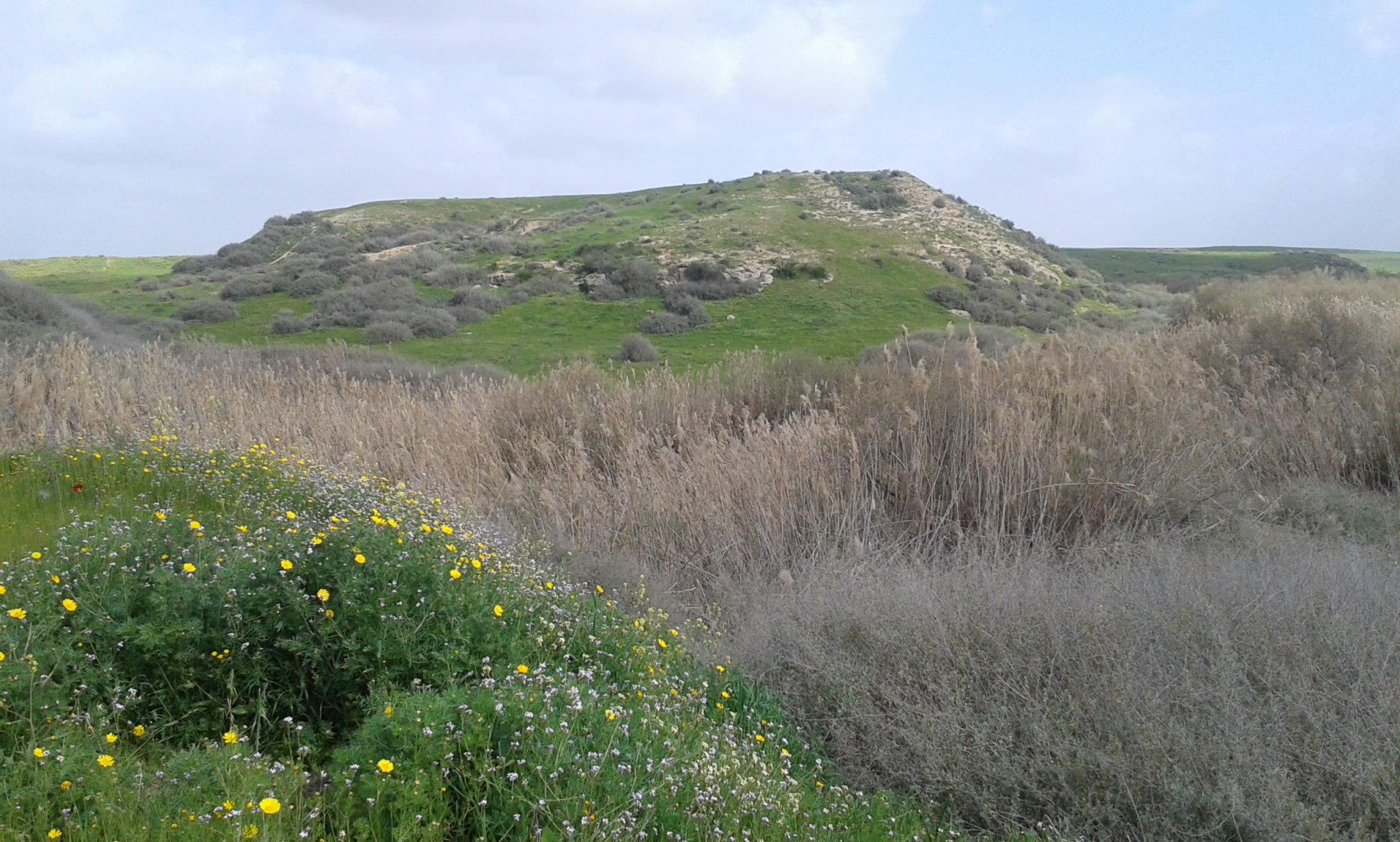
Tel Shera archaeological site along the Gerar river. Looking south from the railway embankment

Along Nahal Gerar, there are several important Bronze Age archaeological sites. An archaeological survey and excavation was conducted in 2010 by Noa Shaul on behalf of the Israel Antiquities Authority (IAA).

The major settlement of this area started at the time of the Egyptian Middle Kingdom, and continued into the New Kingdom, when some significant Egyptian settlements were founded. After the decline of the Egyptian sites, during the Early Iron Age, this area became culturally influenced by the Philistine settlers.

The major sites in this area are Tel Haror/Tell Abu Hareira, and Tel Shera/Tell esh-Sheri'a. Further east along the river, there are also the sites of Tel Halif/Tell el-Khuweilifeh and Tell Beit Mirsim.

Near Tel Haror, in the neighbourhood of the modern town of Tidhar, there are numerous historical mounds, some of them not excavated. Some scholars believe that Tel Haror was the ancient Sharuhen fortress of the Hyksos.

The large ancient site of Tell Jemmeh (Tell Gamma) is located where Nahal Gerar flows into Nahal Besor.

== Biblical connections ==
Nahal Gerar is named after the biblical sites mentioned in the Book of Genesis: "Abraham went thence into the country of Negeb, and settled between Kadesh and Shur; sojourning in Gerar." The city of Gerar is now generally believed to be located at Tel Haror.

Genesis 26:1 records that there was a famine in the land where Abraham's son Isaac lived, "besides the previous famine in Abraham's time, and Isaac went to Abimelech king of the Philistines in Gerar. Although Isaac settled initially in Gerar to avoid the famine, a dispute with the Philistines led him to move away to "the Valley of Gerar", and he settled there.

2 Chronicles 14:12-13 records that "Asa and the people that were with him pursued them unto Gerar; and there fell of the Ethiopians so that none remained alive; for they were shattered before the LORD, and before His host; and they carried away very much booty."

== See also ==
- Battle of Hareira and Sheria
  - Charge at Sheria
- Tel Haror
