= Tell el-Far'ah (South) =

Archaeological site in the northern Negev, Israel

- Shown in Israel
- 31°16′56.8″N 34°28′57.7″E
- Type: Tell
- Location: Israel
- Region: Northern Negev, Israel

Site notes
- Material: Mud brick
- Excavation dates: 1928-29, 1977, 1998-2002
- Archaeologists: Flinders Petrie, Rudolph Cohen, Gunnar Lehmann

Tell el-Far'ah (South), also transliterated Tell el-Fārʿa, is an archaeological site on the bank of HaBesor Stream in the northern Negev region in Israel. It is located between the modern settlements of Ein HaBesor and Urim, some 12 kilometres (7.5 mi) from the modern city of Ofakim and 20 kilometres (12 mi) from Gaza City.

== Archaeology ==
The site runs about 185 meters N to S and about 115 meters E to W with a total area of around 2 hectares, with World War I trenching and modern graves present in some areas. The British Western Negev Expedition surveyed the area around Tell el-Far'ah (South) in 1972 to 1973 finding a Byzantine site 1 kilometer away and a Paleolithic site across the wadi. It was first excavated by Flinders Petrie and E. McDonald for three seasons from 1928 to 1930. An advance team including Olga Tufnell and James Leslie Starkey had arrived in 1927 to begin work. Petrie focused primarily on graves and tombs. Rudolph Cohen directed salvage excavations at the site in 1977. The site was again excavated, after a survey season in 1998, in 1999 (with Claremont Graduate University) and 2002 (with Rostock University) by a team from Ben-Gurion University led by Gunnar Lehmann. Finds included a small ostracon fragment which read "To Our Lord" in an early Canaanite alphabetic script.

== Identification ==
As of 1993, the actual identification was still in dispute.

Flinders Petrie identified the site with Beit Pelet in the territory of the Tribe of Judah. William F. Albright identified the site with Sharuhen, which appears in Egyptian and Biblical sources. N. Na'aman proposed identifying the site with Biblical Shur. E. A. Knauf and H. M. Niemann locate Ziklag at the site.

== History ==
=== Middle Bronze Age ===
The site was lightly occupied beginning in the Middle Bronze Age IIB-IIC/III (c. 1600 BC). The town had fortifications, a city gate, and a moat and is generally identified as a Hyksos settlement.

=== Late Bronze Age ===
==== 18th Dynasty ====
Starting around 1550 BC many of the numerous city-states of southern Canaan came under direct Egyptian control or became vassal states.

==== 19th Dynasty ====
During the 19th dynasty, the area was under direct control of Seti I (1294–1279 BC), Ramesses II (1279–1213 BC), Merneptah (1213–1203 BC). It is believed that the site of Tell el-Far’ah (South) became an Egyptian administrative center and garrison during this time. A large, 600 square meter, monumental building was constructed (called the "Governor’s Residency" by Petrie). It was built of mud bricks on a baked brick foundation using Egyptian methods. Egyptian finds included pottery, scarabs, amulets, and two bowls with Egyptian hieratic inscriptions (related to tax collection). There is scholarly debate of whether Egyptians were living at the site or "Egyptian inspired" locals. Seti II is the last Pharaoh mentioned by finds at the site, before the site was destroyed.

=== Iron Age ===
==== Philistine period ====
The Petrie excavation found a large number of tombs and graves with pottery having a close connection with Mycenae Greek which Petrie termed "Philistine", a designation which has been maintained. These remains lie above a destruction layer which contained a jar shard with the mark of Egyptian pharaoh Seti II (c. 1203 BC to 1197 BC) which sets a "no earlier than" date for the "Philistine" finds.

In Iron I, the fauna of Tell el-Far’ah South was different than that of the Philistine sites, notwithstanding the fact that the material culture was strongly influenced by the Philistine culture.

In Area 1:

- Stratum 1-8b (Iron IB) pottery compared with Philistines and Arad.
- Stratum 1-8a (Iron IIA1) pottery has a distinct regional and local style.
- Stratum 1-7 (Iron IIA2) pottery compared with Philistines and Lachish.
- Stratum 1-6 (Iron IIA3, 800/790 BCE)
- Stratum 1-5 (Iron IIB)

=== Classical Age ===
After a possible break in Neo-Babylonian times the site was lightly occupied in Persian and Hellenistic periods, with somewhat greater activity in the Roman period. Several ostraca were discovered in Tell el-Far'ah during Sir Flinders Petrie's excavations there. One, dated to 300 BCE, recorded a payment to "Shebi the Arab" (ls̆by 'arby), a name that also appears in Safaitic and Nabatean Aramaic inscriptions from other sites in the region.

=== Ottoman period ===
During the Ottoman period, the Bedouin tribe of 'Arab al-Jubarat (عرب الجبارات) dwelled in the area.

== See also ==
- Cities of the ancient Near East
- Nahal Besor
