= Wadi Gaza =

Wadi in southern Israel and Palestine

Wadi Gaza / Besor Stream وادي غزة / נחל הבשור
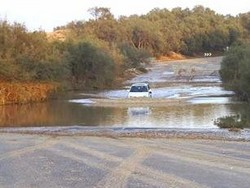
- Besor Stream

Location
- Country: Israel, Palestine

Physical characteristics
- Source
  - location: Negev
  - coordinates: 30°48′46″N 34°43′39″E
- Mouth
  - location: Mediterranean Sea
  - coordinates: 31°27′50″N 34°22′33″E

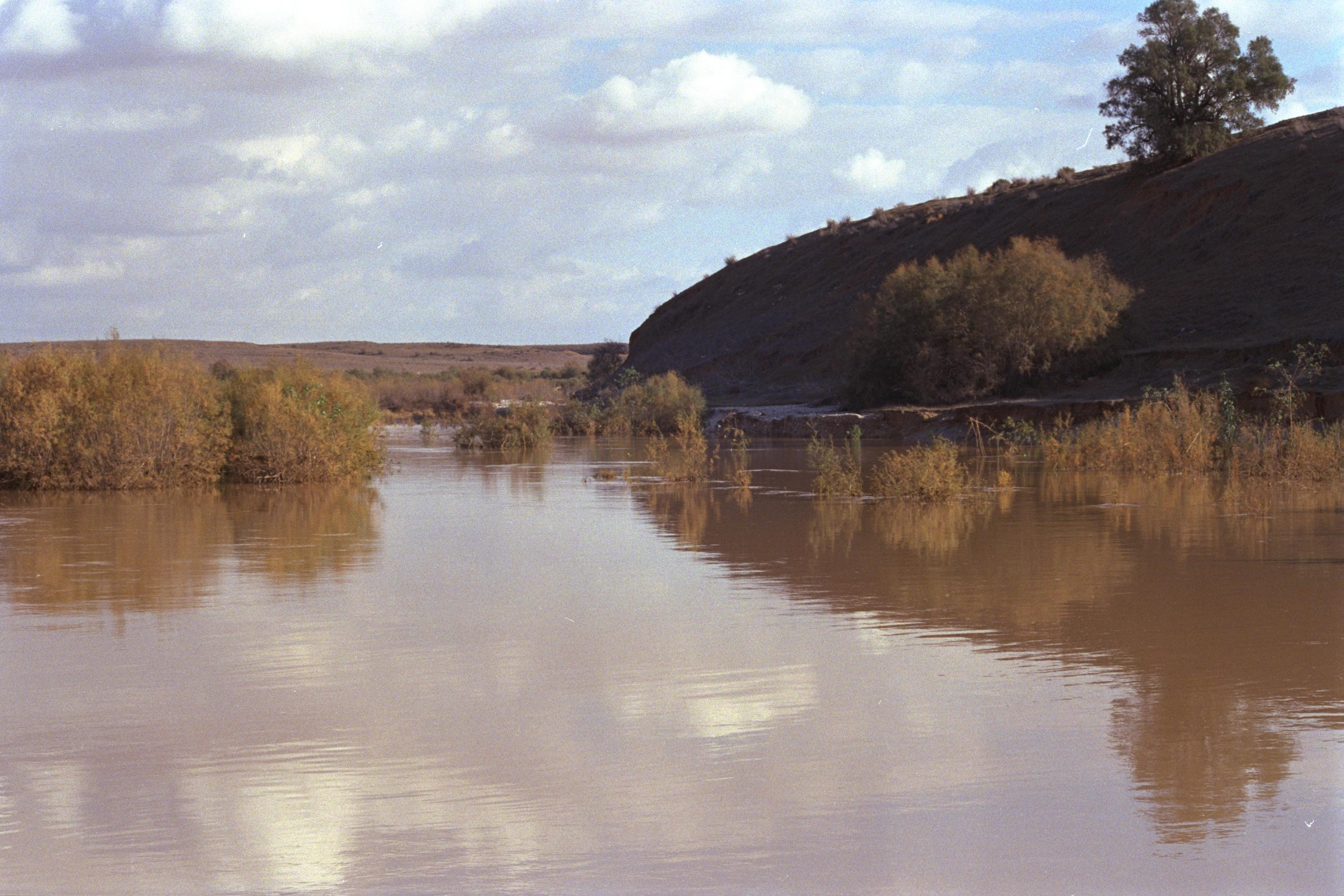
Flooding in the Negev by the Besor stream

Wadi Gaza (Arabic: وادي غزة, romanized: Wadi Ghazza) and Besor Stream (Hebrew: נחל הבשור, romanized: Nahal HaBesor, Ancient Greek: Ἀβεσσά, romanized: Habessá) are parts of a river system in the Gaza Strip in Palestine and the Negev region of Israel. Wadi Gaza is a wadi (river valley) that divides the northern and southern ends of the Gaza Strip, whose major tributary is Besor Stream.

== History ==
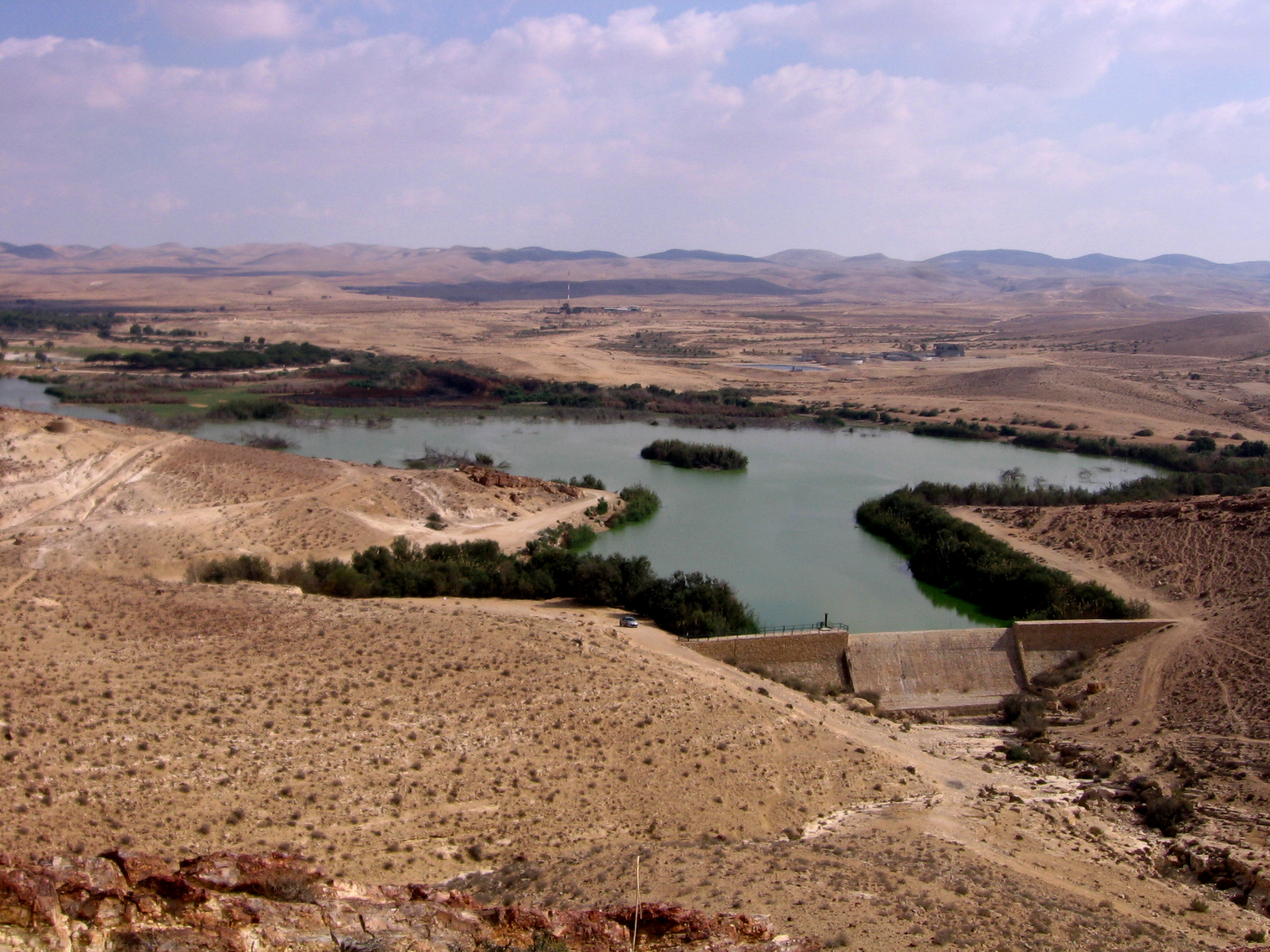
Yeruham Reservoir

Nahal Besor has shown evidence of epipaleolithic sites above paleolithic sediments. Finds of pottery and flints were studied by Ann Roshwalb who found evidence of both Egyptian and late Neolithic occupations. Archaeologists Pierre de Miroschedji and Moain Sadeq suggest that in the late 4th millennium BCE, Egypt's expansion into the southern Levant consisted of a core of permanent settlement with areas of seasonal habitation and Egyptian influence where ancient Egyptians and Canaanites interacted. The permanent core was focused around the wadi, encompassing the settlements at Tell es-Sakan (likely an administrative centre) and En Besor.

In the Old Testament, Besor was a ravine or brook in the extreme south-west of Judah, where 200 of David's men stayed behind because they were faint, while the other 400 pursued the Amalekites.

Around the year 390, a group of monks from Scetis around Silvanus settled in several hermit cells along the watercourse. The community would only gather on Saturdays and Sundays for communal prayer and meals, doing various manual works and prayer during the week. In 520, the so-called monastery of Seridus was founded a bit further south where the famous hermits Barsanuphius and John the Prophet lived.

During the Ottoman period, the Bedouin tribe of 'Arab al-Jubarat (عرب الجبارات) inhabited the area.

Between 1951 and 1954, the Yeruham Dam was built on one of the tributaries of the HaBesor Stream In 2012, Palestine added Wadi Gaza to the tentative list of World Heritage Sites.

In October 2023, as part of the Gaza war, Israel ordered 1.1 million people then living north of the Wadi Gaza bridge to move south.

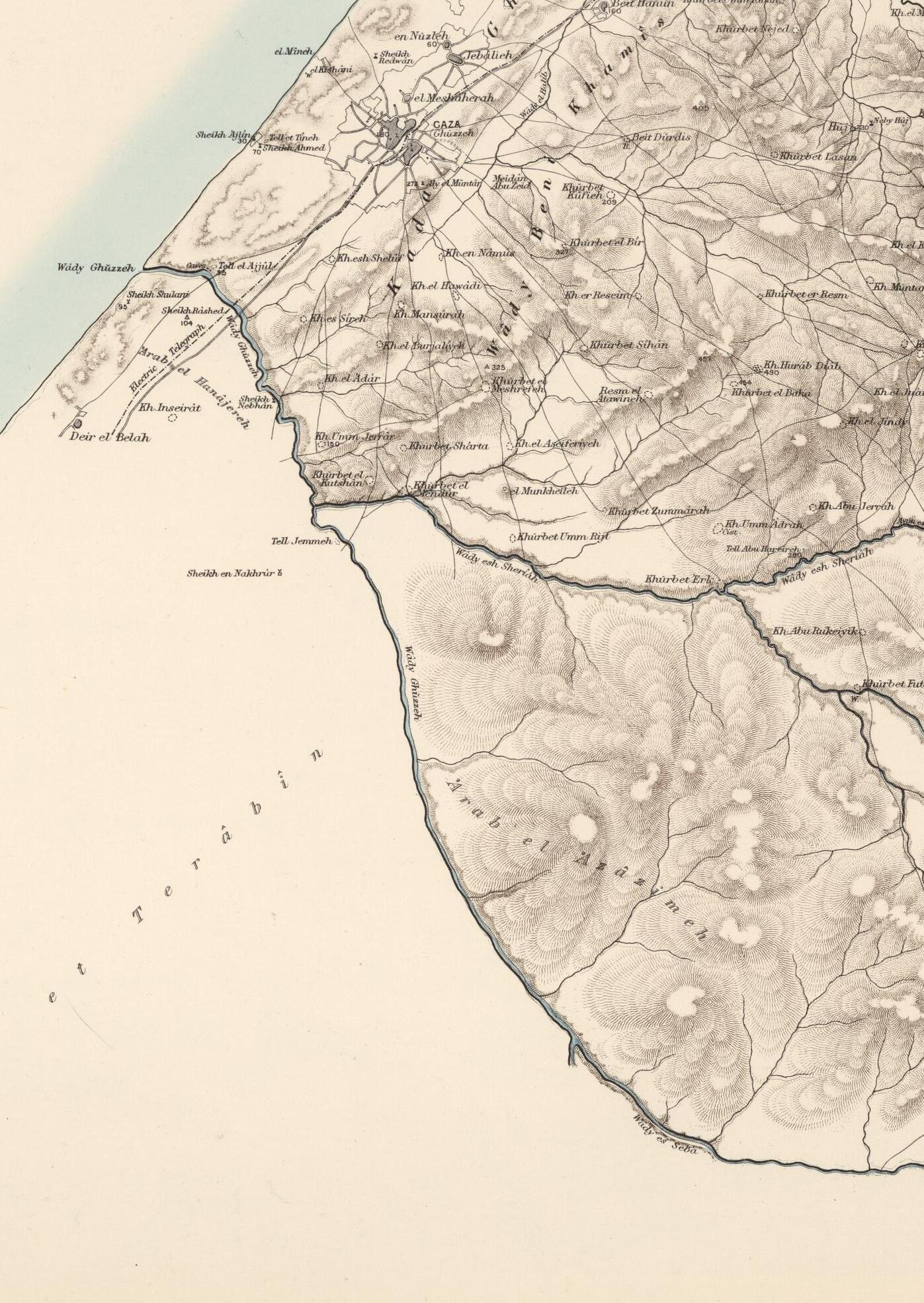
1888

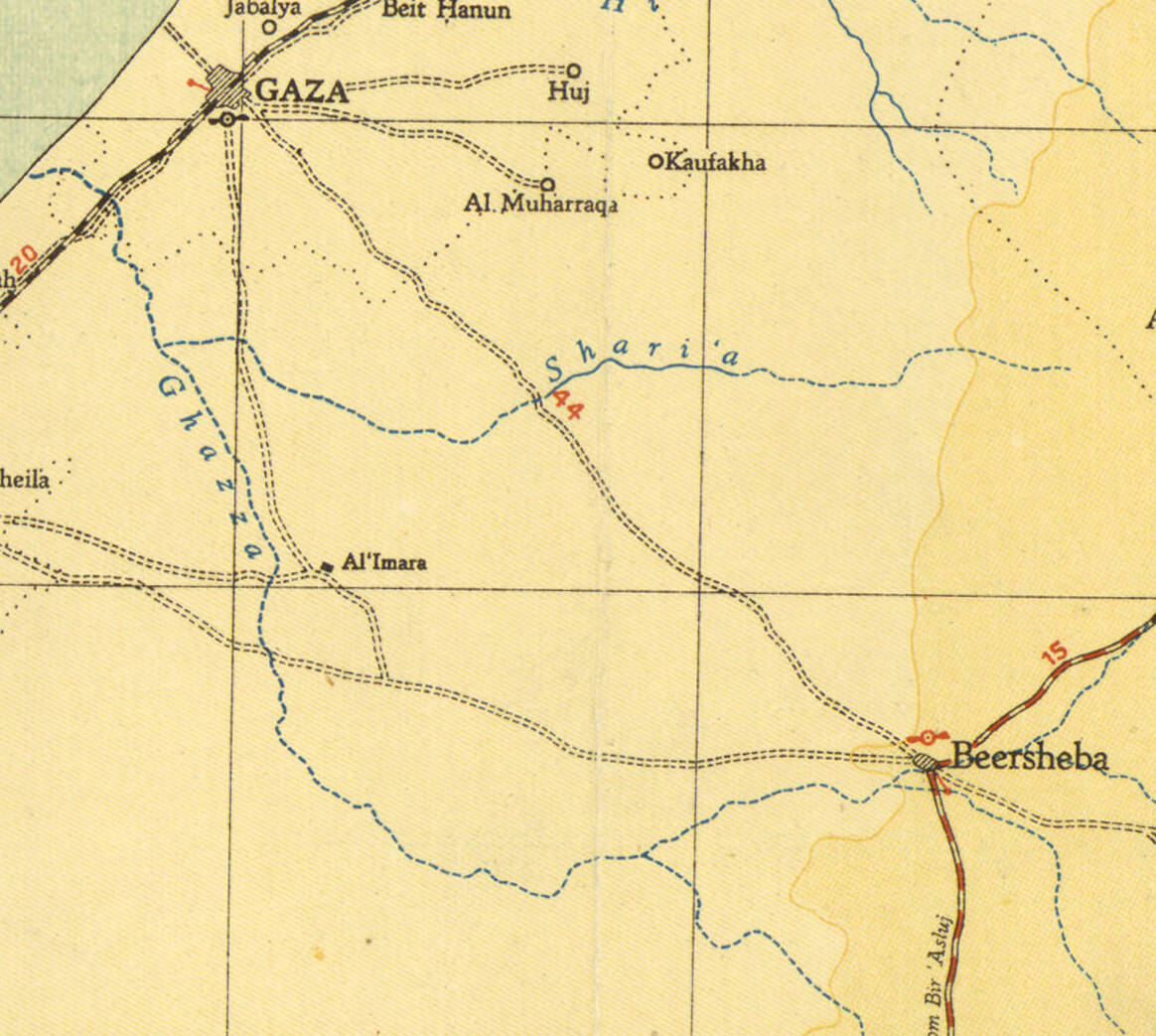
1933

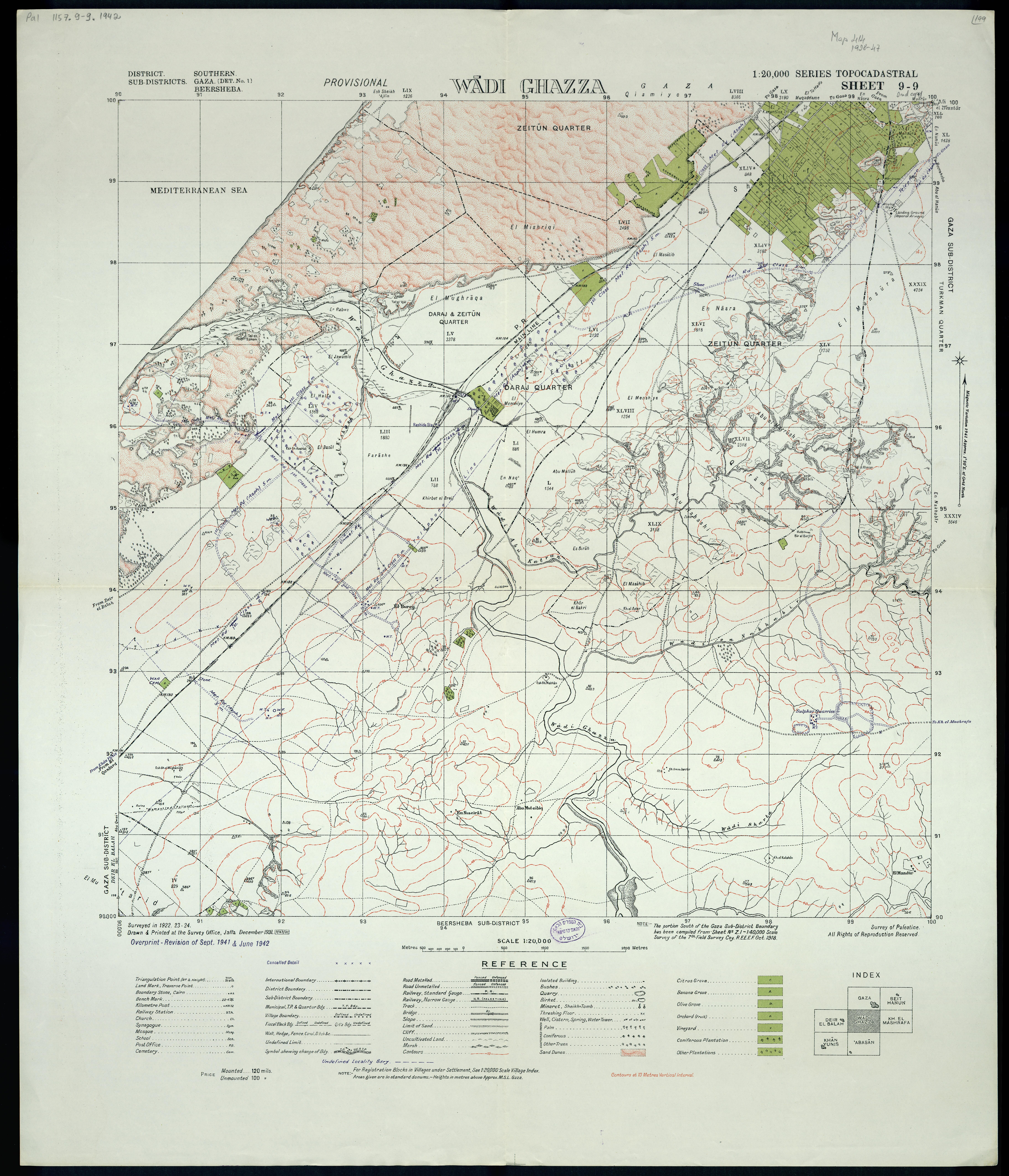
1942

== Wadi Gaza Nature Reserve ==
The Wadi Gaza Nature Reserve was declared a nature reserve by the Environmental Quality Authority of the Palestinian Authority in June 2000. It is confined to the course of the Wadi and its floodplain and banks within the Palestinian jurisdiction.

The Gaza section of the Coastal Aquifer is the only significant source of water in the Gaza Strip. Wadi Gaza runs through a wetland, the Gaza Valley, and as of 2012 it is used as a wastewater dump.

In 2022, rehabilitation began to turn Wadi Gaza back into a nature reserve.

== Geography ==
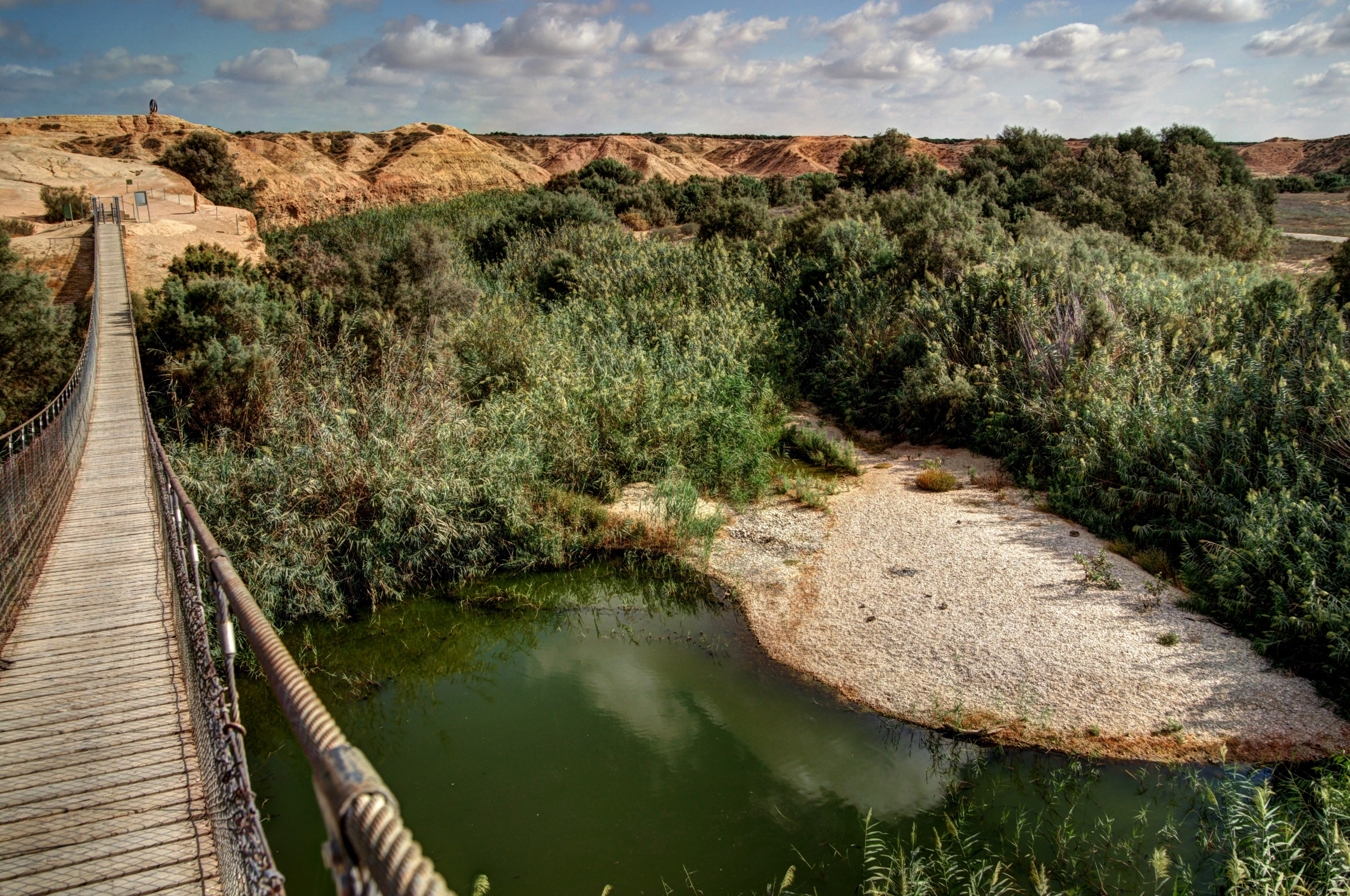
A bridge across HaBesor Stream, Western Negev.

The stream begins at Mount Boker (near Sde Boker), and spills into the Mediterranean Sea near Al-Zahra in the Gaza Strip. Further upstream it was marked as Wadi esh-Shallaleh on the 1878 Survey of Western Palestine map. The area has several important archaeological sites.

The stream is the largest in the northern Negev, and together with its largest tributaries, the Nahal Gerar, and the Beersheba stream, reaches as far east into the desert as Sde Boker, Yeruham, Dimona, and Arad/Tel Arad.

The source of Besor River lies at Mount Boker, near Sde Boker and the educational center Midreshet Ben-Gurion. From there it flows northwest towards the town of Ashalim, where it meets Nahal Be'er Hayil.

From there it flows north towards the ancient town of Haluza (Al-Khalasa). Then it continues northwest until it meets the Beersheba River a little to the east of the town of Tze'elim.

Near the village of Re'im, Nahal Besor meets the Nahal Gerar river, which is its biggest tributary.

One of the tributaries of the Besor River reaches Kibbutz Urim. Tributaries from south to north: HaRo'e Stream, Boker Stream, Mesora Stream, Zalzal Stream, Revivim Stream, Atadim Stream, Beersheba Stream, Assaf Stream, Amar Stream, Sahaf Stream, and Wadi Abu Katrun.

Finally, Bezor Stream flows across the Israeli border with the Gaza Strip, and into the Mediterranean sea.

== Ecology and environment ==
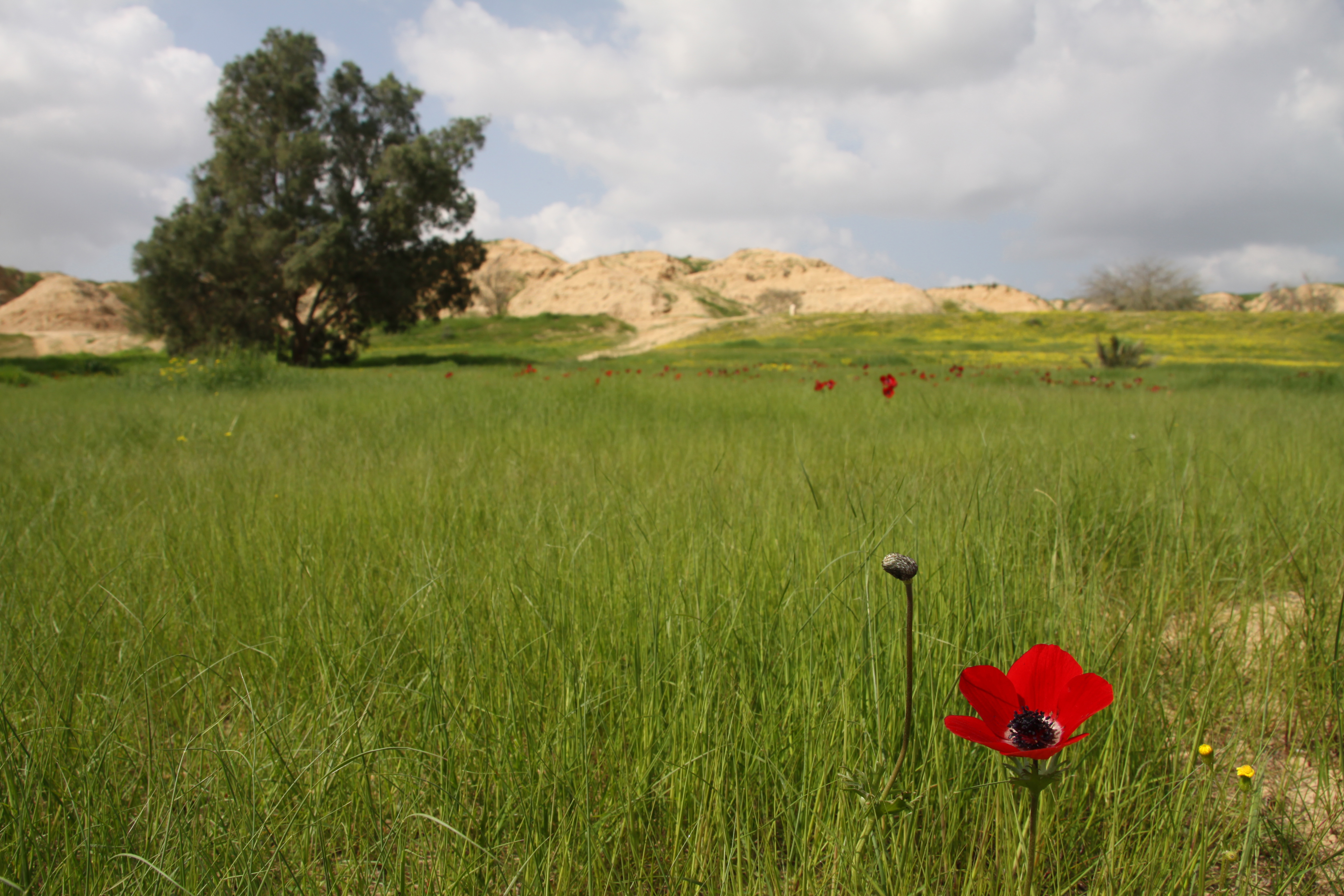
Red Anemone coronaria flower near the Besor. Typical for the region, Loess badlands can be seen in the background.

=== Fauna ===
The Gaza–Israel barrier presents a physical barrier which effects the makeup of wildlife in the portion of the wadi in the Gaza Strip by limiting movement. Between 2002 and 2004 a survey of wildlife around the wadi as it passes through the Gaza Strip found that it was devoid of large mammals, though small mammals such as bats, hedgehogs, and rodents were common. Wildlife hunting for food is more common in this area than in Israel.

=== Pollution ===
A study conducted in 2001 and 2002 found that the section of the wadi flowing through the Gaza Strip had higher levels of pollutants in summer than winter, when greater rainfall diluted the concentration. There were high levels of mercury, cadmium, iron and zinc.

=== Archaeology ===
Several archaeological sites were excavated by Eann Macdonald in 1929 to 1930 along the Wadi Ghazzeh in lower Nahal Besor that show signs of specialist flint production. Some of these sites were re-excavated in 1969 by Jean Perrot.

Several important Bronze Age archaeological sites are in this area. Among them are Tel Gamma, and Tell el-Far'ah (South). A smaller site of Qubur al-Walaydah is located between them.

=== Taur Ikhbeineh ===
Taur Ikhbeineh is an Early Bronze Age settlement 3 kilometres (1.9 mi) inland from Gaza's Mediterranean coast. It was occupied in the 4th millennium BC and pottery from the site indicates interactions between Canaanite and Egyptian people. It was located along a probable paleo-estuary of the wadi.

=== Tell es-Sakan ===
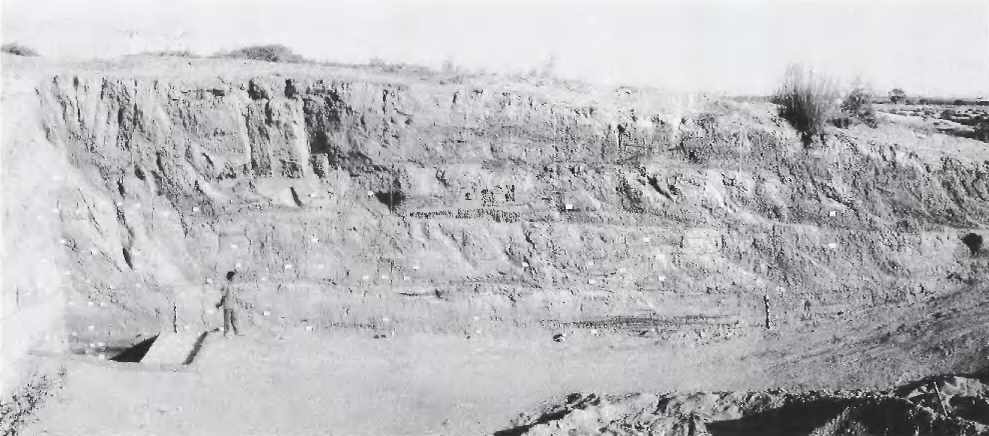
Pierre de Miroschedji and Moain Sadeq led excavations at Tell es-Sakan in 2000.

Tell es-Sakan is an Early Bronze Age settlement on the northern bank of the Wadi Gaza, close to Gaza City. It covers an area of 8–9 hectares (20–22 acres) and was inhabited between 3300 and 2300 BC. It began as an Egyptian settlement before it was abandoned around 3000 BC and later inhabited by Canaanites in 2600 BC.

=== Tell el-Ajjul ===
Tell el-Ajjul was established in the Bronze Age and was likely a successor settlement to Tell es-Sakan. It is on the northern bank of the wadi.

=== Tell Jemmeh/Tel Gamma ===
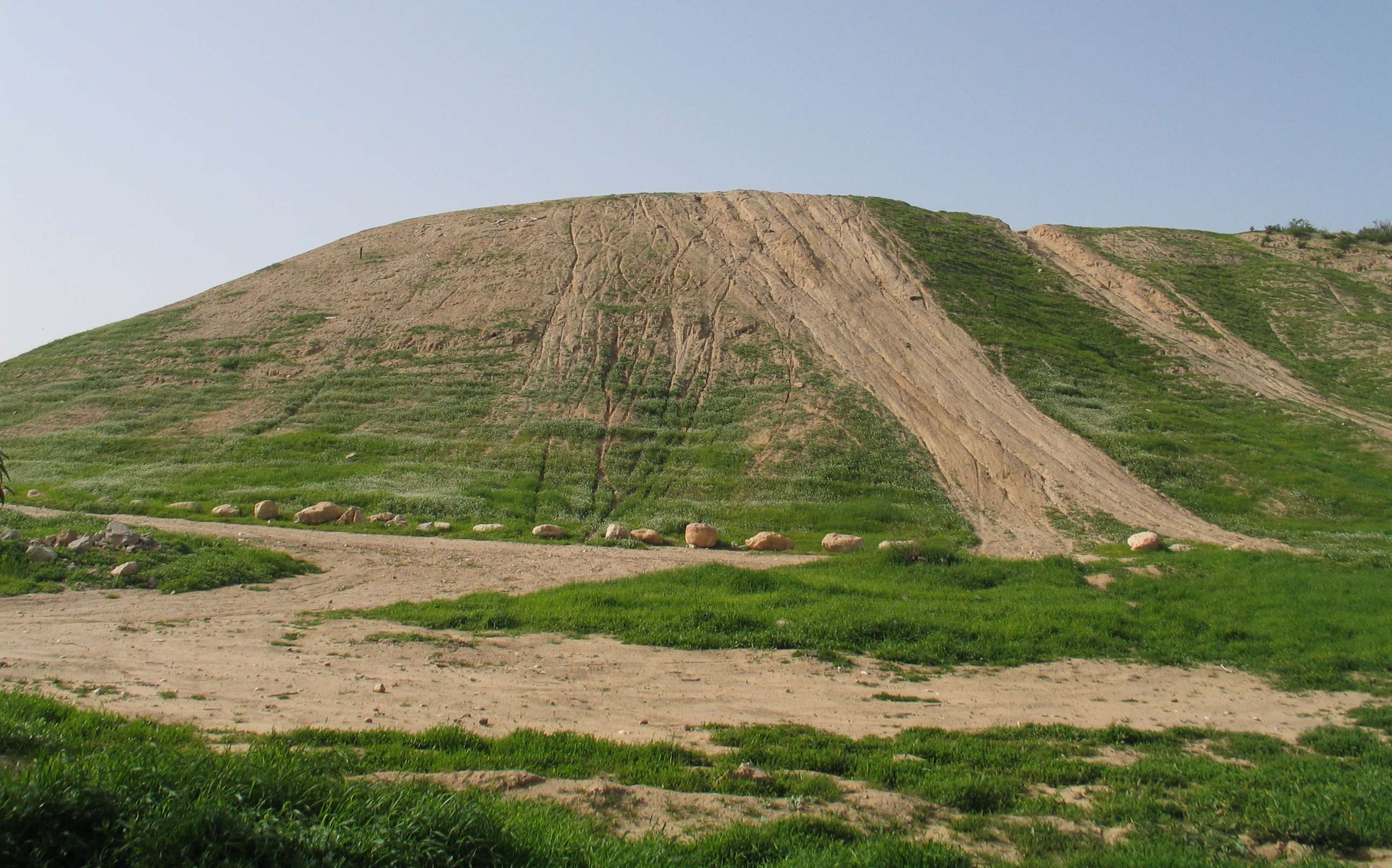
Tel Gamma

Tell Jemmeh (Arabic) or Tel Gamma (תל גמה; Hebrew) is located on the west side of Nahal Besor, near Re'im and is close to 50,000 square metres (5.0 ha; 12 acres) in size. The site was continuously settled only between the Middle Bronze IIB (c. 1700–1550 BCE) and the Persian period (c. 530–330 BC). During the Iron I (c. 1200–1000 BE) the site was part of the Philistine territory.

The first archaeological excavations mistakenly identified Tel Gamma as biblical Gerar, and it has since been identified by researchers as the Canaanite city of Yurzah (ירזה), that was cited on the lists of Pharaoh Thutmose III (15th century BCE), as well as in Amarna letters.

=== Tell el-Farah (South) ===
Tell el-Farah (South), sometimes referred to as Tell Fara, is on the west side of Nahal Besor, near Ein HaBesor. The tell is 37 hectares (91 acres) in size and 15 metres (49 ft) high and was an important fortified site in the Middle Bronze Age. The earliest major settlement that has been uncovered to date is from the Middle Bronze Age II, lasting from ca. 1650 to 1550 BCE. It was controlled by Egypt in the Late Bronze Age and inhabited by Philistines into the Iron Age. A hematite seal in the shape of the head of a bull was found and identified by Flinders Petrie to originate from Syria, it showed a bull attacking a lion beneath a scorpion.

Flinders Petrie first identified the site as Beth-Pelet (Joshua 15:27) and published the excavation reports under the names Beth-Pelet I - II. It has been linked by William Foxwell Albright to the ancient settlement of Sharuhen, although Tell el-Ajjul near the estuary of Nahal Besor, and Tel Haror to the north, are also being suggested. Nahal Besor has been suggested to be the Brook of Egypt.

== Flooding ==
Besor Stream is subject to annual flooding following heavy rains. Some Palestinians have claimed that Israel is at fault for the flooding, due to the opening of one or more dams opened upstream, and in 2015, AFP posted a video showing flooding, entitled "Gaza village floods after Israel opens dam gates." Several days later, AFP published a story acknowledging that "no such dam exists in Israel that could control the flow of water into Gaza, according to a team of AFP reporters on the ground as well as interviews with Israeli and international experts."

== See also ==
- Ein HaBesor
- List of archaeological sites in the Gaza Strip
- Nahal Hevron
- Tourism in Israel
