= Tel Haror =

Archaeological site

Coordinates: 31.382117°N 34.606522°E

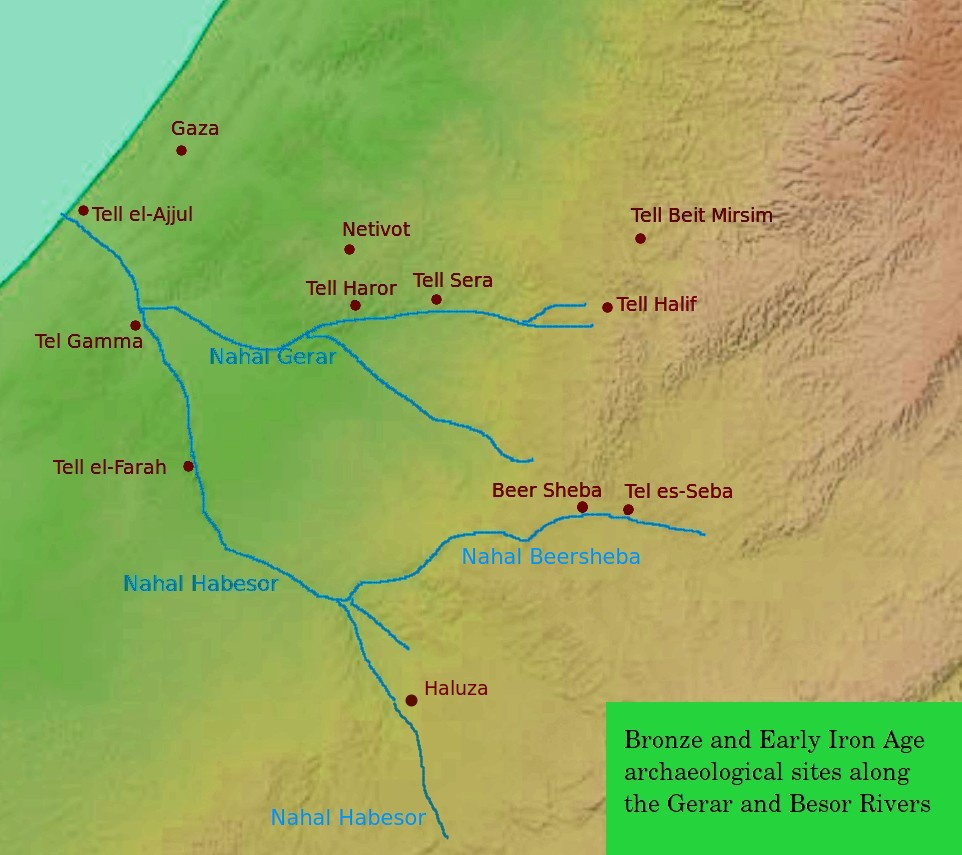
Position of Tel Haror on the shore of Nahal Gerar river

Tel Haror (also Tel Heror: Hebrew name) or Tell Abu Hureyra (Arabic name; also spelled Hureira and Hareira), is an archaeological site in the western Negev Desert, Israel, northwest of Beersheba, about 20 km east of the Mediterranean Sea, situated on the north bank of Wadi Gerar, a wadi known in Arabic as Wadi esh-Sheri'a. During the Middle Bronze Age II it was one of the largest urban centres in the area, occupying about 40 acres. The city contains substantial remains of Middle Bronze Age II through to Persian-period settlement strata.

== Excavations ==
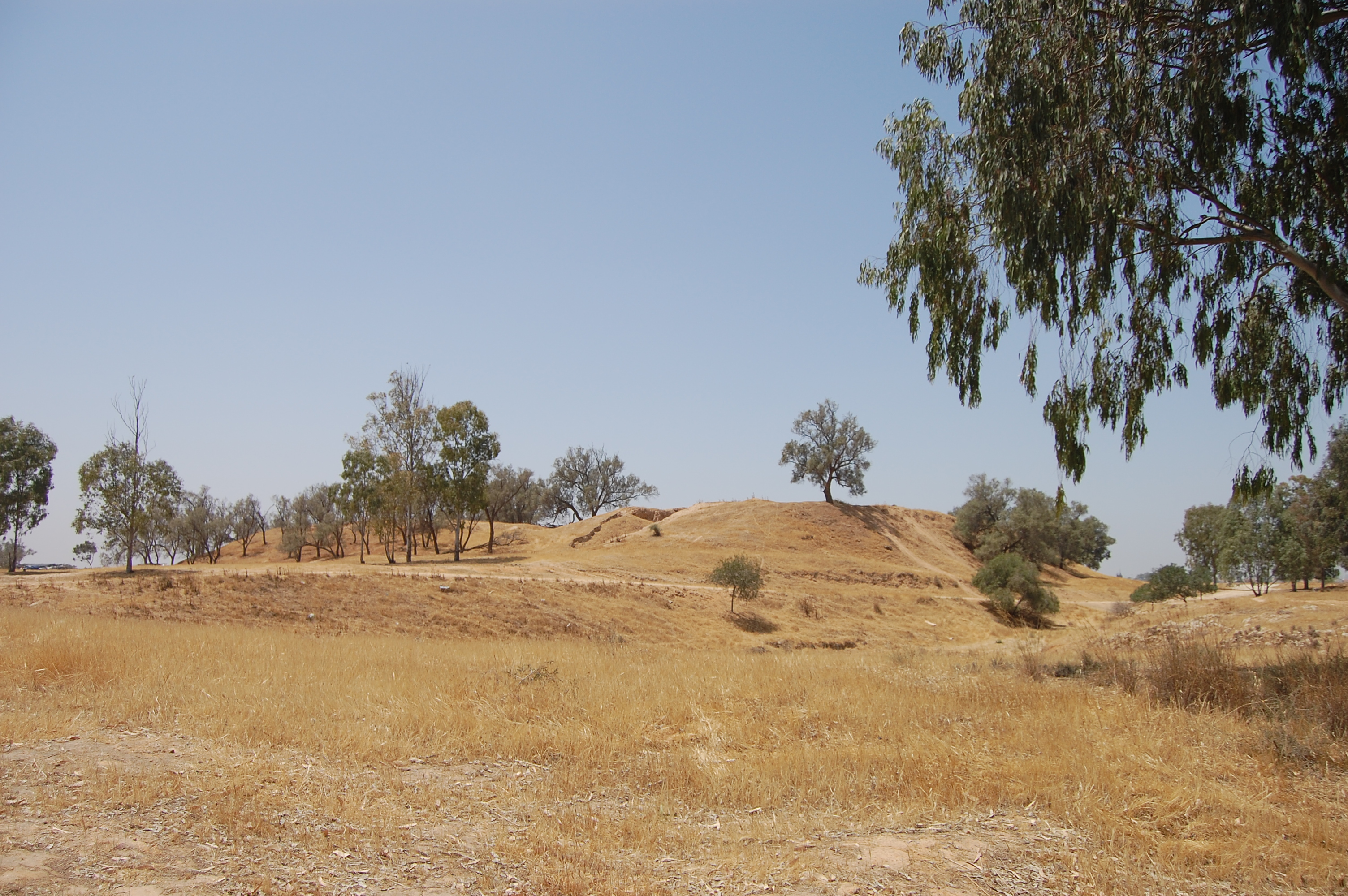
Tel Haror

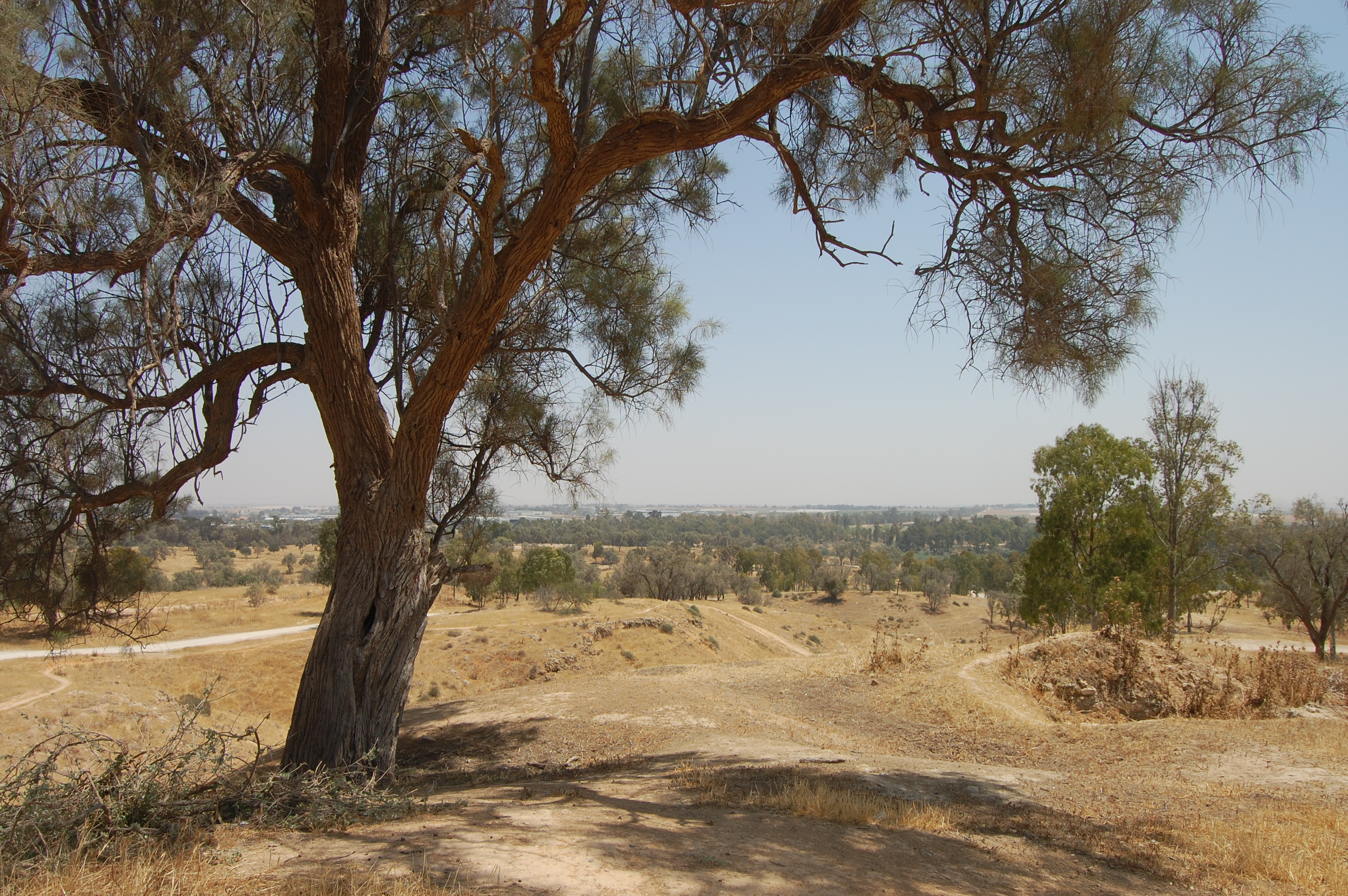
View from the top of Tel Haror

W.F. Albright suggested as early as 1924 that there was a Cushite colony here founded in the tenth century BCE.

In 1956 Yohanan Aharoni identified biblical Gerar with the site of Tell Abu Hureira (Tel Haror).

Tel Haror was excavated by Eliezer Oren of the Ben Gurion University of the Negev between 1982 and 1992. In 2010, there were also further explorations by Oren with P. Nahshoni and G. Bar-Oz.

Substantial remains of Middle Bronze to late Iron Age settlement strata were uncovered.

== History ==
=== Middle Bronze Age ===
==== Middle Bronze IIC/III (c. 1590-1530 BCE) ====
The extensive MBIII fortified city of Tel Haror was enclosed by an elaborate system of earthen ramparts fronted by a deep ditch.

==== Migdol temple ====
Within the city a sacred precinct was excavated, including a "classic Syrian form" migdol temple that contained numerous remains of animal sacrifice, as well as cultic pottery, some of it imported. Numerous ritual deposits (favissae) were found. The migdol temple had external dimensions of 9×15 m with massive walls that may have originally been as high as 10m. Within the fortifications, there is a well, more than 10m deep. It was later filled, including with some remains of ceremonial feasts.

==== Minoan writing ====
A Minoan graffito was found in the sacred precinct dating to ca. 1600 BCE. Analyses of the sherd determined that it originated in Crete, most likely the south coast. The three signs were inscribed prior to firing. The signs may either represent Linear A writing, or the Cretan hieroglyphs.

Only two Minoan inscriptions have been found in Israel so far. The other one was a short Linear A (or B) inscription that was found at Tel Lachish Level VI in 1987. It was published in 1996, and dates from around the 12th century B.C.E.

Excavations at Tel Haror have also uncovered significant amounts of Cypriot pottery at the site. This shows evidence of a cultural exchange with the Aegean during Middle Bronze (MB) and Late Bronze (LB) Age archaeological periods.

==== Unique donkey burial ====
An unprecedented find was the skeleton of a ritually interred juvenile donkey, about 4 years old, with a metal horse bit in association with its teeth and saddlebag fastenings on its back, in the site's Middle Bronze Age III (1700/1650-1550 BCE) sacred precinct. While donkey remains from this period are not unknown, the animal's young age, complete condition, and context all suggest it was a sacrificial offering.

Another, older, donkey was also found next to the younger donkey; also an additional mandible of a donkey was found nearby. Fragments of a storage jar, and of a bowl were found next to it.

Ritual interments of birds, and puppy dogs were also found; they were probably used for augury and divination. The bones are deposited along with many votive vessels, and clay figurines. The excavations testify to the continuous ritual activity at the site. It is only in its final phase that the interment of a sacrificed young donkey with a metal bit and saddlebag occurred.

According to Greenberg, the quantity of the finds at Haror is "unmatched at any other temple site in the Levant" for this time period (MBA, Middle Bronze Age). They tell us about the daily ritual activities at such temples, which is not found so often at other sites.

The enormous walls of the Migdal temple and other structures collapsed probably as a result of a massive earthquake around 1530 BCE. The city was abandoned afterwards.

=== Iron Age ===
==== Iron II ====
Tel Haror was inhabited again in the Iron Age. Archaeologist William G. Dever estimates its population at around 800 during the 9th and 8th centuries BCE. The ethnic makeup of this fortified site may have leaned more toward Judahite than Philistine. The town underwent destruction twice: once in the late 8th century, then again (for unclear reasons) around the mid-7th century.

== Theories ==
Archaeologist Anson Rainey proposed Tel Haror as the site of the fortress of Sharuhen, known from ancient Egyptian sources. This identification is also supported by Donald Redford, because of the site's immense size and important geographical position.

Tel Haror is generally accepted as the site of ancient Gerar. Nevertheless, some other places in the vicinity, between Gaza and Beersheba, have also been suggested, such as Tell Jemmeh (Tel Gamma on the map), Tell esh-Sharia and Tell et-Tuwail. Tuwail (also spelled Tell et-Tuwaiyil), is located by the Byzantine site of Be'er Osnat, near Kibbutz Tze'elim.

The ashlar masonry at Haror is integrated with mud-brick walls. This building technique is also found at Tel Sera (Tell esh-Sharia), which is located only about 7km east of Haror up the Gerar river (see the map); it is usually identified with the biblical Ziklag. So there was probably an early connection between these two sites.

This was one of the cities of the Philistines. Richly decorated Philistine pottery, both monochrome and bichrome, was found on the site.

== See also ==
- Ziklag
- Tell el-Ajjul

== Bibliography ==
- Day, Peter M., et al. 1999 Petrographic Analysis of the Tel Haror Inscribed Sherd: Seeking Provenance Within Crete. Aegaeum 20: 191–96.
- E.D. OREN, "The 'kingdom of Sharuhen' and the Hyksos kingdom," in E.D. OREN (ed.), The Hyksos: new historical and archaeological perspectives (1997) 253-283
- Oren, Eliezer D., et al. 1996 A Minoan Graffito from Tel Haror (Negev, Israel). Cretan Studies 5: 91–118.
- E.D. OREN, "Tel Haror," in E. STERN (ed.), The New Encyclopedia of archaeological excavations in the Holy Land (1993) 580-584
