= 1 Samuel 29 =

First Book of Samuel chapter

- ← chapter 28 chapter 30 →
- The pages containing the Books of Samuel (1 & 2 Samuel) in Leningrad Codex (1008 CE).
- Book: First book of Samuel
- Hebrew Bible part: Nevi'im
- Order in the Hebrew part: 3
- Category: Former Prophets
- Christian Bible part: Old Testament
- Order in the Christian part: 9

1 Samuel 29 is the twenty-ninth chapter of the First Book of Samuel in the Old Testament of the Christian Bible or the first part of the Books of Samuel in the Hebrew Bible. Jewish tradition attributes the book to the prophet Samuel, with later additions by the prophets Gad and Nathan; modern scholarship, however, regards it as a compilation of independent texts dated to c. 630–540 BCE. This chapter contains the account of David's escape from Saul's repeated attempts to kill him. This is within a section comprising 1 Samuel 16 to 2 Samuel 5 which records the rise of David as the king of Israel.

== Text ==
This chapter was originally written in the Biblical Hebrew. It is divided into 11 verses.

=== Textual witnesses ===
Some early manuscripts containing the text of this chapter in Biblical Hebrew are of the Masoretic Textual tradition, which includes the Codex Cairensis (895), Aleppo Codex (10th century), and Codex Leningradensis (1008). Fragments containing parts of this chapter in Hebrew were found among the Dead Sea Scrolls including 4Q51 (4QSam^{a}; 100–50 BCE) with extant verse 1.

Extant ancient manuscripts of a translation into Koine Greek known as the Septuagint (originally made in the last few centuries BCE) include Codex Vaticanus (B; $\mathfrak{G}$^{B}; 4th century) and Codex Alexandrinus (A; $\mathfrak{G}$^{A}; 5th century). (Note: The whole book of 1 Samuel is missing from the extant Codex Sinaiticus.)

== Places ==
Places mentioned in this chapter
- Aphek
- Jezreel
- Ziklag

== The Philistines reject David (29:1–5) ==
The Philistines mustered their forces at Aphek (Biblical Hebrew: אֲפֵק, romanized: ʾăp̄ēq), ready to face Saul in the Jezreel (יִזְרְעֶאל, yizrĕʿēl), when their commanders noticed the presence of "Hebrews" (עִבְרִים, ʿiḇrîm) in their ranks—easily distinguished by their clothing. Probably remembering how the Hebrews had defected at Michmas (מִכְמָשׁ, mikmāš; 1 Samuel 13–14), the Philistines were adamant not to allow David and his people to join their army, evenmore as they still recalled the victory song which ascribed to David for the death of "tens of thousands" of Philistines.

=== Verse 1 ===
Now the Philistines gathered together all their armies to Aphek: and the Israelites pitched by a fountain which is in Jezreel.

- "Aphek": a common place name using a Hebrew word meaning "fortress". There is one in Judah (1 Samuel 4:1)—here identified with what is now the village of Fuku'a (פֻקוּעַ, fuqûaʿ)—near Mount Gilboa, and within the territory of the tribe of Issachar.
- "A fountain which is in Jezreel": identified with what is now known as Ma'ayan Harod (מַעְיָן חֲרוֹד, maʿyān ḥărôd, 'Spring of Harod') in Modern Hebrew and Ain Jalût (عين جالود, ʿayn jālūd, 'Spring of Goliath'). It is large spring which flows from under the cavern in the rock at the base of Gilboa.

== Achish sends David back to Ziklag (29:6–11) ==
Pressured by other Philistine leaders, Achish was compelled to send David back to Ziklag. However, he had never personally doubted David's loyalty; he even found David faultless, honest, blameless, "as an angel of God" (verses 3, 6–7, 9–10). David declared his innocence to Achish and obeyed the command to return home, thereby sparing himself from participating in the deaths of Saul and Jonathan.

=== Verse 10 ===
"Now, therefore, rise early in the morning with your master's servants who have come with you. And as soon as you are up early in the morning and have light, depart."

- After "come with you", the Septuagint has "and go to the place which I have selected for you there; and set no bothersome word in your heart, for you are good before me. And rise on your way", which is not present in the Masoretic Text, Targum Jonathan, or Christian Latin Vulgate versions.
- "Your master's servants who have come with you": according to Christian theologian Albert Barnes, this may refer to the considerable number of Manassites who, as reported in 1 Chronicles 12:19–21, elected to follow David and went back with him to Ziklag.

== See also ==
- Achish
- Israelites
- Philistines
- Saul
- United Monarchy
- Related Bible parts: 1 Samuel 27, 1 Samuel 28, 1 Samuel 30

== Sources ==
=== Commentaries on Samuel ===
- Auld, Graeme (2003). "1 & 2 Samuel". In James D. G. Dunn and John William Rogerson (ed.). Eerdmans Commentary on the Bible. Eerdmans. ISBN 9780802837110.
- Bergen, David T. (1996). 1, 2 Samuel. B&H Publishing Group. ISBN 9780805401073.
- Chapman, Stephen B. (2016). 1 Samuel as Christian Scripture: A Theological Commentary. Wm. B. Eerdmans Publishing Company. ISBN 978-1467445160.
- Evans, Paul (2018). Longman, Tremper (ed.). 1-2 Samuel. The Story of God Bible Commentary. Zondervan Academic. ISBN 978-0310490944.
- Gordon, Robert (1986). I & II Samuel, A Commentary. Paternoster Press. ISBN 9780310230229.
- Hertzberg, Hans Wilhelm (1964). I & II Samuel, A Commentary (trans. from German 2nd edition 1960 ed.). Westminster John Knox Press. p. 19. ISBN 978-0664223182.
- Tsumura, David Toshio (2007). The First Book of Samuel. Eerdmans. ISBN 9780802823595.

=== General ===
- Breytenbach, Andries (2000). "Who Is Behind The Samuel Narrative?". In Johannes Cornelis de Moor and H.F. Van Rooy (ed.). Past, Present, Future: the Deuteronomistic History and the Prophets. Brill. ISBN 9789004118713.
- Coogan, Michael David (2007). Coogan, Michael David; Brettler, Marc Zvi; Newsom, Carol Ann; Perkins, Pheme (eds.). The New Oxford Annotated Bible with the Apocryphal/Deuterocanonical Books: New Revised Standard Version, Issue 48 (Augmented 3rd ed.). Oxford University Press. ISBN 978-0195288810.
- Fitzmyer, Joseph A. (2008). A Guide to the Dead Sea Scrolls and Related Literature. Grand Rapids, MI: William B. Eerdmans Publishing Company. ISBN 9780802862419.
- Halley, Henry H. (1965). Halley's Bible Handbook: an abbreviated Bible commentary (24th (revised) ed.). Zondervan Publishing House. ISBN 0-310-25720-4.
- Hayes, Christine (2015). Introduction to the Bible. Yale University Press. ISBN 978-0300188271.
- Jones, Gwilym H. (2007). "12. 1 and 2 Samuel". In Barton, John; Muddiman, John (eds.). The Oxford Bible Commentary (first (paperback) ed.). Oxford University Press. pp. 196–232. ISBN 978-0199277186.
- Klein, R.W. (2003). "Samuel, books of". In Bromiley, Geoffrey W (ed.). The International Standard Bible Encyclopedia. Eerdmans. ISBN 9780802837844.
- Knight, Douglas A (1995). "Chapter 4 Deuteronomy and the Deuteronomists". In James Luther Mays, David L. Petersen and Kent Harold Richards (ed.). Old Testament Interpretation. T&T Clark. ISBN 9780567292896.
- Ulrich, Eugene, ed. (2010). The Biblical Qumran Scrolls: Transcriptions and Textual Variants. Brill.
- Würthwein, Ernst (1995). The Text of the Old Testament. Translated by Rhodes, Erroll F. Grand Rapids, MI: Wm. B. Eerdmans. ISBN 0-8028-0788-7.
