= Philistine language =

Ancient languages spoken by the Philistines

Iron Age Philistine
- Native to: Philistia
- Ethnicity: Philistines
- Extinct: c. 7th century BC
- Language family: Afroasiatic: Semitic; West Semitic; Central Semitic; Northwest Semitic; Canaanite; North; Iron Age Philistine

Language codes
- ISO 639-3: None (mis)
- Glottolog: None

The Philistine language (/ˈfɪləstiːn, ˈfɪləstaɪn, fəˈlɪstən, fəˈlɪstiːn/) is the extinct language of the Philistines. Very little is known about the language, of which a handful of words survived as cultural loanwords in Biblical Hebrew describing specifically Philistine institutions, like the serānim, the "lords" of the Philistine five cities ("pentapolis"), the ʿargāz receptacle, mentioned in 1 Samuel 6, and the title paḏi.

== Classification ==
To judge from inscriptions alone, it could appear that the Philistine language is simply part of the local Canaanite dialect continuum, which includes Hebrew, Edomite, Moabite, and Phoenician. For instance, the Ekron inscription, identifying the archaeological site securely as the Biblical Ekron, is the first connected body of text to be identified as Philistine, on the basis of its location. However, it is written in a Canaanite dialect similar to Phoenician and Hebrew.

There is not enough information about the original language of the Philistines to relate it confidently to any other languages. Possible relations to Indo-European languages, even Mycenaean Greek, support the theory that immigrant Philistines originated among "sea peoples". There are hints of non-Semitic vocabulary and onomastics, but the inscriptions are enigmatic: a number of inscribed miniature "anchor seals" have been found at various Philistine sites. On the other hand, evidence from the slender corpus of brief inscriptions from Iron Age IIA–IIB Tell es-Safi (Tell es-Safi inscription) demonstrates that at some stage during the local Iron Age, the Philistines started using one of the dialects of the local Canaanite language and script, which in time masked and replaced the earlier, non-local linguistic traditions, which doubtless became reduced to a linguistic substratum, for it ceased to be recorded in inscriptions. Towards the end of the Philistine settlement in the area, in the 8th and the 7th centuries BC before their destruction by Assyria, the primary written language in Philistia was a Canaanite dialect that was written in a version of the West Semitic alphabet so distinctive that Frank Moore Cross termed it the "Neo-Philistine script". The Assyrian and Babylonian conquests destroyed the Philistine presence on the coast. When documentation resumes, under the Achaemenid Empire (Persian Empire), it is in Imperial Aramaic, the lingua franca of the Neo-Assyrian, Neo-Babylonian, and Achaemenid empires.

=== Philistine as an Indo-European language ===
Pre-Iron Age Philistine
- Native to: Philistia
- Ethnicity: Philistines
- Extinct: c. 9th century BC
- Language family: unclassified, probably Indo-European: Pre-Iron Age Philistine

Language codes
- ISO 639-3: None (mis)
- Glottolog: None

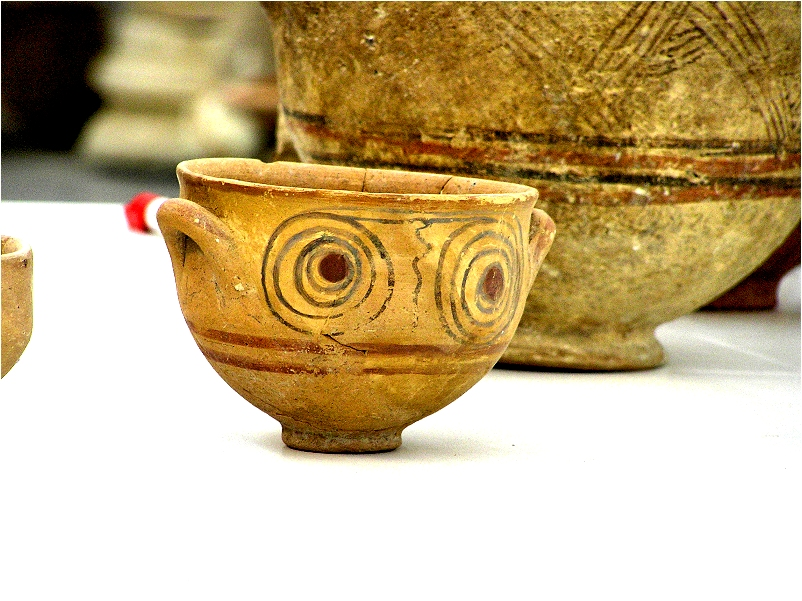
Philistine bichrome pottery

There is some evidence in favour of the suggestion that the Philistines originally spoke an Indo-European language, which would help explain the markedly Aegean origin of Philistine pottery styles and decorative motifs, particularly Philistine Bichrome ware, which differ markedly from the local Semitic artistic styles. A number of Philistine-related words found in the Hebrew Bible are not from Semitic languages, and can in some cases, with reservations, be traced back to Proto-Indo-European roots. R.D. Barnett related the Philistine word for captain, seren, to the Greek word tyrannos (which may be related to the Neo-Hittite sarawanas/tarawanas) and Edward Sapir made a case for relating Biblical Hebrew: כּוֹבַע, romanized: kobaʿ, lit. 'helmet' (used of Goliath's copper helmet in 1 Samuel 17:5) to Hittite kupahis. Both these words have been adopted into Hebrew. Sapir also described the Philistine title padî as "common IE property" to be compared with Greek πόσις, Lithuanian –pati-s, –pats, and Tocharian A pats. Some Philistine names, such as Goliath, Achish, and Phicol, appear to be non-Semitic in origin, and Indo-European etymologies have been suggested. In 2005, an inscription dating to the 10th century BC with two names, very similar to one of the suggested etymologies of the popular Philistine name Goliath (compare Lydian Alyattes, Greek Kalliades, Carian Wljat) was found in the excavations at Tell es-Safi/Gath. Israeli archaeologist Meir Ben-Dov suggested that the Hebrew word נָפָה, which occurs only in connection with the Philistine city of Dor, is related to Homeric Greek νάπη 'a forested plain'.
