= 1 Samuel 27 =

First Book of Samuel chapter

- ← chapter 26 chapter 28 →
- The pages containing the Books of Samuel (1 & 2 Samuel) in Leningrad Codex (1008 CE).
- Book: First book of Samuel
- Hebrew Bible part: Nevi'im
- Order in the Hebrew part: 3
- Category: Former Prophets
- Christian Bible part: Old Testament
- Order in the Christian part: 9

1 Samuel 27 is the twenty-seventh chapter of the First Book of Samuel in the Old Testament of the Christian Bible or the first part of the Books of Samuel in the Hebrew Bible. Jewish tradition attributes the book to the prophet Samuel, with later additions by the prophets Gad and Nathan; modern scholarship, however, regards it as a compilation of independent texts dated to c. 630–540 BCE. This chapter contains the account of David's escape from Saul's repeated attempts to kill him, lying within a section comprising 1 Samuel 16 to 2 Samuel 5 that records the rise of David as the king of Israel.

== Text ==
This chapter was originally written in Biblical Hebrew. It is divided into 12 verses.

=== Textual witnesses ===
Some early manuscripts containing the text of this chapter in Biblical Hebrew are of the Masoretic Textual tradition, which includes the Codex Cairensis (895), Aleppo Codex (10th century), and Codex Leningradensis (1008). Fragments containing parts of this chapter in Hebrew were found among the Dead Sea Scrolls including 4Q51 (4QSam^{a}; 100–50 BCE) with extant verses 1–2, 8–12.

Extant ancient manuscripts of a translation into Koine Greek known as the Septuagint (originally compiled in the last few centuries BCE) include Codex Vaticanus (B; $\mathfrak{G}$^{B}; 4th century) and Codex Alexandrinus (A; $\mathfrak{G}$^{A}; 5th century). (Note: The whole book of 1 Samuel is missing from the extant Codex Sinaiticus.)

== Places ==
Places mentioned in this chapter
- Gath
- Egypt
- Shur
- Ziklag

== David in Gath (27:1–4) ==
David decides to cross into the Philistines' territory to escape Saul (verses 1–4), staying as a vassal of the Philistine king Achish (pronounced [/ʔaˈχiːʃ/]; Biblical Hebrew: אָכִישׁ, romanized: ʾāḵîš) of Gath ([/ɡaθ/]; גַּת, gaṯ) for one year and four months (verse 7). The first time David was in Gath, he had to feign insanity to escape (1 Samuel 21:10–15), but this time, with 600 loyal soldiers and the report of his fallout with Saul, David was well received as a group of mercenaries for the Philistines—a common practice in the ancient Near East documented in various sources.

=== Verse 2 ===
And David arose, and he passed over with the six hundred men that were with him unto Achish, the son of Maoch, king of Gath.

- "Achish, the son of Maoch" ([/maˈʕoːχ/]; מָעוֹךְ, māʿôḵ): the additional identification of a father may imply this Achish to be different from the one David met in 1 Samuel 21. He is considered identical with Achish, son of Maachah ([/maʕaˈkāh/]; מַעֲכָה, maʿăḵāh), who is later mentioned in 1 Kings 2:39.

== David in Ziklag (27:5–12) ==
For a brief period, he and his contingent resided in the royal city of Gath with Achish. However, at his own request, he subsequently established himself in Ziklag (צִקְלַג, ṣiqlāg), which was presumably granted to him by Achish in exchange for military service. Thus, Ziklag became the property of the Judean kings. From Ziklag, David launched raids against Israel's enemies, including the Geshurites, the Girzites, and the Amalekites, while giving the impression to Achish that he was targeting enemies of the Philistines. By conquering these potential adversaries and collecting booty, David was effectively preparing for his future kingship.

=== Verse 6 ===
Then Achish gave him Ziklag that day. Therefore, Ziklag has belonged to the kings of Judah to this day.

- "Ziklag": allotted to the tribes of Simeon and Judah in Joshua 15:31 and 19:5, but the definitive location remains unknown. Some identify it with Tell el-Khuweilfeh (Arabic: تل الخويلفة, romanized: Tall al‑Khuwaylifah), (Note: Possibly רִמּוֹן (Rimmôn) or חָרְמָה (Ḥormāh).) north of Beersheba; others with Tell ash‑Sheri'ah (تل الشرِيعة, Tall ash‑Sharīʿah), (Note: Possibly Gerar (גְּרָר, Gerār).) southeast of Gaza City.

== See also ==
- Abigail
- Achish
- Ahinoam
- Amalek
- Carmelite
- Geshurite
- Gezrite
- Jerahmeelite
- Jezreelite
- Kenite
- Maoch
- Nabal
- Philistines
- Related Bible parts: 1 Samuel 21, 1 Samuel 25, 1 Samuel 26

== Sources ==
=== Commentaries on Samuel ===
- Auld, Graeme (2003). "1 & 2 Samuel". In James D. G. Dunn and John William Rogerson (ed.). Eerdmans Commentary on the Bible. Eerdmans. ISBN 978-0-8028-3711-0.
- Bergen, David T. (1996). 1, 2 Samuel. B&H Publishing Group. ISBN 978-0-8054-0107-3.
- Chapman, Stephen B. (2016). 1 Samuel as Christian Scripture: A Theological Commentary. Wm. B. Eerdmans Publishing Company. ISBN 978-1-4674-4516-0.
- Evans, Paul (2018). Longman, Tremper (ed.). 1-2 Samuel. The Story of God Bible Commentary. Zondervan Academic. ISBN 978-0-310-49094-4.
- Gordon, Robert (1986). I & II Samuel, A Commentary. Paternoster Press. ISBN 978-0-310-23022-9.
- Hertzberg, Hans Wilhelm (1964). I & II Samuel, A Commentary (trans. from German 2nd edition 1960 ed.). Westminster John Knox Press. p. 19. ISBN 978-0-664-22318-2.
- Tsumura, David Toshio (2007). The First Book of Samuel. Eerdmans. ISBN 978-0-8028-2359-5.

=== General ===
- Breytenbach, Andries (2000). "Who Is Behind The Samuel Narrative?". In Johannes Cornelis de Moor and H.F. Van Rooy (ed.). Past, Present, Future: the Deuteronomistic History and the Prophets. Brill. ISBN 9789004118713.
- Coogan, Michael David (2007). Coogan, Michael David; Brettler, Marc Zvi; Newsom, Carol Ann; Perkins, Pheme (eds.). The New Oxford Annotated Bible with the Apocryphal/Deuterocanonical Books: New Revised Standard Version, Issue 48 (Augmented 3rd ed.). Oxford University Press. ISBN 978-0-19-528881-0.
- Fitzmyer, Joseph A. (2008). A Guide to the Dead Sea Scrolls and Related Literature. Grand Rapids, MI: William B. Eerdmans Publishing Company. ISBN 978-0-8028-6241-9.
- Halley, Henry H. (1965). Halley's Bible Handbook: an abbreviated Bible commentary (24th (revised) ed.). Zondervan Publishing House. ISBN 0-310-25720-4.
- Hayes, Christine (2015). Introduction to the Bible. Yale University Press. ISBN 978-0-300-18827-1.
- Jones, Gwilym H. (2007). "12. 1 and 2 Samuel". In Barton, John; Muddiman, John (eds.). The Oxford Bible Commentary (first (paperback) ed.). Oxford University Press. pp. 196–232. ISBN 978-0-19-927718-6.
- Klein, R.W. (2003). "Samuel, books of". In Bromiley, Geoffrey W (ed.). The International Standard Bible Encyclopedia. Eerdmans. ISBN 978-0-8028-3784-4.
- Knight, Douglas A (1995). "Chapter 4 Deuteronomy and the Deuteronomists". In James Luther Mays, David L. Petersen and Kent Harold Richards (ed.). Old Testament Interpretation. T&T Clark. ISBN 978-0-567-29289-6.
- Ulrich, Eugene, ed. (2010). The Biblical Qumran Scrolls: Transcriptions and Textual Variants. Brill.
- Würthwein, Ernst (1995). The Text of the Old Testament. Translated by Rhodes, Erroll F. Grand Rapids, MI: Wm. B. Eerdmans. ISBN 0-8028-0788-7.
