= Ziklag =

Historic town in the Kingdom of Judah

Ziklag (Hebrew: צִקְלַג, romanized: Ṣiqlaḡ) is the biblical name of a town in the Negev region in the southwest of what was the Kingdom of Judah. It was a provincial town in the Philistine kingdom of Gath when Achish was king. Its exact location has not been identified with any certainty.

== Identification ==
At least 14 sites have been proposed as the location of Ziklag. At the end of the 19th century, both Haluza (by Wadi Asluj, south of Beersheba) and Khirbet Zuheiliqah (northwest of Beersheba and south-southeast of Gaza City) had been suggested as possible locations. Conder and Kitchener identified Khirbet Zuheiliqah as the location on the basis of Ziklag being a corruption of Zahaliku, whence also Zuheiliqah.

The more recently proposed identifications for Ziklag are:

- Albrecht Alt (1883–1956) proposed Tel Halif/Tell el-Khuweilifeh, just beside kibbutz Lahav, some 10 miles (16 km) northeast of Beersheba. Due to this identification, for some time Lahav was officially named Tzekleg.
- Tell esh-Sharia (Arabic) or Tel Sera (Hebrew). In June 2020, Moshe Garsiel and Bath-Sheva Garsiel suggested that since the name of the Tell as well as the Wadi both mean "law" in Arabic, it commemorates David's law of sharing the spoils of war between the warriors and those left behind, which occurred in the vicinity (1 Sam 30: 22–26).
- Tell el-Far'ah (South)
- Khirbet a-Ra'i in the Shephelah, close to modern-day Kiryat Gat, proposed in 2019 by excavating archaeologists Yosef Garfinkel and Saar Ganor and contested mainly on grounds of biblical geography and lacking name continuity by Aren Maeir and Israel Finkelstein. Kyle Keimer supported this identification in 2023.

== In the Bible ==
=== Philistines' original base ===
The Book of Genesis (in Genesis 10:14) refers to Casluhim as the origin of the Philistines. Biblical scholars regard this as an eponym rather than a person, and it is thought possible that the name is a corruption of Halusah; with the identification of Ziklag as Haluza, this suggests that Ziklag was the original base from which the Philistines captured the remainder of their territory. It has also been proposed that Ziklag subsequently became the capital of the Cherethites.

=== Tribal allotment ===
In the Book of Joshua's lists of cities of the Israelites by tribe, Ziklag appears both as a town belonging to the Tribe of Judah (Joshua 15:31) and as a town belonging to the Tribe of Simeon (Joshua 19:5). Textual scholars believe these lists were originally independent administrative documents, not necessarily dating from the same time, and hence reflecting changing tribal boundaries.

=== David receives Philistine Ziklag ===
1 Samuel 30 claims that by the time of David, the town was under the control of Philistines, but subsequently was given by their king – Achish – to David, who at that time was seemingly acting as a vassal of the Philistines. David requested "a place in one of the country towns" and was awarded Ziklag, which he used as a base for raids against the Geshurites, the Girzites, and the Amalekites, which he conducted away from Achish's oversight. David's reports to Achish say that he had been conducting raids on Saul's lands in southern Judah and on the Jerahmeelites.

Biblical scholars argue that the town was probably on the eastern fringe of the Philistines' territory, and that it was natural for it to be annexed to Judah when David became king. Since textual scholars regard the compilation of the Book of Joshua as late, probably due to the deuteronomist, it is possible that the tribal allocations in it date from after this annexation, rather than before.

=== David and the Amalekites ===
According to 1 Samuel 30, while David was encamped with the Philistine army for an attack on the Kingdom of Israel, Amalekites raided Ziklag, burning the town and capturing its population without killing them (scholars think this capture refers to enslavement). But none of the archaeological sites that have been proposed to be Ziklag show any evidence of destruction during the era of David.

In the narrative, when David's men discover that their families have been captured, they become angry with David. David seeks the face of his God to determine whether to pursue the Amalekites. The Lord answers and says to pursue them for he would recover all. Initially, 600 men go in pursuit, but a third of them are too exhausted to go further than the HaBesor Stream. They find an abandoned and starving slave, formerly belonging to one of the Amalekites who had raided Ziklag, and after giving him fig cake, raisin cake, and water, persuade him to lead them to the Amalekite raiders. The slave leads them to the captors' camp and finds them feasting and celebrating, due to the size of their spoil; David's forces engage in battle with them for a night and a day, and are victorious.

Textual scholars ascribe this narrative to the monarchial source of the Books of Samuel; the rival source, known as the republican source (named this due to its negative presentation of David, Saul, and other kings), does not at first glance appear to contain a similar narrative. The same narrative position is occupied in the republican source by the story of Nabal, who lived in the region south of Hebron (which includes the Negev). There are some similarities between the narratives, including David leading an army in revenge (for Nabal's unwillingness to give provisions to David), with 400 of the army going ahead and 200 staying behind, as well as David gaining Abigail as a wife (though in the Ziklag narrative he regains her), as well as several provisions, and a jovial feast in the enemy camp (i.e., Nabal's property). There are also several differences, such as the victory and provisions being obtained by Abigail's peaceful actions rather than a heroic victory by David, the 200 that stayed behind doing so to protect the baggage rather than due to exhaustion, the main secondary character being the wife of the enemy (Nabal) rather than their former slave, David's forces being joined by damsels rather than rejoining their wives, and Nabal rather than the Amalekites being the enemy.

The Books of Samuel go on to mention that as a result, the people the Amalekites took were released, and the spoil that the Amalekites had taken, including livestock, and spoil from attacks elsewhere, were divided among David's men, including the third that had remained at the Besor. This ruling, that even those left behind would get a share, is a response by David to those who believed only the two-thirds of David's men who had battled with the Amalekites should get a reward. A similar ruling is given in the Priestly Code (Numbers 31:27) and in Joshua 22:8. Scholars believe that these rulings derive from the decision in regard to the Amalekite spoil, rather than vice versa.

According to the text, once back at Ziklag, David sends portions of the spoil to the various community leaders within Judah; the text gives a list of the locations of the recipients, but they are all just within the Negev.

== See also ==
- Days of Ziklag, 1958 novel by Israeli author S. Yizhar

== Bibliography ==
- Blakely, Jeffrey A. (2007). "The Location of Medieval/Pre-Modern and Biblical Ziklag". Palestine Exploration Quarterly. 139 (1): 21–26. doi:10.1179/003103207x162988. ISSN 0031-0328.
- Harris, Horton (2011). "The Location of Ziklag: Its Identification by Felix Fabri". Palestine Exploration Quarterly. 143 (1): 19–30. doi:10.1179/003103210X12904439984124. ISSN 0031-0328.
- Harris, Horton (2011). "The Location of Ziklag: A Review of the Candidate Sites, Based on Biblical, Topographical and Archaeological Evidence". Palestine Exploration Quarterly. 143 (2): 119–133. doi:10.1179/003103211X12971861556954. ISSN 0031-0328.
