= 1 Samuel 28 =

First Book of Samuel chapter

- ← chapter 27 chapter 29 →
- The pages containing the Books of Samuel (1 & 2 Samuel) in Leningrad Codex (1008 CE).
- Book: First book of Samuel
- Hebrew Bible part: Nevi'im
- Order in the Hebrew part: 3
- Category: Former Prophets
- Christian Bible part: Old Testament
- Order in the Christian part: 9

1 Samuel 28 is the twenty-eighth chapter of the First Book of Samuel in the Old Testament of the Christian Bible or the first part of the Books of Samuel in the Hebrew Bible. Jewish tradition attributes the book to the prophet Samuel, with later additions by the prophets Gad and Nathan; modern scholarship, however, regards it as a compilation of independent texts dated to c. 630–540 BCE. This chapter contains the account of David's escape from Saul's repeated attempts to kill him, lying within a section comprising 1 Samuel 16 to 2 Samuel 5 that records the rise of David as the king of Israel.

== Text ==
This chapter was originally written in Biblical Hebrew. It is divided into 12 verses.

=== Textual witnesses ===
Some early manuscripts containing the text of this chapter in Biblical Hebrew are of the Masoretic Textual tradition, which includes the Codex Cairensis (895), Aleppo Codex (10th century), and Codex Leningradensis (1008). Fragments containing parts of this chapter in Hebrew were found among the Dead Sea Scrolls including 4Q51 (4QSam^{a}; 100–50 BCE) with extant verses 1–3, 22–25.

Extant ancient manuscripts of a translation into Koine Greek known as the Septuagint (originally was made in the last few centuries BCE) include Codex Vaticanus (B; $\mathfrak{G}$^{B}; 4th century) and Codex Alexandrinus (A; $\mathfrak{G}$^{A}; 5th century). (Note: The whole book of 1 Samuel is missing from the extant Codex Sinaiticus.)

== Places ==
Places mentioned in this chapter
- Endor
- Gilboa
- Shunem

== The Philistines gather against Israel (28:1–2) ==
Verses 1–2 continue the story of David's time among the Philistines, which will be resumed in chapters 29–30. As the Philistines prepared for another war against Israel, David was placed in an awkward position to prove his loyalty to Achish (pronounced [/ʔaˈχiːʃ/]; Biblical Hebrew: אָכִישׁ, romanized: ʾāḵîš) by going to fight against his own people.

== Saul and the Medium of Endor (28:3–25) ==
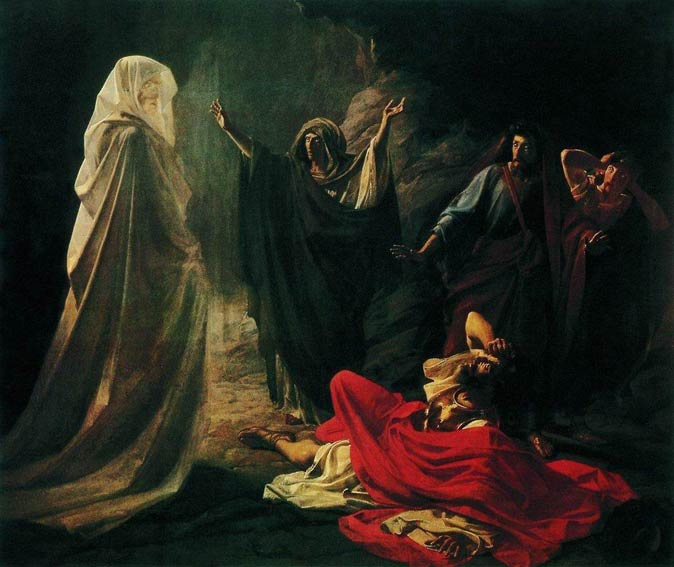
Witch of Endor by Nikolai Ge, 1857.

At his camp at Mount Gilboa, facing the big army of Philistines at Shunem, Saul was in utter fear because he had no access to divine guidance, as described in verses 3–6:

1. Samuel was already dead and buried, and Saul had forbidden communication with non-human entities from the land, as required by the Law of Moses: "Now Samuel had died and all Israel made lament for him; and he was buried in his own town of Ramah. And Saul had forbidden [recourse to] ghosts and familiar spirits in the land."
2. Saul did not receive counsel from YHWH in his dreams, via throwing sacred lots (Urim), or from his prophets (cf. Jeremiah 18:18; Ezekiel 7:26).

This caused Saul to desperately turn to prohibited means of getting to know the divine will, going against his own laws. Because Endor was located northeast of Shunem, thus behind enemy lines, Saul had to go in disguise and at night. The narrative about Saul's visit to the woman in Endor was 'one of the most bizarre texts in Scripture', as it claimed that Samuel's spirit could be called to speak through using witchcraft. It is debatable whether it was really Samuel's spirit or the woman impersonating Samuel, because there was no new information was given other than what was already known from Samuel's speech long ago. The text does say that the woman "saw a figure coming up", whom Saul assumed to be "Samuel" (verse 14), and was in terror (as perhaps she never had this result before), as well as got the knowledge that Saul was the one requesting this (verse 12). The main point of the narrative is to show how Saul was totally cut off from YHWH, and failed as a king to protect Israel as he himself and his heirs would die at the hands of the Philistines.

=== Verse 3 ===
Now Samuel had died, and all Israel had lamented for him and buried him in Ramah, in his own city. And Saul had put the mediums and the spiritists out of the land.

The first sentence is a repetition of 1 Samuel 25:1.

== See also ==
- Achish
- Amalek
- Israelites
- Necromancy
- Philistines
- Samuel
- Witch of Endor
- Related Bible parts: 1 Samuel 27, 1 Samuel 29, 1 Samuel 30

== Sources ==
=== Commentaries on Samuel ===
- Auld, Graeme (2003). "1 & 2 Samuel". In James D. G. Dunn and John William Rogerson (ed.). Eerdmans Commentary on the Bible. Eerdmans. ISBN 9780802837110.
- Bergen, David T. (1996). 1, 2 Samuel. B&H Publishing Group. ISBN 9780805401073.
- Chapman, Stephen B. (2016). 1 Samuel as Christian Scripture: A Theological Commentary. Wm. B. Eerdmans Publishing Company. ISBN 978-1467445160.
- Evans, Paul (2018). Longman, Tremper (ed.). 1-2 Samuel. The Story of God Bible Commentary. Zondervan Academic. ISBN 978-0310490944.
- Gordon, Robert (1986). I & II Samuel, A Commentary. Paternoster Press. ISBN 9780310230229.
- Hertzberg, Hans Wilhelm (1964). I & II Samuel, A Commentary (trans. from German 2nd edition 1960 ed.). Westminster John Knox Press. p. 19. ISBN 978-0664223182.
- Tsumura, David Toshio (2007). The First Book of Samuel. Eerdmans. ISBN 9780802823595.

=== General ===
- Breytenbach, Andries (2000). "Who Is Behind The Samuel Narrative?". In Johannes Cornelis de Moor and H.F. Van Rooy (ed.). Past, Present, Future: the Deuteronomistic History and the Prophets. Brill. ISBN 9789004118713.
- Coogan, Michael David (2007). Coogan, Michael David; Brettler, Marc Zvi; Newsom, Carol Ann; Perkins, Pheme (eds.). The New Oxford Annotated Bible with the Apocryphal/Deuterocanonical Books: New Revised Standard Version, Issue 48 (Augmented 3rd ed.). Oxford University Press. ISBN 978-0195288810.
- Fitzmyer, Joseph A. (2008). A Guide to the Dead Sea Scrolls and Related Literature. Grand Rapids, MI: William B. Eerdmans Publishing Company. ISBN 9780802862419.
- Halley, Henry H. (1965). Halley's Bible Handbook: an abbreviated Bible commentary (24th (revised) ed.). Zondervan Publishing House. ISBN 0-310-25720-4.
- Hayes, Christine (2015). Introduction to the Bible. Yale University Press. ISBN 978-0300188271.
- Jones, Gwilym H. (2007). "12. 1 and 2 Samuel". In Barton, John; Muddiman, John (eds.). The Oxford Bible Commentary (first (paperback) ed.). Oxford University Press. pp. 196–232. ISBN 978-0199277186.
- Klein, R.W. (2003). "Samuel, books of". In Bromiley, Geoffrey W (ed.). The International Standard Bible Encyclopedia. Eerdmans. ISBN 9780802837844.
- Knight, Douglas A (1995). "Chapter 4 Deuteronomy and the Deuteronomists". In James Luther Mays, David L. Petersen and Kent Harold Richards (ed.). Old Testament Interpretation. T&T Clark. ISBN 9780567292896.
- Ulrich, Eugene, ed. (2010). The Biblical Qumran Scrolls: Transcriptions and Textual Variants. Brill.
- Würthwein, Ernst (1995). The Text of the Old Testament. Translated by Rhodes, Erroll F. Grand Rapids, MI: Wm. B. Eerdmans. ISBN 0-8028-0788-7.
