= 1 Samuel 30 =

First Book of Samuel chapter

- ← chapter 29 chapter 31 →
- The pages containing the Books of Samuel (1 & 2 Samuel) in Leningrad Codex (1008 CE).
- Book: First book of Samuel
- Hebrew Bible part: Nevi'im
- Order in the Hebrew part: 3
- Category: Former Prophets
- Christian Bible part: Old Testament
- Order in the Christian part: 9

1 Samuel 30 is the thirtieth chapter of the First Book of Samuel in the Old Testament of the Christian Bible or the first part of the Books of Samuel in the Hebrew Bible. Jewish tradition attributes the book to the prophet Samuel, with later additions by the prophets Gad and Nathan; modern scholarship, however, regards it as a compilation of independent texts dated to c. 630–540 BCE. This chapter contains the account of David's escape from Saul's repeated attempts to kill him. This is within a section comprising 1 Samuel 16 to 2 Samuel 5 which records the rise of David as the king of Israel.

== Text ==
This chapter was originally written in Biblical Hebrew. It is divided into 31 verses.

=== Textual witnesses ===
Some early manuscripts containing the text of this chapter in Biblical Hebrew are of the Masoretic Textual tradition, which includes the Codex Cairensis (895), Aleppo Codex (10th century), and Codex Leningradensis (1008). Fragments containing parts of this chapter in Hebrew were found among the Dead Sea Scrolls including 4Q51 (4QSam^{a}; 100–50 BCE) with extant verses 22–31.

Extant ancient manuscripts of a translation into Koine Greek known as the Septuagint (originally was made in the last few centuries BCE) include Codex Vaticanus (B; $\mathfrak{G}$^{B}; 4th century) and Codex Alexandrinus (A; $\mathfrak{G}$^{A}; 5th century). (Note: The whole book of 1 Samuel is missing from the extant Codex Sinaiticus.)

== Places ==
Places mentioned in this chapter
- Aroer
- Besor
- Bethel
- Eshtemoa
- Hebron
- Hormah
- Jattir
- Jezreel
- Ramoth
- Ziklag

== The Amalekites raid Ziklag (30:1–6) ==
While Saul battled the Philistines, David returned to Ziklag only to find it burned by the Amalekites and its inhabitants carried away. The attack was probably in retaliation for David's raid on the Amalekites (1 Samuel 27:8–10). David and his men lost their wives and families, causing great lamentation (verse 4) and even placing David in personal danger (verse 6).

=== Verse 1 ===
Now when David and his men came to Ziklag on the third day, the Amalekites had made a raid against the Negeb and against Ziklag. They had overcome Ziklag and burned it with fire.

- "Negeb" (Biblical Hebrew: נֶגֶב, romanized: negev, lit. 'south'): referring to the southern part of Judah, and the adjacent country.

=== Verse 2 ===
And had taken captive the women and those who were there, from small to great; they did not kill anyone, but carried them away and went their way.

- "They did not kill anyone" (לֹא הֵמִיתוּ אִישׁ, lō hēmîtū ʾîš): Because all the warriors were away, the city could not offer any resistance, and since women and children were valuable for sale as slaves—mainly to neighboring Egypt—nobody was killed. However, leaving their wives and families completely defenseless probably made the men so angry at David that they were ready to kill him.

== David destroys the Amalekites (30:7–20) ==
One unique feature in the narrative is David's ability to consult YHWH directly. In contrast to Saul's illegal consultation of a necromancer at Endor (עֵין־דּוֹר, ʿēn-dōr, 'spring of Dor'), David "strengthened himself in the LORD", contacted YHWH through Abiathar the kohen (כֹּהֵן, kōhēn, 'priest'), and received a positive reply (verses 7–8). Thus, he was encouraged to pursue the attackers. A providential meeting with an exhausted Egyptian who had gone three days without food, and who, after being nourished with a fig-cake and raisins, provided David and his soldiers instant information to the raiders of Ziklag, even securing the service to guide them down to the Amalekite camp. In another coincidence David and his troops arrived just as the Amalekites were obliviously celebrating their victory with feasting, giving a good opportunity to revenge allowing only 400 camel riders to escape. The captured families were saved intact and their possession was reclaimed with more booty to collect. Moreover, David had avenged not only Ziklag but also other areas as mentioned in verse 14—the Negeb of the Cherethites in the southern area controlled by the Philistines, the Negeb of Caleb, which was around Hebron (חֶבְרוֹן, ḥebrôn), as well as Judean areas, providing special bond with the people of the areas as described later in 2 Samuel 2:1–4, when David becomes king of Judah.

=== Verse 19 ===
And nothing of theirs was lacking, either small or great, sons or daughters, spoil or anything which they had taken from them; David recovered all.

Through this victory David rescued all that the Amalekites had taken, his two wives, his men's wives, and all the children great and small, as well as all stuffs that were taken from Ziklag, so that nothing was missing.

== Dividing the spoils (30:21–31) ==
David's successful assault secured a substantial amount of loot, enabling him to distribute some as gifts to the people of Judah (verses 26–31). This action, along with his decision regarding the suggestion made by "churlish ones" (verses 22–25), demonstrates David's preparedness to assume the role of king. Consequently, Saul's leniency toward the Amalekites resulted in his downfall, while David's victorious campaign contributed to his ascent as a king who was obedient to God.

=== Verse 26 ===
When David reached Ziklag, he sent some of the spoil to the elders of Judah [and] to his friends, saying, "This is a present for you from our spoil of GOD's enemies" (Revised JPS Edition).

Writes Rabbi Adin Steinsaltz regarding David's "spoil" (שָׁלָל, šālāl) in his commentary on the texts of the Nevi'im (נְבִיאִים, neḇîʾîm, 'Prophets'):

David came back to Tziklag, [and] he apparently rebuilt the city. David now possessed much plunder, as in addition to that which had been divided among the soldiers, the Amalekites had invaded various Israelite and Philistine cities throughout the South, and he sent from the spoils to the elders of Judah, to all those who were his friends, saying: Here is a gift for you from the spoils of the enemies of the LORD.

== See also ==
- Abiathar
- Abigail
- Ahimelech
- Ahinoam
- Amalekites
- Belial
- Carmelites
- Cherethites
- Egypt
- Ephod
- Israelites
- Jezreelite
- Kenite
- Kohen
- Nabal
- Philistines
- Tribe of Judah
- Related Bible parts: 1 Samuel 27, 1 Samuel 28, 1 Samuel 29

== Sources ==
=== Commentaries on Samuel ===
- Auld, Graeme (2003). "1 & 2 Samuel". In James D. G. Dunn and John William Rogerson (ed.). Eerdmans Commentary on the Bible. Eerdmans. ISBN 9780802837110.
- Bergen, David T. (1996). 1, 2 Samuel. B&H Publishing Group. ISBN 9780805401073.
- Chapman, Stephen B. (2016). 1 Samuel as Christian Scripture: A Theological Commentary. Wm. B. Eerdmans Publishing Company. ISBN 978-1467445160.
- Evans, Paul (2018). Longman, Tremper (ed.). 1-2 Samuel. The Story of God Bible Commentary. Zondervan Academic. ISBN 978-0310490944.
- Gordon, Robert (1986). I & II Samuel, A Commentary. Paternoster Press. ISBN 9780310230229.
- Hertzberg, Hans Wilhelm (1964). I & II Samuel, A Commentary (trans. from German 2nd edition 1960 ed.). Westminster John Knox Press. p. 19. ISBN 978-0664223182.
- Tsumura, David Toshio (2007). The First Book of Samuel. Eerdmans. ISBN 9780802823595.

=== General ===
- Breytenbach, Andries (2000). "Who Is Behind The Samuel Narrative?". In Johannes Cornelis de Moor and H.F. Van Rooy (ed.). Past, Present, Future: the Deuteronomistic History and the Prophets. Brill. ISBN 9789004118713.
- Coogan, Michael David (2007). Coogan, Michael David; Brettler, Marc Zvi; Newsom, Carol Ann; Perkins, Pheme (eds.). The New Oxford Annotated Bible with the Apocryphal/Deuterocanonical Books: New Revised Standard Version, Issue 48 (Augmented 3rd ed.). Oxford University Press. ISBN 978-0195288810.
- Fitzmyer, Joseph A. (2008). A Guide to the Dead Sea Scrolls and Related Literature. Grand Rapids, MI: William B. Eerdmans Publishing Company. ISBN 9780802862419.
- Halley, Henry H. (1965). Halley's Bible Handbook: an abbreviated Bible commentary (24th (revised) ed.). Zondervan Publishing House. ISBN 0-310-25720-4.
- Hayes, Christine (2015). Introduction to the Bible. Yale University Press. ISBN 978-0300188271.
- Jones, Gwilym H. (2007). "12. 1 and 2 Samuel". In Barton, John; Muddiman, John (eds.). The Oxford Bible Commentary (first (paperback) ed.). Oxford University Press. pp. 196–232. ISBN 978-0199277186.
- Klein, R.W. (2003). "Samuel, books of". In Bromiley, Geoffrey W (ed.). The International Standard Bible Encyclopedia. Eerdmans. ISBN 9780802837844.
- Knight, Douglas A (1995). "Chapter 4 Deuteronomy and the Deuteronomists". In James Luther Mays, David L. Petersen and Kent Harold Richards (ed.). Old Testament Interpretation. T&T Clark. ISBN 9780567292896.
- Ulrich, Eugene, ed. (2010). The Biblical Qumran Scrolls: Transcriptions and Textual Variants. Brill.
- Würthwein, Ernst (1995). The Text of the Old Testament. Translated by Rhodes, Erroll F. Grand Rapids, MI: Wm. B. Eerdmans. ISBN 0-8028-0788-7.
