= Tell es-Safi inscription =

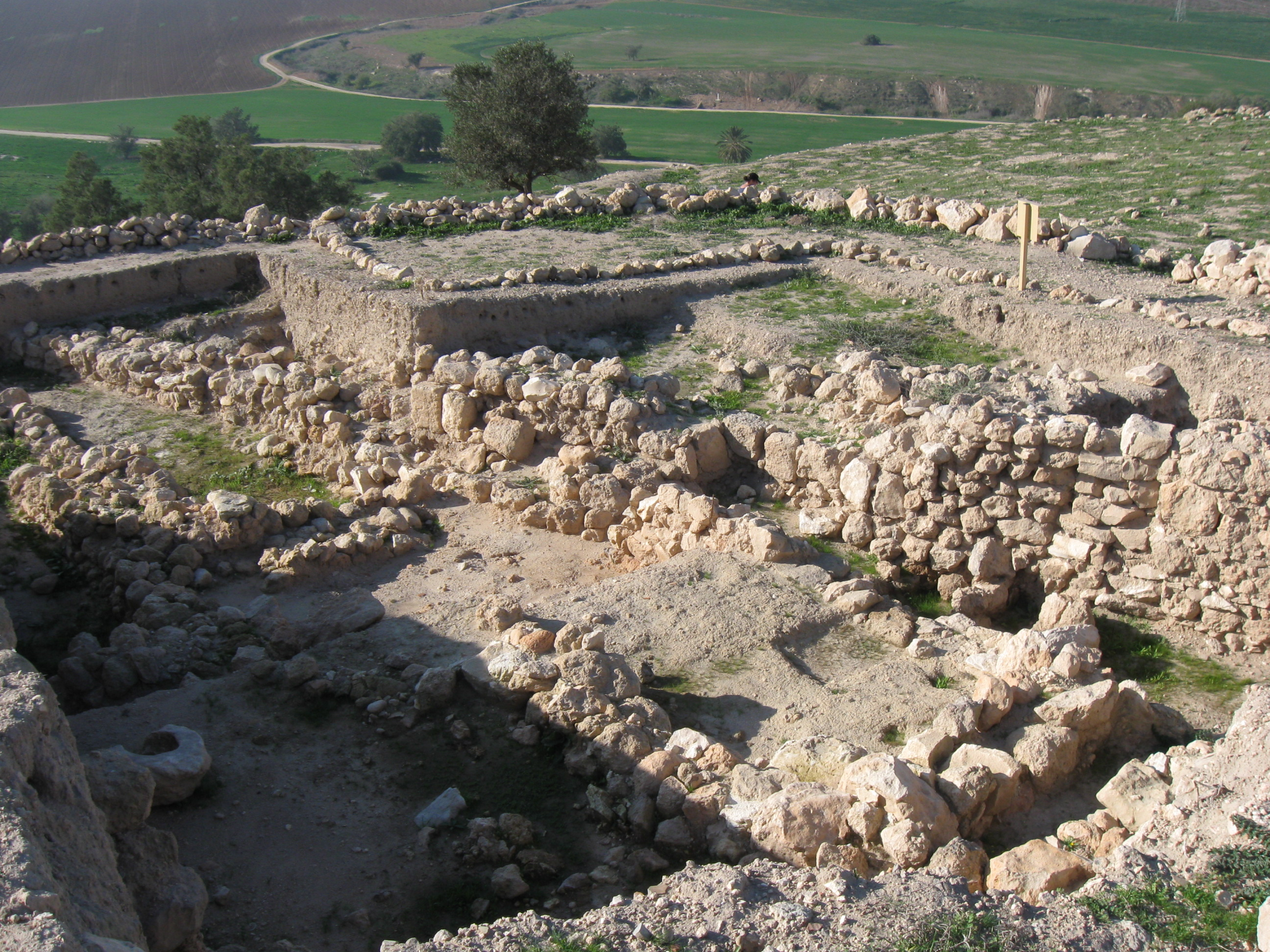
Excavations at Tell es-Safi

The Tell es-Safi inscription was found in 2005 at the archaeological site at Tell es-Safi, identified with the biblical city of Gath. It was under the destruction layer at the beginning of Iron Age IIA (1000–925 BCE).

Seven letters, interpreted as two words, are written on the piece of pottery: ‘LWT (אלות) and WLT (ולת). This was initially suggested to be similar to what would have been the name of Goliath (גלית, GLYT), the Biblical character from Gath.

Written in Proto-Canaanite, it is the “earliest known alphabetic inscription from an Iron Age Philistine site in a well defined context”.

== Bibliography ==
- The Tell es-Safi/Gath Archaeological Project
- Maeir, A.M., Wimmer, S.J., Zukerman, A. et Demsky, A. 2008, A Late Iron Age I/Early Iron Age II Old Canaanite Inscription from Tell es-Safi/Gath, Israel: Palaeography, Dating, and Historical-Cultural Significance, Bulletin of the American Schools of Oriental Research, 351, 39-71.
