= Moshe Garsiel =

Israeli professor and researcher

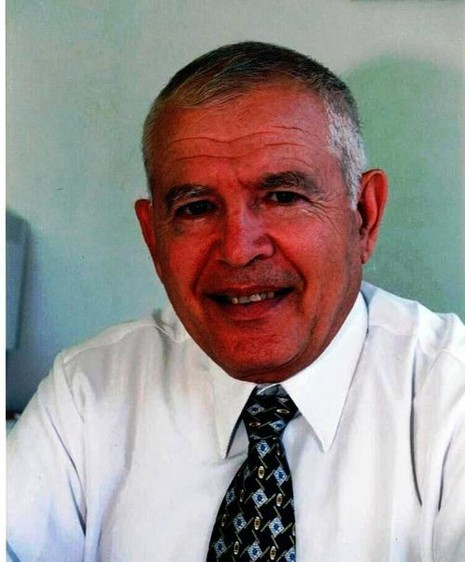
Moshe Garsiel

Moshe Garsiel (Hebrew: משה גרסיאל; born 1936) is professor emeritus of Bible at Bar-Ilan University.

== Early life and education ==
Moshe Garsiel was born and raised in Tel Aviv. Most of his academic studies were completed at Tel Aviv University: B.A. in Hebrew Bible and Hebrew Literature (1965), M.A. in Hebrew Bible (1968), Ph.D in Hebrew Bible (1974), Post-doctorate in Biblical Archaeology (1974-5).

== Career ==
Garsiel's major teaching and research positions have been at Bar-Ilan University: Instructor, The Department of Bible (1968-1973); lecturer, The Department of Bible (1974-1977); senior lecture (status-tenure) (1978-1980); associate professor (1984); full professor and a senate member (1992—2005). In 2006, he retired from Bar-Ilan as professor emeritus, but continues teaching voluntarily to this day and delivers seminars for graduate students (MA and Ph.D. students). He held different administrative positions at Bar-Ilan University: chairperson of The Department of The Land of Israel Studies, two terms as a chairperson of the Department of Bible, coordinator of The Teaching Committee of Bar-Ilan's Senate and Dean of the Faculty of Jewish Studies (1997-2001). Garsiel led the establishment and building of The Department of Land of Israel studies and Archaeology as well as The Department of the Middle Eastern Studies at Bar-Ilan University.

He participated in the archeological excavations in Tel Apheq-Antipatris (1975). Initiating, organizing, and guiding the students in three seasons of the Izbet-Sarta excavation (probably the site of biblical Eben-ha-ezer) (1975-1977), this excavation yielded an ancient Hebrew inscription, incised on a potsherd and dated to the end of the period of the biblical judges or to the beginning of the Kingdom of Israel (the united monarchy).

Garsiel served as a visiting professor of Bible and Biblical Archaeology at the Hebrew Theological College, Skokie, IL, USA (1977-1978, 1981); a visiting professor of Bible and Biblical Archaeology at the University of Wisconsin-Milwaukee, WI, USA (1985-1986); a visiting professor of the graduate summer school at the Hebrew Theological College, Skokie, IL, USA (1989 and 1991); and a visiting professor of Bible and Biblical Archaeology, the Jews' College affiliated to the University of London, UK (1992-1993).

He held a part-time position as a visiting professor at the Department of Bible, Tel Aviv University, Graduate School (1997); and a part-time position as a visiting professor at the Department of Jewish History, Haifa University Graduate School (2002-2003).

== Research ==
His academic fields of interest are: geographical and archaeological aspects of the bible, Ugaritic writings and the bible, history and historiography of the bible, biblical names and their literary meaning, and literary interpretation of the bible.

In June 2020, Prof. Moshe Garsiel and Dr. Bath-Sheva Garsiel published an article suggesting they have proof for the identification of the biblical city of Ziklag in Tel a-Sharia in the Negev. They argued that since the name of the Tell, as well as the Wadi below, means in Arabic 'law', it commemorates David's law of sharing the spoils of war between the warriors and the ones who are left behind, which occurred in the vicinity (1 Sam 30: 22-26).

== Personal life ==
Moshe Garsiel is married to Dr. Bat-Sheva Garsiel, a lecturer of Early Islam at the Department of Middle Eastern Studies of Bar-Ilan University, They reside in Petach-Tiqva and have three children.

== A Festschrift in his honour ==
- "Moshe Garsiel: the Teacher and the Researcher", in S, Vargon et al. (ed.), studies in Bible and Exegesis, 9, Presented to Moshe Garsiel, Bar-Ilan university, Ramat-Gan, 2009, pp. 15–18.

== Publications ==
Garsiel is a member of the board of editors of Beit Miqra, the advisory board member of Areshet—JSIJ (Jewish Studies an Internet Journal). He was a member of the board of editors of the Encyclopedia the World of the Bible, and a member of Biqoreth U-Parshanuth (Criticism and Interpretation) board of editors.

Garsiel published five research books, was co-editor and co-author of six books of the Encyclopedia the World of the Bible, He wrote a 12-unit course in 4 volumes for The Open University of Israel and published dozens of articles in academic journals and festschrifts.

=== Books ===
- The Kingdom of David: Studies in History and Inquiries in Historiography, Tel-Aviv 1975 (Hebrew).
- The Rise of the Monarchy in Israel: Studies in the Book of Samuel—A second edition of a written course for The Open University of Israel, 4 vols., Raananah, Israel 2008 (Hebrew).
- The First Book of Samuel: A Literary Study of Comparative Structures, Analogies and Parallels, Ramat Gan 1983 (Hebrew); 1985 (English translation); 1990 (A second printing by Rubin Mass, Jerusalem.)
- S. Abramski & M. Garsiel, The Book of 1 Samuel: Encyclopedia the World of the Bible, Ramat Gan 1985 (Hebrew).
- Midrashic Name Derivations in the Bible, Ramat Gan 1987 (Hebrew).
- S. Abramski & M. Garsiel, The Book of 2 Samuel: Encyclopedia the World of the Bible, Ramat Gan 1989 (Hebrew).
- Biblical Names: A Literary Study of Midrashic Derivations and Puns, Ramat Gan: Bar-Ilan University Press, 1991, 296 p.
- B. Oded & M. Garsiel, The First Book of Kings: Encyclopedia of the World of the Bible, Tel Aviv 1994 (Hebrew).
- G. Galil, M. Garsiel & M. Kochman, The First Book of Chronicles, The World of the Bible, Tel Aviv 1995 (Hebrew).
- M. Garsiel, et al., Psalms, vol. 2, The World of the Bible, Tel Aviv 1995 (Hebrew).
- M. Garsiel et al. (eds.), Studies in Bible and Exegesis, vol. III, Moshe Goshen-Gottstein—in Memoriam, Ramat Gan, Bar-Ilan University Press 1993.
- M. Garsiel et al. (eds.), Studies in Bible and Exegesis, vol. V, Presented to Uriel Simon, Ramat Gan, Bar-Ilan University Press 2000.
- M. Garsiel et al. (eds.), Studies in Bible and Exegesis, vol. X, Presented to Shmuel Vargon, Ramat Gan, Bar-Ilan University Press, 2011.
- M. Gruber, M.Garsiel, A. Brenner, B. Levine, M. Mor (eds.), Teshurah Le-Zafrirah: Studies in the Bible, the History of Israel and the Ancient Near East, Presented to Zafrirah Ben Barak, Ben-Gurion University in the Negev Press, Beer-sheba 2012.
- M. Garsiel, From Earth to Heaven: A Literary Study of Elijah Stories in the Book of Kings, Bethesda, Maryland, CDL Press 2014.

=== Selected articles ===
- The Heroes of King David, in Braslavi Jub. Vol., The Society for Bible Research, Jerusalem: 1970, pp. 149–159 (Hebrew).
- The Story of Ehud Son of Gerah, Hagut Ba-Mikra, 2, Tel-Aviv: 1976, pp. 57–77 (Hebrew).
- The Story of David and Bath-sheba in the Book of Samuel--Its Nature and Purpose, Beit-Mikra 49 (1972), pp. 162–182 (Hebrew).
- A Review of Recent Interpretations of the Story of David and Bath-sheba: II Samuel 11, Immanuel—Bulletin of Religion, Thought and Research in Israel, 2 (1973), pp. 19–20.
- M. Garsiel & I. Finkelstein, The Westward Expansion of the House of Joseph in the Light of the Izbet-Sarta Excavations, Tel-Aviv, 5 (1978), pp. 192–198.
- The Literary Structure, Art of the Storyteller and Development of Plot in the Book of Ruth, Hagut Ba-Mikra, 3, Tel-Aviv: 1979, pp. 66–83 (Hebrew).
- The Battle at Michmash (I Samuel 13-14)--A Historical-Literary Analysis, in U. Simon & M. Goshen (eds.), Studies in Bible and Exegesis—Arie Toeg in Memoriam, Ramat Gan 1980, pp. 15–50 (Hebrew).
- King Solomon's Trip to Gibeon and His Dream, in Ben-Yehudah Jub. Vol., The Society for Biblical Research, Tel-Aviv: 1981, pp. 181–218 (Hebrew).
- A New Commentary to the Book of Samuel--A Review, Immanuel, 16 (1983), pp. 25–31.
- Literary Study of Structure and Message in Jacob's Stories, Hagut Ba-Mikra, 4 (1983), pp. 63–81 (Hebrew).
- Models of Analogy and Sets of Comparison in the Bible, in MILET—The Open University Studies in Jewish History and Culture, II, Tel-Aviv: 1985, pp. 35–48 (Hebrew).
- Samuel's Speech Concerning The Custom of the King (1 Samuel 8), in Hagut Ba-Mikra, 5 (1988), pp. 112–136 (Hebrew).
- Metaphorical and Metonymical Methods of Description in the Biblical Story, Bikoret U-Parshanut (Criticism and Interpretation), 23 (1987), pp. 5–40 (Hebrew).
- Wit, Words and a Woman: 1 Samuel 25, in Y. T. Radday & A. Brenner (eds.), On Humor and the Comic in the Hebrew Bible, JSOT Monograph Series, Sheffield Academic Press: 1991, pp. 163–170.
- Midrashic Name Derivations in the Book of Samuel, in M. Bar-Asher et al. (eds.), Studies in Bible and Exegesis, 3, In Memorian of M. Goshen-Gotstein, Ramat Gan 1993, pp. 105–119 (Hebrew).
- Midrashic Name Derivations in the Elijah's Cycle, In B. Z. Luria (ed.), Gevaryahu Jub. Vol., Jerusalem: 1989, pp. 149–155 (Hebrew).
- Implicit Puns Upon Names as Subtle Colophons in the Bible, Gevaryahu Memorial Book, Jerusalem: 1990 (English Section), pp. 15–22.
- Puns Upon Names as a Literary Device in 1 Kings 1-2, Biblica 72 (1991), pp. 379–386.
- David's Battles Against the Philistines Near Jerusalem, Mechkerei Chag, 4, 1991, pp. 15–23 (Hebrew).
- The Story of David and Bath-sheba -- A Different Approach, CBQ 55 (1993), pp. 244–262.
- Homiletic Name-Derivations as a Literary Device in the Gideon Narrative: Judges vi-viii, VT 43 (1993), pp. 302–317.
- Psalm 60 -- Its Historical Setting, Interpretation, Associations and Meaning, Beit Mikra 39 (1994), pp. 193–209 (Hebrew).
- Puns Upon Letter Names in the Acrostic Units of the Hebrew Bible, Beit Mikra 39 (1994), pp. 313–334 (Hebrew).
- The Biblical Origin of the Place Name of the Valley of Theropoeon in Jerusalem, Mentioned by Josephus Flavius, Beit Mikra 40 (1995), pp. 127–134 (Hebrew).
- Torn Between Prophet and Necromancer: Saul's Despair (1 Sam 28,3-15), Beit Mikra 41(1), pp. 172–194 (English Section).
- Elements of History and Reality in the Description of the Ela Valley Warfare and the Combat Between David and Goliath (1 Sam 17), Beit Mikra 41 (1997), pp. 293–316 (Hebrew).
- The Battle of Mizpa (1 Sam 7)--Between History and Historiography, in Y. Hoffman and F. Polak (eds.), A Light for Jacob in Memory of J.S. Licht, Bialik and Tel Aviv Un. Jerusalem: 1997, pp. 78–89.(Hebrew).
- The Structure and Contents of Chronicles as a Veiled Polemic Against the Samaritans, Beit Mikra 41 (1997), pp. 293–314. (Hebrew); English version: The Structure and Contents of Chronicles as a Veiled Polemic against the Samaritans, in: Joshua Schwartz et al. (eds.), Jerusalem and Eretz Israel, Arie Kindler Volume, The Ingeborg Rennert Center for Jerusalem Studies and Eretz Israel Museum, Tel Aviv: 2000, pp. 42–60 (the English Section).
- Wordplays, Puns and Puns Upon Names as a Literary Rhetorical Device in the Book of Samuel, Beit Mikra 42 (1998), pp. 1–4 (Hebrew). English version: Word Play and Puns as a Rhetorical Device in the Book of Samuel, in S. B. Noegel (ed.), Puns and Pundits: Word Play in the Hebrew Bible and Ancient Near Eastern Literature, CDL Press, Bethesda, Maryland: 2000, pp. 181–204.
- David's Warfare Against the Philistines in the Vicinity of Jerusalem (2 Sam 5,17-25; 1 Chron 14,8-16), in: G. Galil and M. Weinfeld (eds.), Studies in Historical Geography and Biblical Historiography: Presented to Zecharia Kallai, Sup. VT, vol. LXXXI, Brill, Leiden: 2000, pp. 150–164.
- The Portrayal of David's Census in 1 Chr. 21 in Light of the Parallel Account in 2 Sam.24, in M. Garsiel et al. (eds.), Studies in Bible and Exegesis, vol. V, Presented to Uriel Simon, Bar-Ilan University Press, Raman Gan: 2000, pp. 137–160 (Hebrew).
- King Saul in Distress: Torn Between Samuel the Prophet and a She Necromancer (1 Sam. 3-25), in: R. Kasher, and M. Zippor (eds.), Studies in Bible and Exegesis. Vol VI, Yehuda Komlosh - In Memoriam, Bar-Ilan University Press, Raman Gan 2002, pp. 25–45.
- Revealing and Concealing as a Narrative Strategy in Solomon's Judgment: First Kings 3:16-18, CBQ 64 (2002), pp. 229–247.
- The Water Retrieval Mission of David's Three Warriors and Its Relationship to the Battle of the Valley of Rephaim, in M. Heltzer & M. Malul (eds.), Teshurot LaAvishur: Studies in the Bible and the Ancient Near East, in Hebrew and Semitic Languages, Archaeological Center Publications, Old Jaffa, Israel: 2004, pp. 51–62 (English Section).

A different Hebrew version in A. Faust and E. Baruch (eds.), New Studies on Jerusalem 8: Proceedings of Eighth Conference, December 26th 2002, Ingeborg Rennert Center for Jerusalem Studies, Ramat-Gan: 2002, pp. 25-38.

- Two Harlot Mothers and One Living Infant - Three Riddles in Solomon's Judgment, Beit Mikra, 2003, pp. 32–53 (Hebrew).
- Puns on Names as a Literary Device in the Book of Judges, Beit Mikra 53 (2008), pp. 59–83 (Hebrew.)
- The Elah Valley's Battle, the Duel of David and Goliath and why Goliath's Head and Weapons End up in Jerusalem, New Studies on Jerusalem, vol. 14 (2008), pp. 53–87 (Hebrew.)
- The Four Sons of Rephaim Who Fell in Combats with David and His Heroes, Beit Mikra, 54 (2009), pp. 39–61 (Hebrew).
- The Valley of Elah Battle and the Duel of David with Goliath: Between History and Artistic Theological Historiography, G. Galil, M. Geller, A. Millard (eds.), Homeland And Exile: Biblical and Ancient Near Eastern Studies in Honour of Bustenay Oded, Supplements to Vetus Testamentum 130, Leiden & Boston, Brill: 2009, pp. 391–426.
- “The Book of Samuel: Its Composition, Structure and Significance as a Historiographical Source,” JHS, 10 (2010), article 5 (Internet).
- “David's Elite Warriors and their Exploits in the Books of Samuel and Chronicles,” JHS, vol. 11 (2011), article 5 (internet).
- Ideological Discordance between the Prophets Nathan and Samuel as Reflecting the Divergence between the Book of Samuel's Authors, in G. Galil, A. Gilboa, A.M. Maeir & D. Kahn (eds.), The Ancient Near East in the 12th-10th Centuries BCE: Culture and History, AOAT 392, Münster Ugarit Verlag: 2012, pp. 175–198.
- “Intertextual Dialectics on the Issue of Reward and Punishment: the Case of Psalms 1, Jeremiah 12 and 17,” Beit Mikra 57 (2012), pp, 9-27 [Hebrew; English summary pp. 5*-6*].
- The Relationship between David and Michal, Daughter of King Saul, in M. Garsiel et al. (eds.), Studies in Bible and Exegesis, vol. X, Presented to Shmuel Vargon, Ramat Gan, Bar-Ilan University Press 2011, pp. 117–134 [Hebrew; English summary pp. XI-XII].
- Samuel's Public Speeches and his Admonishes to Saul as Reflecting the Anti-Monarchic Positions of the Second Author of the Book Samuel, in M. Gruber, M.Garsiel, A. Brenner, B. Levine, M. Mor (eds.), Teshurah Le-Zafrirah: Studies in the Bible, the History of Israel and the Ancient Near East, Presented to Zafrirah Ben Barak, Ben-Gurion University in the Negev Press, Beer-sheba: 2012, pp. 135–154 [Hebrew; English summary p. *95].
- Vicissitudes in the Story of the Struggle Between Adonijah and Solomon Revolving around the Jerusalemite Throne Succession of King David (1 Kings 1-2): Historiography, Poetics and Rhetoric, New Studies on Jerusalem 17 (Ramat Gan, Bar-Ilan University: Ingeborg Rennert Center for Jerusalem Stusies, 2011), pp. 107–136 [Hebrew].
- The Battle of Michmash (1 Sam 13-14): History, Historiography, Poetics and Theology Combined" ,” in Kathleen Abraham and Joseph Fleishman (eds.), Looking at the Ancient Near East and the Bible through the Same Eyes: Minha LeAhron--A Tribute to Professor Aaron Skaist, Bethesda, MD: CDL Press: 2012, pp. 25-58.
- The Story of David, Nabal and Abigail (1 Sam 25): A Literary Study of Wordplay on Names, Analogies, and Socially Structured Opposites, in D. Bodi (ed.), Abigail, David's Wife. Her Beauty and Ruse, Hebrew Bible Monographs, 32; Sheffield: Sheffield Phoenix Press: 2013, pp. 66-78.
- Intertextual Dialectics on the Issue of Reward and Punishment: the Case of Psalms 1, Jeremiah 12 and 17, in N. Shupak and Y. Hoffman (eds.), The Wisdom Literature in the Old Testament and in the Ancient Near East, Beit Mikra, 57 (2012) pp. 9-27 (Hebrew; English Summary: pp. 5*-6*).
- “The Succession Rivalry between Adonijah and Solomon (1 Kings 1-2): The Story's Genesis and its Historiographical, Literary and Rhetorical Values,” in C. Gottlieb, Ch. Cohen & M. Gruber (eds.), Visions of Life in Biblical Time: Essays in Honor of Meir Lubetski, Sheffield: Foenix: 2015, pp. 95–127.
- The Significance of Repetitions and Comparisons for Understanding Characters, Points of Views and Messages in the Story of Naboth's Vineyard, Beit Mikra, 60 (2015), pp. 37–64 [Hebrew; English Abstract pp. 6–7].
- Who is Eshbaal Son of Bda Whose Name Inserted on a Jar from Khirbet Qeiafa? in New Studies on Jerusalem, vol 21, Ingeborg Rennert Center for Jerusalem Studies, Bar-Ilan University, Ramat-Gan 2015, English section, pp. *23 – *7.
- Eshbaal Son of Bda Inscription Exposed in David's Fortress at Qeiyafa: Its Interpretation and Significance for the Period's History In Be-Maaveh HaHar, in the Highland's Depth Ephraim Range and Binyamin Research Studies vol. 6, 2016, pp 219 – 236 (Hebrew).
