= Jerahmeel =

Given name

The name Jerahmeel (Hebrew יְרַחְמְאֵל, Yəraḥməʾēl; Greek ιραμεηλ) appears several times in the Tanakh. It means "He will obtain mercy of God", "God pities", "May God have compassion", or "May God pity".

== Bearers of the name ==
There are probably three distinct persons of that name in the Tanakh. In order of their lifetimes they are:

1. a son of Hezron and great-grandson of Judah, the son of Jacob, as given in the extended genealogies in 1 Chronicles 2:9, 2:25–26 and 2:42.
2. a son of Kish, one of the Levites appointed by David to administer the temple worship, as described in 1 Chronicles 24:29.
3. a son of the king, sent with others by Jehoiakim to arrest Baruch ben Neriah and Jeremiah the prophet, as given in Jeremiah 36:26. An old bulla with the inscription "Jerahmeel the king's son" has been found and considered authentic.

== The Jerahmeelites ==
The Jerahmeelites were a people, presumably descended from Jerahmeel number 1 above, living in the Negev, who David, while in service with the Philistines, claimed to have attacked in 1 Samuel 27:10, but with whom he was really on friendly terms according to 1 Samuel 30:29.

Thomas Kelly Cheyne developed a theory that made the Jerahmeelites into a significant part of the history of Israel but most subsequent scholars have dismissed his ideas as fanciful.

== An archangel ==
In some deuterocanonical and apocryphal writings, there are references to an archangel variously called Jeremiel, Eremiel, Remiel, etc. See the article Jerahmeel (archangel).

== Chronicles of Jerahmeel ==
The Chronicles of Jerahmeel is a medieval document ascribed to the 12th-century Jewish historian Jerahmeel ben Solomon. It is unrelated to any of the above.
