= Geshurites =

People in the Hebrew Bible

The Geshurites (Hebrew: גְּשׁוּרִי Gəšūrī) were a people who dwelt in the desert between Arabia and Philistia; in the latter citation the Geshurites are mentioned together with the Gezerites and Amalekites, each of whose areas were attacked by David and his men who "did not leave a man or woman alive", in order that there would be none to tell the Philistine king Achish, whose protection David was under, that David was raiding against them, rather than against Israelites as he claimed.

According to Richard Elliott Friedman, the mother of Tamar and Absalom was "a Geshurite princess".
