= Aren Maeir =

Israeli archaeologist

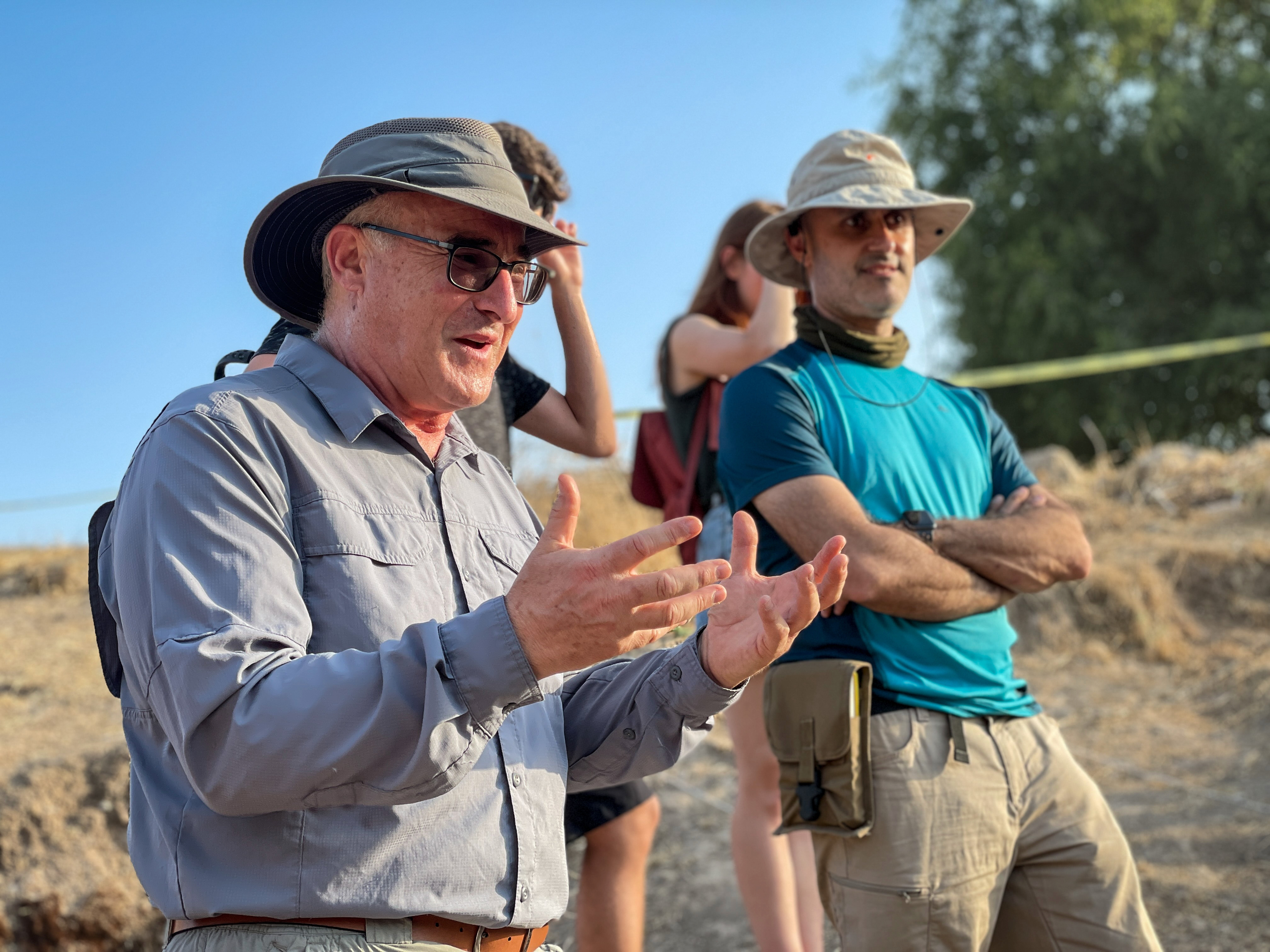
Aren Maeir (left) at Tell es-Safi

Aren Maeir (Hebrew: ארן מאיר; born 1958) is an American-born Israeli archaeologist and professor in the Department of Land of Israel Studies and Archaeology at Bar-Ilan University. He is director of the Tell es-Safi/Gath Archaeological Project.

== Biography ==
Aren Maeir was born in Rochester, New York, United States. He immigrated to Israel in 1969 and has lived there since. Following his service in the Israel Defense Forces (where he reached the rank of captain), he did his undergraduate and graduate studies at the Hebrew University in Jerusalem (PhD 1997 summa cum laude), and did a post-doctorate (2002-2003) at the (now defunct) Dibner Institute for the History of Science and Technology at MIT. He has been teaching at Bar-Ilan University since 1992.

== Archaeology and academic career ==
He has participated in, and directed, numerous archaeological excavations in Israel, including at the following sites: Jerusalem, Hazor, Yoqneam, Tell Qasile, Beth-Shean, and since 1996, at Tell es-Safi/Gath. He is married to Adina (née Hartman), and they have three sons and four grandchildren.

His expertise lies in the Bronze and Iron Age cultures of the Eastern Mediterranean, with special emphasis on those of the Ancient Levant. Among the topics that he has studied are: ancient trade; metallurgy; pottery production and provenance; scientific applications in archaeology; archaeological survey; the archaeology of Jerusalem; the Middle Bronze Age of the Levant; chronology of the 2nd Millennium BCE; the Sea Peoples and the Philistines; relations between Egypt and the Levant; ancient weapons and warfare; ancient cult and religion.

Between 2005 and 2007 he served as the Chairman of the Martin (Szusz) Department of Land of Israel Studies and Archaeology () at Bar-Ilan University. Along with Prof. Steve Weiner of the Weizmann Institute of Science in Rehovot, he initiated and co-directed the now defunct joint Bar-Ilan University/Weizmann Institute of Science program in Archaeological Science. He currently (2020-) is the director of the Institute of Archaeology at Bar-Ilan University, co-director of the Minerva Center for the Relations between Israel and Aram in Biblical Times (RIAB; aramisrael.org), director of the Ingeborg Rennert Center for Jerusalem Studies, and co-editor of the Israel Exploration Journal.

Since 1996 he has directed the Ackerman Family Bar-Ilan University Expedition to Gath, excavating the ancient site of Tell es-Safi, which is identified as Canaanite and Philistine Gath (one of the five cities of the Philistines mentioned in the Bible, the home of Goliath). Over the years, he has written and edited, close to 20 volumes and published around 300 papers.

== Selected works ==
- Ackermann, O., A. Faust, and A. Maeir, eds. 2005. Archaeology and Environment: Conference proceedings. In Hebrew. Ramat-Gan: Bar-Ilan University.
- Ben-Shlomo, D., I. Shai, and A. Maeir. 2004. Late Philistine Decorated Ware (“Ashdod Ware”): Typology, Chronology and Production Centers. Bulletin of the American Schools of Oriental Research 335 (August):1-35.
- Ben-Shlomo, D., I. Shai, A. Zukerman, and A. Maeir. 2008. Cooking Identities: Aegean-Style and Philistine Cooking Jugs and Cultural Interaction in the Southern Levant during the Iron Age. American Journal of Archaeology 112(2), April:225-46.
- Maeir, A. 1997. The material culture of the Central and Northern Jordan valley in the Middle Bronze Age II: Pottery and settlement pattern. Ph.D. diss. Jerusalem: Hebrew University.
- ------. 1997. T.1181, area L, Hazor: A multiple interment burial cave of the MBIIA/B period. In Hazor V, ed. A. Ben-Tor, 295-340. Jerusalem.
- ------. 2004. Bronze and Iron Age Tombs at Tel Gezer, Israel: Finds from the Excavations by Raymond-Charles Weill in 1914 and 1921. N. Panitz-Cohen, et al. British Archaeological Reports International Series 1206. Oxford: Archaeopress.
- ------. 2004. The Historical Background and Dating of Amos VI 2: An Archaeological Perspective from Tell es-Safi/Gath. Vetus Testamentum 54(3):319-34.
- ------. 2008. The Middle Bronze Age II Pottery. In Excavations at Tel Beth-Shean 1989-1996, Volume II: The Middle and Late Bronze Age Strata in Area R, ed. A. Mazar and R. Mullins, 242-389. Jerusalem: Israel Exploration Society.
- ------. 2008. Zafit, Tel. In The New Encyclopedia of Archaeological Excavations in the Holy Land 5: Supplementary volume, ed. E. Stern, 2079-81. Jerusalem: Israel Exploration Society.
- ------. 2010 Stones, Bones, Texts and Relevance: Or How I Lost My Fear of Biblical Archaeology and Started Enjoying It. Pp. 295–303 in Historical Biblical Archaeology and the Future: The New Pragmatism, ed. T. Levy. London: Equinox.
- ------. 2010 “And Brought in the Offerings and the Tithes and the Dedicated Things Faithfully” (II Chron 31:12): On the Meaning and Function of the Late Iron Age Judahite “Incised Handle Cooking Pot.” Journal of the American Oriental Society 130(1):43–62.
- ------. 2008 Aegean Feasting and Other Indo-European Elements in the Philistine Household. Pp. 347–52 in DAIS - the Aegean Feast: Proceedings of the 12th Annual International Aegean Conference, Melbourne 25–29 March 2008, eds. R. Laffineur and L. Hitchcock. Aegeaum 29. Liege: University of Liege.
- ------. 2010 “In the Midst of the Jordan”: The Jordan Valley During the Middle Bronze Age (Ca. 2000–1500 BCE) - Archaeological and Historical Correlates. Contributions to the Chronology of the Eastern Mediterranean, Vol. 26. Vienna: Österreichischen Akademie der Wissenschaften.
- ------. 2011 . The Archaeology of earliest Jerusalem: From the late Proto-Historic periods (ca. 5th Millennium BCE) to the end of the Bronze Age (ca. 1200 BCE). In Jerusalem in Perspective: 150 Years of Archaeological Research. Proceedings of the Conference held at Brown University November 12–14, 2006, ed. K. Galor and G. Avni. Winona Lake, IN: Eisenbrauns.
- Maeir, A., and P. de Miroschedji, eds. 2006. “I Will Speak the Riddles of Ancient Times”: Archaeological and Historical Studies in Honor of Amihai Mazar on the Occasion of his Sixtieth Birthday. Winona Lake, IN: Eisenbrauns.
- Maeir, A., and J. Yellin. 2008. Instrumental Neutron Activation Analysis of selected pottery from Tel Beth Shean and the Central Jordan Valley. In Excavations at Tel Beth-Shean 1989-1996, Volume II: The Middle and Late Bronze Age Strata in Area R, ed. A. Mazar and R. Mullins, 554-71. Jerusalem: Israel Exploration Society.
- ------. 2012. Tell es-Safi/Gath I: Report on the 1996–2005 Seasons. Ägypten und Altes Testament 69. Wiesbaden: Harrassowitz.
- ------. 2012. Insights on the Philistine Culture and Related Issues: An Overview of 15 Years of Work at Tell es-Safi/Gath. Pp. 345–403 in The Ancient Near East in the 12th-10th Centuries BCE, Culture and History: Proceedings of the International Conference Held in the University of Haifa, 2–5 May 2010, eds. G. Galil, A. Gilboa, A. M. Maeir and D. Kahn. Alter Orient und Altes Testament 392. Münster: Ugarit-Verlag.
- ------. 2012. Philistia and the Judean Shephelah After Hazael: The Power Play Between the Philistines, Judeans and Assyrians in the 8th Century BCE in Light of the Excavations at Tell es-Safi/Gath. Pp. 241–62 in Disaster and Relief Management - Katastrophen und ihre Bewältigung, ed. A. Berlejung. Forschungen zum Alten Testament 81. Tübingen: Mohr Siebeck.
- ------. 2013. Review of: A. Faust. 2012. The Archaeology of Israelite Society. Eisenbrauns: Winona Lake, IN. Review of Biblical Literature.
- Meiri, M., Huchon, D., Bar-Oz, G., Boaretto, E., Kolska Horwitz, L., Maeir, A. M., Sapir-Hen, L., Larson, G., Weiner, S., and Finkelstein, I. 2013. Ancient DNA and Population Turnover in Southern Levantine Pigs- Signature of the Sea Peoples Migration? Scientific Reports 3 : 3035 | DOI: 10.1038/srep03035.
