= Tell es-Safi =

Archaeological mound in Israel

Tell es-Safi تلّ الصافي Tel Tzafit
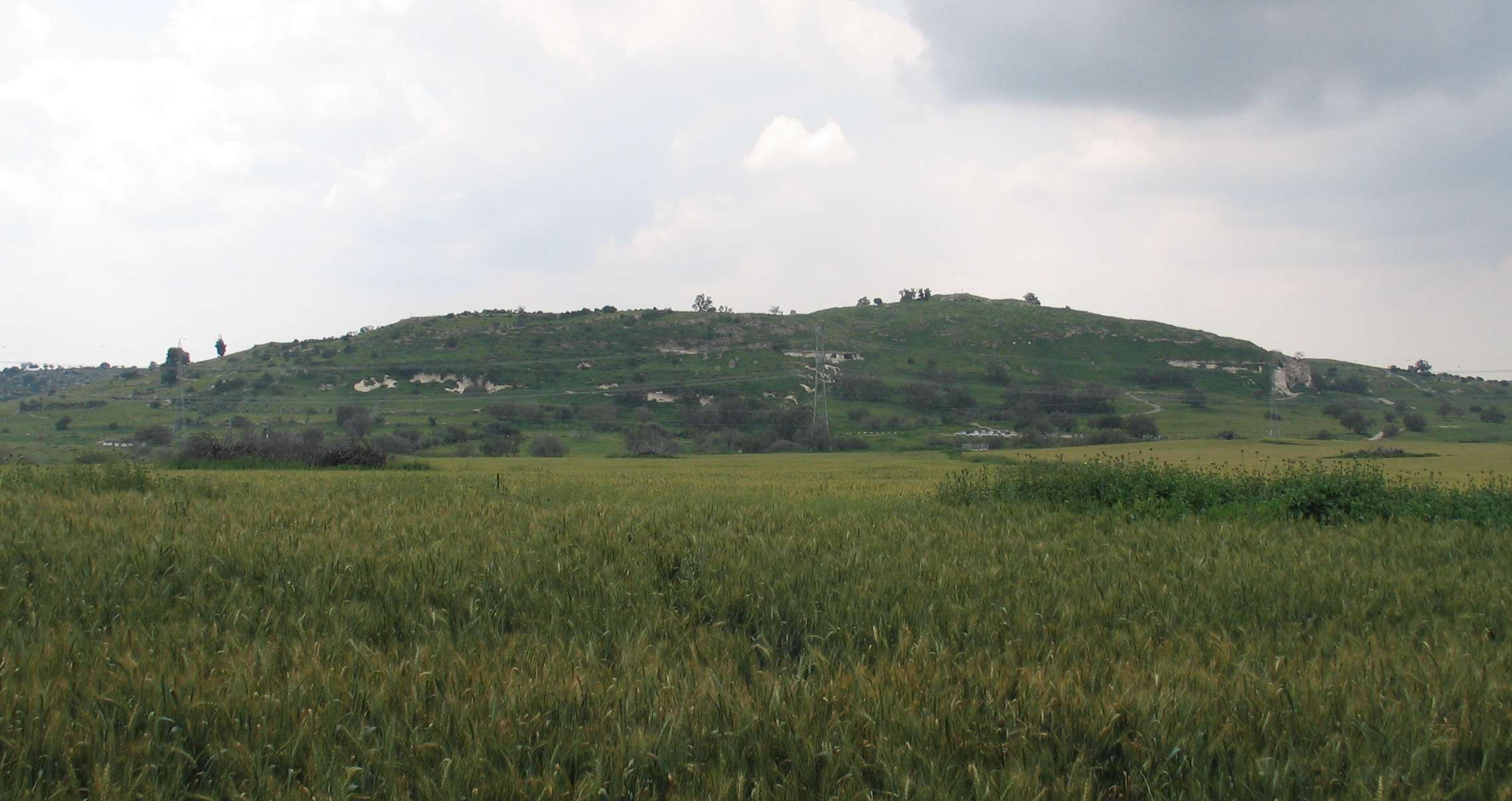

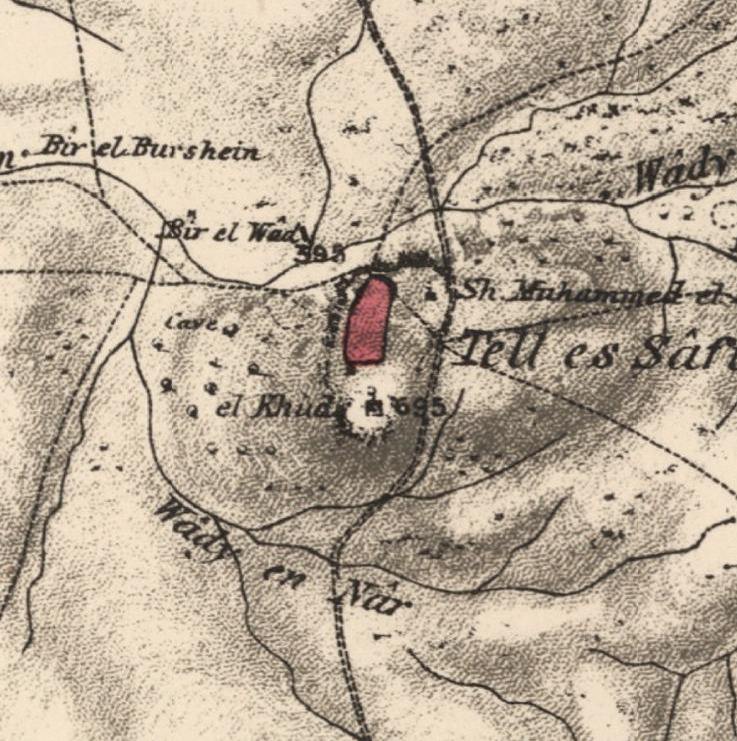
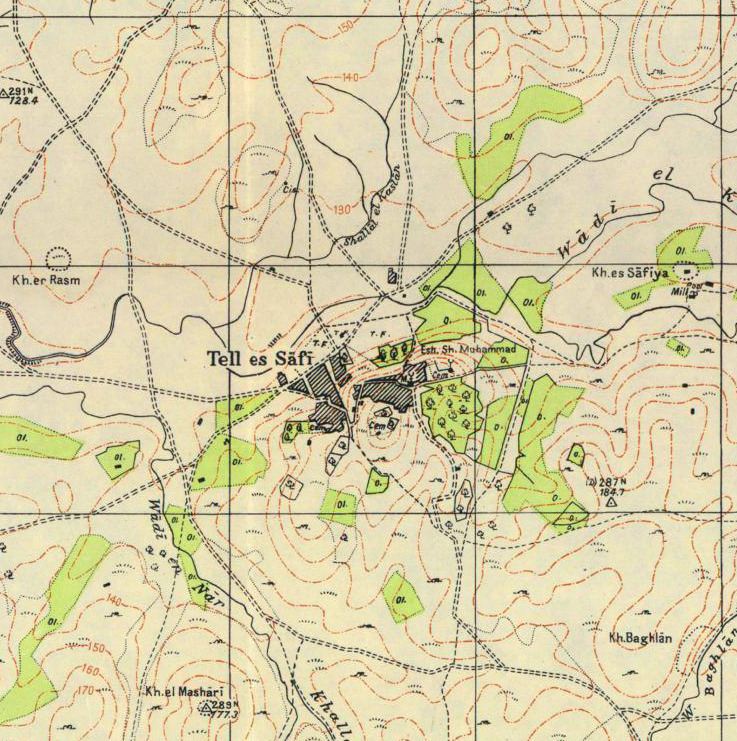
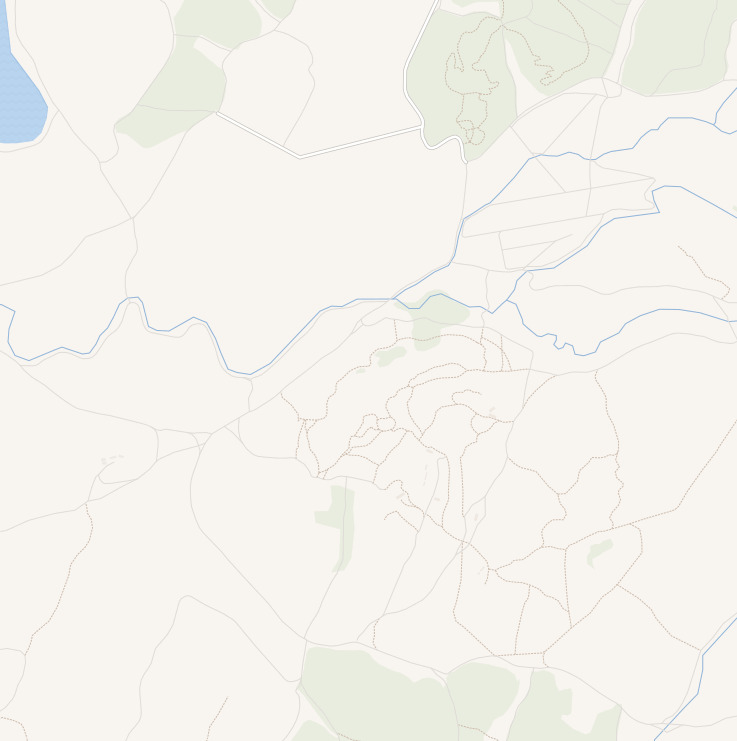
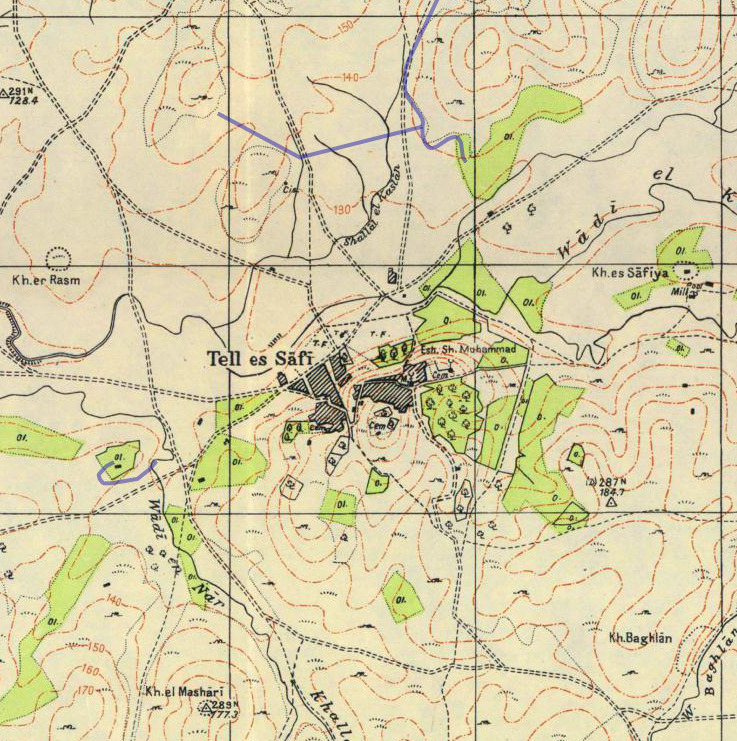
- 1870s map 1940s map modern map 1940s with modern overlay map A series of historical maps of the area around Tell es-Safi (click the buttons)

- Location within Israel
- Coordinates: 31°42′15″N 34°50′49″E
- Palestine grid: 135/123
- Geopolitical entity: Israel
- Subdistrict: Hebron
- Date of depopulation: 9–10 July 1948

Area
  - Total: 27,794 dunams (27.794 km^{2}; 10.731 sq mi)

Population (1945)
  - Total: 1,290
- Cause(s) of depopulation: Military assault by Yishuv forces

Tell es-Safi (Arabic: تل الصافي, romanized: Tall aṣ-Ṣāfī, "White hill"; Hebrew: תל צפית, Tel Tzafit) was an Arab Palestinian village, located in the Shephelah region on the southern banks of Wadi 'Ajjur, 35 kilometers (22 mi) northwest of Hebron, which had its Arab population expelled during the 1948 Arab–Israeli war. Archaeological excavations show that the site (a tell or archaeological mound) was continuously inhabited since the 5th millennium BCE, and it is widely identified with the Philistine city of Gath.

The site appears on the 6th-century Madaba Map as Saphitha, while the Crusaders called it Blanche Garde. It is mentioned by Arab geographers in the 13th and 16th centuries. Under the Ottoman Empire, it was part of the district of Gaza. In modern times, the houses were built of sun-dried brick. The villagers were Muslim and cultivated cereals and orchards.

Today the site, known as Tel Tzafit, is an Israeli national park incorporating archaeological remains which are generally, if not by all, identified as the Philistine city of Gath, mentioned in the Hebrew Bible. The remains of the Crusader fort and the Arab village can also be seen on the tell.

== Names ==
The 6th-century Madaba Map calls it Saphitha. In the 19th century the white chalk cliff at the site was seen as the cause for the Arabic name: Tell es-Safi means 'clear or bright mound'. The name used in the Crusader period was Blanche Garde, 'White Fortress' in French, and Alba Specula ('White Lookout/Watch-tower') or Alba Custodia ('White Guard') in Latin.

== Geography ==
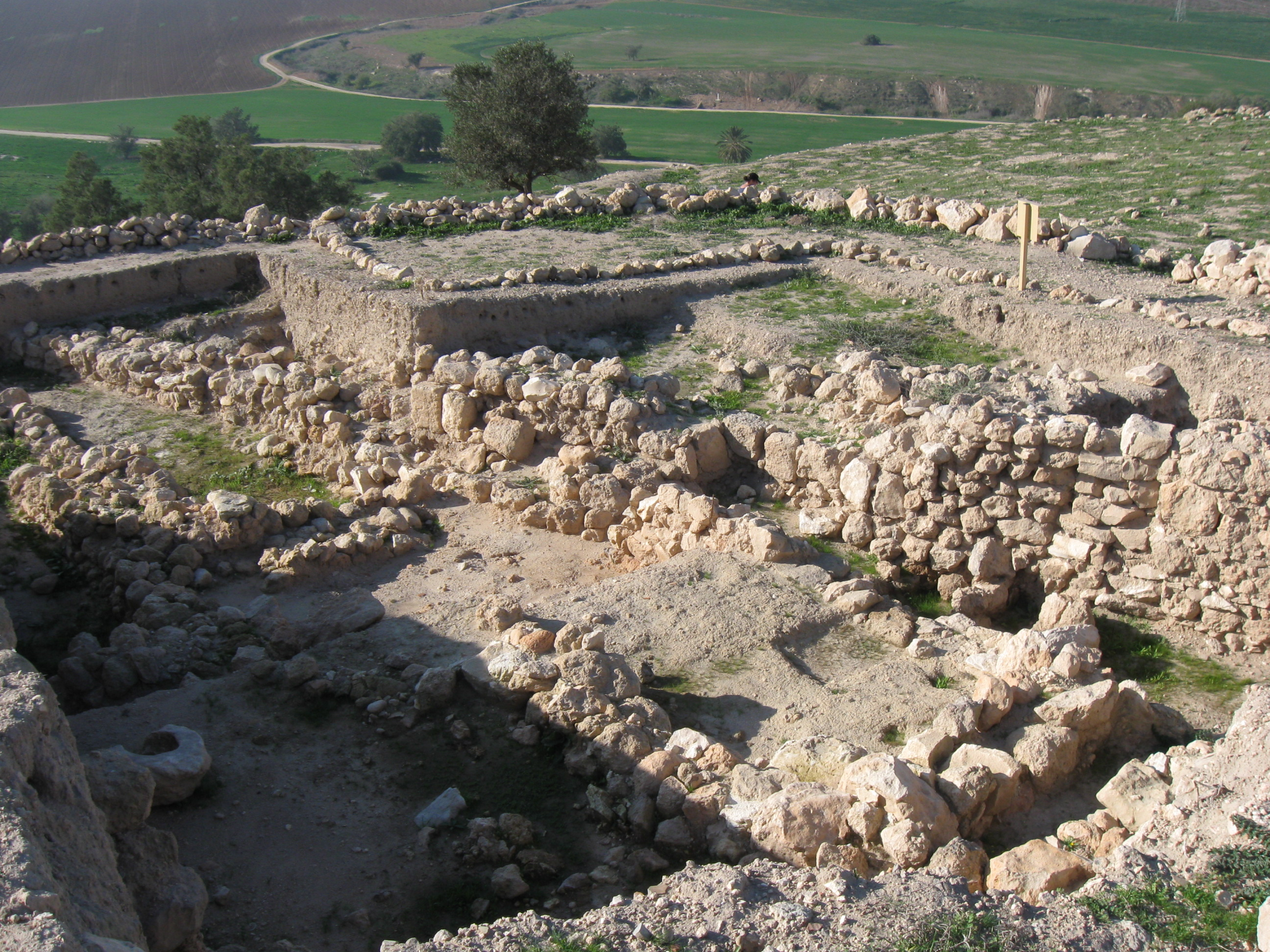
Tel Tzafit excavations

Tell es-Safi sits on a site 300 feet (91 m) above the plain of Philistia and 700 feet (210 m) above sea level, and its white-faced precipices can be seen from the north and west from several hours distant. Tell es-Safi is situated between the Israeli cities of Ashkelon and Beit Shemesh and is one of the country's largest Bronze and Iron Age sites.

== Identification with Gath ==
Victor Guérin thought that Tell es-Safi was the "watch-tower" mentioned in Joshua 15:38, based on its etymological meaning, but the site is now believed to be the site of the Philistine city of Gath. The identification was opposed by Albright, who noted its proximity to another leading city from the Philistine league, Ekron (Tel Miqne), but later excavations turned up more supportive evidence for Tell es-Safi.

Schniedewind writes that Gath was important for the Philistines in the eighth century BCE because of its easily defended geographical position. Albright argued that Tell es-Safi was too close to Tel Miqne/Ekron to be Gath. The sites are only 8 km apart. However, both Tell es-Safi and Tel Miqne were major sites in the Middle Bronze through the Iron Age. The agricultural features of this region of the southern coastal plain may be part of the explanation. Additionally, there is no certainty that the two sites flourished simultaneously. Literary sources suggest that Gath flourished in the Late Bronze and Early Iron Ages until its destruction by the Assyrians in the late eighth century BCE. The heyday of Ekron was the seventh century BCE, after the site was taken over by the Assyrians as an agricultural administrative center (Dothan and Gitin 1993).

== History and archaeology ==
Excavations at Tell es-Safi since 1996 indicate that the site was settled "virtually continuously from the Chalcolithic until the modern periods."

=== Early Bronze Age ===
The site was already a significant settlement in the Early Bronze Age with an estimated area of 24 hectares. Finds from this period include a hippopotamus ivory cylinder seal, found inside a holemouth jar in a well stratified EB III (c. 2700/2600 – 2350 BCE) context. The motif was that of a crouching male lion.

=== Late Bronze Age ===
Stratigraphic evidence attests to settlement in the Late Bronze and Iron Age (I & II) periods. By the Late Bronze Age the site had reached an extent of 34 hectares. A find of a hieratic inscribed LBA bowl fragment (19th - 20th Dynasty) reflects the Egyptian contacts common in this region during this period.

=== Iron Age ===
==== Philistine presence ====
There is stratigraphic evidence for settlement in the Iron Age I & II periods. A large city in the Iron Age, the site was "enclosed on three sides by a large man-made siege-moat."

Radiocarbon dating published in 2015 showed an early appearance of Philistine material culture in the city. According to 2010 reports, Israeli archaeologists uncovered evidence of the first Philistine settlement in Canaan, as well as a Philistine temple and evidence of a major earthquake in biblical times.

The Tell es-Safi inscription, dated to the 10th century BCE, was found at the site in 2005.

Archaeologists have discovered a horned altar dating to the 9th century BCE. The stone artefact is over 3 feet (one meter) tall, and is the earliest ever found in Philistia. It features a pair of horns, similar to the ancient Israelite altars described in the Hebrew Bible (Exodus 27:1–2; 1 Kings 1:50), the Israelite altars however typically have four horns, such as found in Tel Be'er Sheva, for example, as opposed to two.

The 2010 reports mention evidence of destruction by King Hazael of Aram-Damascus around 830 BCE.

=== Byzantine period ===
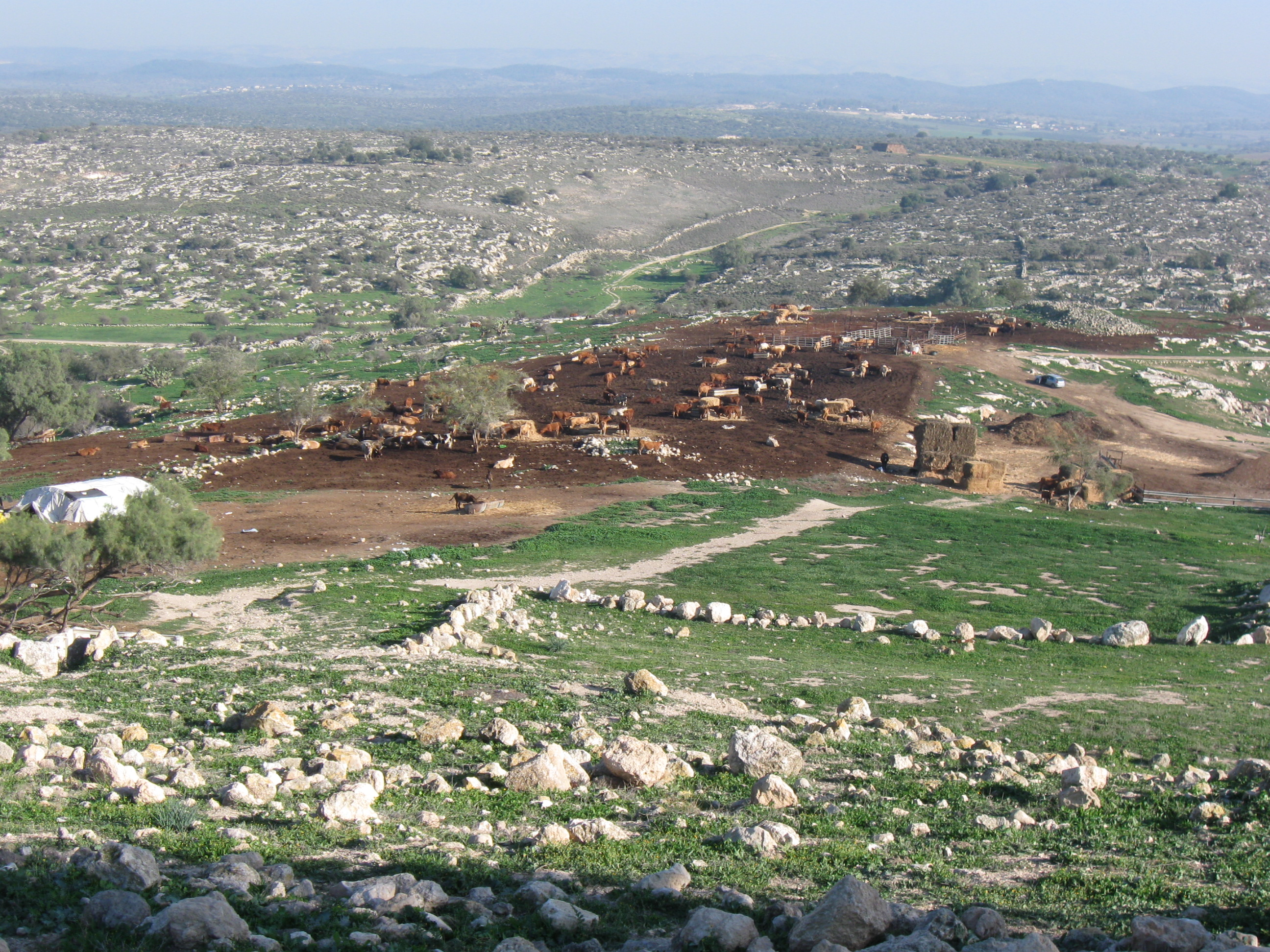
View from the mound to the east

The place appears on the Madaba Map as Saphitha (Greek: CΑΦΙΘΑ).

=== Crusader and Ayyubid period ===
During the Crusades, the site was called Blanchegarde ("White guard"), likely referring to the white rock outcrop next to the site. In 1142, a fort was built on the site by King Fulk. After the Siege of Ascalon in 1153, the castle was expanded and strengthened. It became a lordship in 1166, when it was given to Walter III Brisebarre, lord of Beirut.

It was dismantled after being taken by Saladin in 1191, but reconstructed by Richard the Lionheart in 1192. Richard was nearly captured while inspecting his troops next to the site.

In 1253, Gilles (fr)' son Raoul (fr) (died after 1265) was documented as lord of Blanchegarde. In 1265, the Baron Amalric Barlais, who was loyal to the Hohenstaufen, took over the rule of Blanchegarde. Shortly thereafter Blanchegarde was retaken by Muslim forces. The remnants of the square castle and its four towers served as a place of some importance in the village well into the 19th century.

Yaqut al-Hamawi, writing in the 1220s, described the place as a fort near Bayt Jibrin in the Ramleh area.

=== Mamluk period ===
The Arab geographer Mujir al-Din al-Hanbali noted around 1495 that a village by this name was within the administrative jurisdiction of Gaza.

=== Ottoman period ===
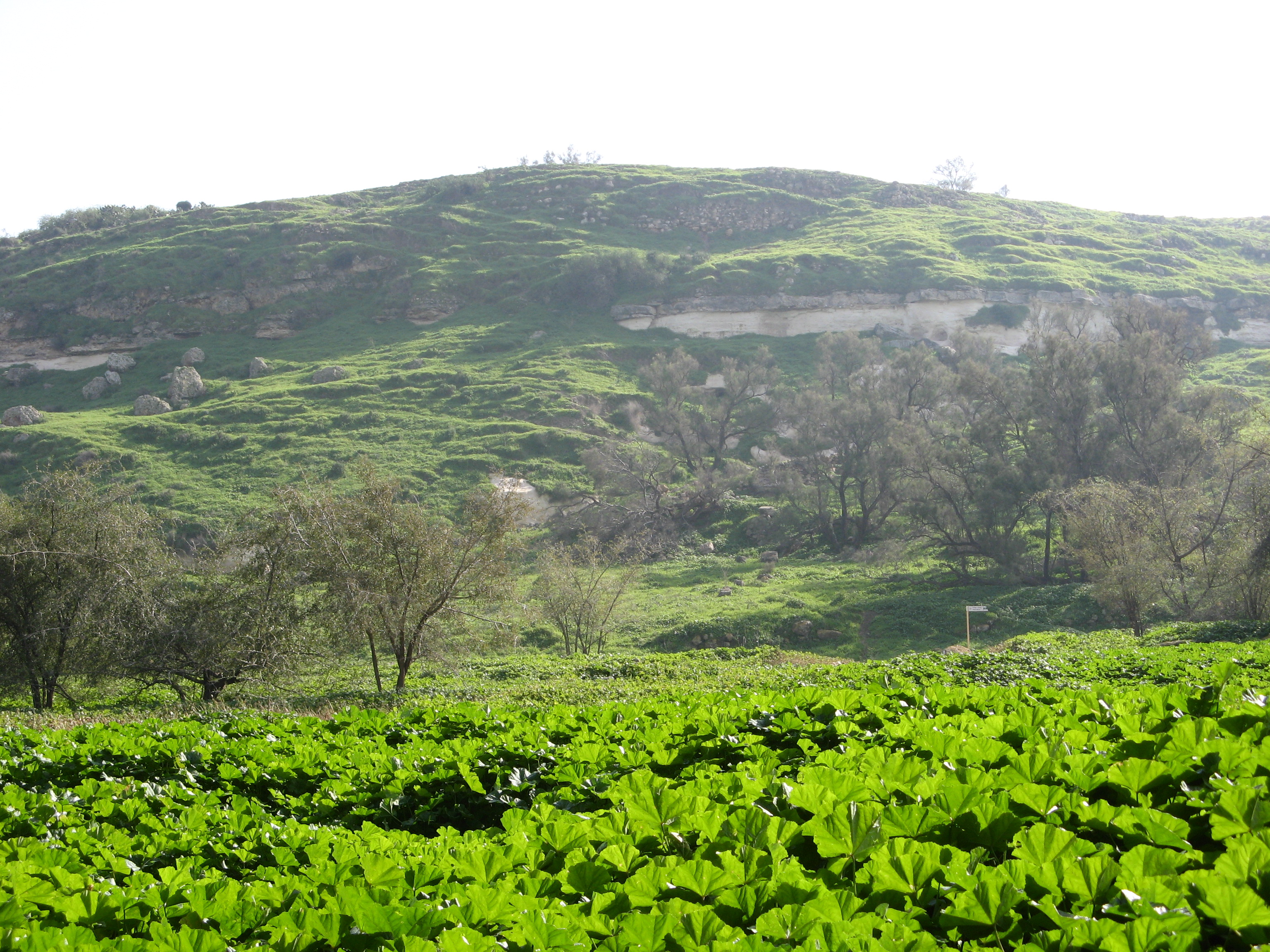
Tel es-Safi

The village was incorporated into the Ottoman Empire in 1517 with all of Palestine, and in 1596 it appeared in the tax registers being in the nahiya (subdistrict) of Gaza under Gaza Sanjak, with a population of 88 Muslim households; an estimated 484 persons. The villagers paid a fixed tax rate of 25% on a number of crops, including wheat, barley and sesame, and fruits, as well as goats and beehives; a total of 13,300 akçe.

In 1838 Edward Robinson described Tell es-Safieh as a Muslim village in the Gaza district. It was "an isolated oblong hill or ridge, lying from N.to S. in the plain, the highest part being towards the South. The village lies near the middle; lower down."

The Sheikh, Muhammed Sellim, belonged to the 'Azzeh family of Bayt Jibrin. After his family took part in the Peasants' Revolt of 1834, his father and uncle were beheaded and the remaining family was ordered to take up residence at Tell es-Safi.

When Victor Guérin visited in 1863, he saw two small Muslim walīs. An Ottoman village list drawn up around 1870 counted 34 houses and a population of 165 men.

In 1883, the PEF's Survey of Western Palestine described Tell al-Safi as a village built of adobe brick with a well in the valley to the north. James Hastings notes that the village contained a sacred wely.

In 1896, the population was around 495 persons.

=== British Mandate ===
In the 1922 census of Palestine conducted by the British Mandate authorities, Tal al-Safi had a population of 644 inhabitants, all Muslims, increasing in the 1931 census to 925, still all Muslim, in a total of 208 inhabited houses.

The villagers of Tall al-Safi had a mosque, a marketplace, and a shrine for a local sage called Shaykh Mohammad. In the 1945 statistics, the total population was 1,290, all Muslims, and the land area was 27,794 dunams of land. Of this, a total of 19,716 dunums of land were used for cereals, 696 dunums were irrigated or used for orchards, while 68 dunams were classified as built-up (urban) areas.

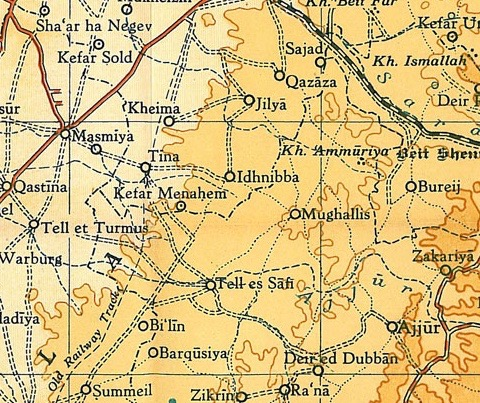
Tell es-Safi 1945 1:250,000

=== Israel ===
==== 1948 war ====
In 1948, Tell es-Safi was the destination for the women and children of Qastina, sent away by the menfolk of Qastina at this time, but they returned after discovering there was insufficient water in the host village to meet the newcomers' needs.

On 7 July, Givati commander Shimon Avidan issued orders to the 51st Battalion to take the Tall al-Safi area and "to destroy, to kill and to expel [lehashmid, leharog, u´legaresh] refugees encamped in the area, in order to prevent enemy infiltration from the east to this important position." According to Benny Morris, the nature of the written order and, presumably, accompanying oral explanations, probably left little doubt in the battalion OC's minds that Avidan wanted the area cleared of inhabitants.

==== Arab village remains ====
In 1992, Walid Khalidi wrote that the site was overgrown with wild vegetation, mainly foxtail and thorny plants, interspersed with cactuses, date-palm and olive trees. He noted the remains of a well and the crumbling stone walls of a pool. The surrounding land was planted by Israeli farmers with citrus trees, sunflowers, and grain. A few tents belonging to Bedouin were occasionally pitched nearby.

==== National park ====
The site is now an Israeli national park and the site of ongoing archaeological excavations.

== Archaeological exploration ==
The site was visited in 1875 by Claude Reignier Conder who was impressed with its height and position in the landscape but not impressed by the "insolent peasants". The only visible remains were those of the Crusader era fortress.

The first excavations at the site began in 1899 when Frederick J. Bliss and R. A. Stewart Macalister worked for three seasons on behalf of the Palestine Exploration Fund. While in the early days of archaeology the methods of Bliss were reasonably advanced for those days. The excavation failed in its primary goal of firmly identifying the site as Gath but did properly work out the stratigraphy.

In the 1950 and 1960s, Moshe Dayan conducted illegal digs at Tell es-Safi and other sites. Some of the robber holes can still be seen at the site today. Many of the objects from these digs ended up at the Israel Museum in Jerusalem.

Since 1996, the site has been excavated by the Tell es-Safi/Gath Project led by Aren Maeir, still ongoing as of 2024.

== See also ==
- Archaeology of Israel
- Cities of the ancient Near East
- Gath (city)
- Tourism in Israel
- Vassals of the Kingdom of Jerusalem
- Tell (archaeology)

== Bibliography ==
- Barron, J.B., ed. (1923). Palestine: Report and General Abstracts of the Census of 1922. Government of Palestine.
- Bromiley, G.W. (1982). International Standard Bible Encyclopedia. Vol. II: E-J. Wm. B. Eerdmans. ISBN 0-8028-3782-4.
- Clermont-Ganneau, C.S. (1896). [ARP] Archaeological Researches in Palestine 1873-1874, translated from the French by J. McFarlane. Vol. 2. London: Palestine Exploration Fund. ( p.440. )
- Conder, C.R.; Kitchener, H.H. (1882). The Survey of Western Palestine: Memoirs of the Topography, Orography, Hydrography, and Archaeology. Vol. 2. London: Committee of the Palestine Exploration Fund.
- Department of Statistics (1945). Village Statistics, April, 1945. Government of Palestine.
- Guérin, V. (1869). Description Géographique Historique et Archéologique de la Palestine (in French). Vol. 1: Judee, pt. 2. Paris: L'Imprimerie Nationale.
- Hadawi, S. (1970). Village Statistics of 1945: A Classification of Land and Area ownership in Palestine. Palestine Liberation Organization Research Center.
- Hartmann, M. (1883). "Die Ortschaftenliste des Liwa Jerusalem in dem türkischen Staatskalender für Syrien auf das Jahr 1288 der Flucht (1871)". Zeitschrift des Deutschen Palästina-Vereins. 6: 102–149.
- Hastings, J.; Driver, S.R. (2004). A Dictionary of the Bible: Volume II: (Part I: Feign – Hyssop). The Minerva Group, Inc. ISBN 9781410217240.
- Hütteroth, W.-D.; Abdulfattah, K. (1977). Historical Geography of Palestine, Transjordan and Southern Syria in the Late 16th Century. Erlanger Geographische Arbeiten, Sonderband 5. Erlangen, Germany: Vorstand der Fränkischen Geographischen Gesellschaft. ISBN 3-920405-41-2.
- Kallai-Kleinmann, Z. (1958). "The Town Lists of Judah, Simeon, Benjamin and Dan". Vetus Testamentum. 8 (2). Leiden: Brill: 134–160. doi:10.2307/1516086. JSTOR 1516086.
- Khalidi, W. (1992). All That Remains: The Palestinian Villages Occupied and Depopulated by Israel in 1948. Washington D.C.: Institute for Palestine Studies. ISBN 0-88728-224-5.
- Le Strange, G. (1890). Palestine Under the Moslems: A Description of Syria and the Holy Land from A.D. 650 to 1500. London: Committee of the Palestine Exploration Fund.
- Macalister, R.A.S. (1925). A century of excavation in Palestine. London: The Religious Tract Society. (pp. 51, 56, 59, 124, 189, 275)
- Mills, E., ed. (1932). Census of Palestine 1931. Population of Villages, Towns and Administrative Areas. Jerusalem: Government of Palestine.
- Morris, B. (2004). The Birth of the Palestinian Refugee Problem Revisited. Cambridge University Press. ISBN 978-0-521-00967-6.
- Negev, A.; Gibson, S. (2005). Archaeological Encyclopedia of the Holy Land. Continuum International Publishing Group. ISBN 9780826485717.
- Palmer, E.H. (1881). The Survey of Western Palestine: Arabic and English Name Lists Collected During the Survey by Lieutenants Conder and Kitchener, R. E. Transliterated and Explained by E.H. Palmer. Committee of the Palestine Exploration Fund.
- Petersen, Andrew (2001). A Gazetteer of Buildings in Muslim Palestine (British Academy Monographs in Archaeology). Vol. 1. Oxford University Press. ISBN 978-0-19-727011-0. (pp. 291–292)
- Pringle, D. (1997). Secular buildings in the Crusader Kingdom of Jerusalem: an archaeological Gazetter. Cambridge University Press. ISBN 0521-46010-7.
- Rey, E. G. (1871). Etude sur les monuments de l'architecture militaire des croisés en Syrie et dans l'île de Chypre (in French). Paris: L'Imprimerie Nationale.
- Robinson, E.; Smith, E. (1841). Biblical Researches in Palestine, Mount Sinai and Arabia Petraea: A Journal of Travels in the year 1838. Boston: Crocker & Brewster.
  - volume 2
  - volume 3
- Schick, C. (1896). "Zur Einwohnerzahl des Bezirks Jerusalem". Zeitschrift des Deutschen Palästina-Vereins. 19: 120–127.
- Socin, A. (1879). "Alphabetisches Verzeichniss von Ortschaften des Paschalik Jerusalem". Zeitschrift des Deutschen Palästina-Vereins. 2: 135–163.
- Tsafrir, Y. (1994). Tabula Imperii Romanii: Iudaea, Palaestina [Maps and Gazetteer]. Jerusalem: The Israel Academy of Sciences and Humanities. ISBN 9789652081070.
- Wigoder, Geoffrey (2005). The Illustrated Dictionary and Concordance of the Bible. Sterling Publishing Company, Inc. ISBN 9781402728204.
- Wilson, C.W., ed. (c. 1881). Picturesque Palestine, Sinai and Egypt. Vol. 3. New York: D. Appleton.(p.158 -p.161 )
