= Achish =

Biblical character (First Book of Samuel)

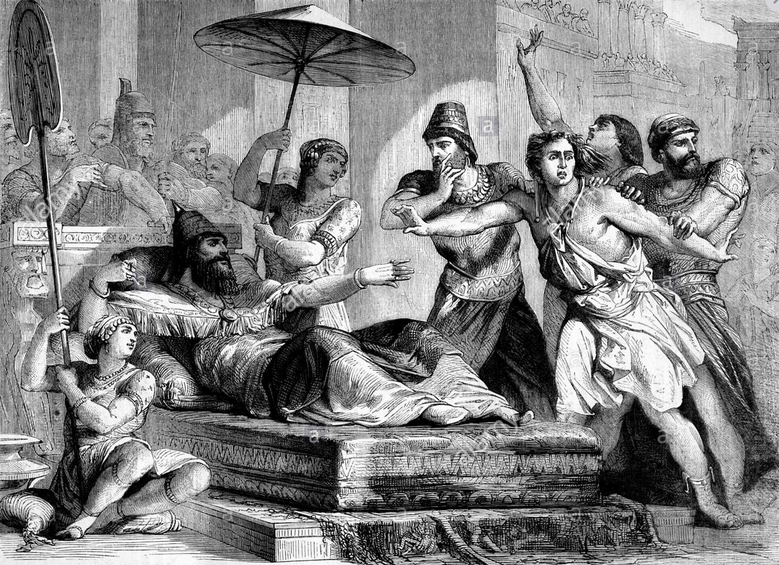
David (right) feigns madness before Achish (lying down), 19th-century illustration

Achish (Hebrew: אָכִישׁ ʾāḵīš, Philistine: 𐤀𐤊𐤉𐤔 *ʾākayūš, Akkadian: 𒄿𒅗𒌑𒋢 i-ka-ú-su) is a name used in the Hebrew Bible for two Philistine rulers of Gath. It is perhaps only a general title of royalty, applicable to the Philistine kings. The two kings of Gath, which most scholars identify as Tell es-Safi, are:

- The monarch, described as "Achish the king of Gath", with whom David sought refuge when he fled from Saul. He is called Abimelech, meaning "father of the king", in the superscription of Psalm 34. It was probably this same king, or his son with the same name, described as "Achish, the son of Maoch", to whom David reappeared a second time at the head of a band of 600 warriors. The king assigned David to Ziklag, whence he carried on war against the surrounding tribes while lying to Achish that he was waging war against Israel to garner his support. Achish had great confidence in the valour and fidelity of David, but, at the objection of the other Philistine rulers, did not permit him to go to battle along with the Philistine hosts. David remained with Achish a year and four months. According to the Bible, in 1 Samuel 21:11–13, David was greatly afraid of Achish because the servants of Achish recognized him. This led him to feign insanity to avoid harm from the King of Gath.
- Another king of Gath, described as "Achish, son of Maacah," probably a grandson of the foregoing king, is referred to during Solomon's reign. I Kings 2:39–46 mentions two servants of Shimei fleeing to this king in Gath, and Shimei going to Gath to bring them back in breach of Solomon's orders. The consequence was that Solomon put Shimei to death.

The Latin transliteration "Achish" represents the begadkefat (aspiration over a medial stop) in Aramaic and in post-Biblical Hebrew. Before the strong influence of Aramaic over Hebrew, which occurred after the Babylonian captivity, אָכִישׁ would have been pronounced: "Akish."

== Ikausu in extrabiblical inscriptions ==
In the seventh-century BCE Ekron Royal Dedicatory Inscription, the name ʾkyš appears on a foundation stone for temple and lists the names of four previous kings of Ekron, he is described as, "son of Padi, son of Ysd, son of ʾAdaʾ, son of Ya‘ir". A similar name, romanized as Ikausu, appears as king of Ekron in two seventh-century BCE Assyrian inscriptions, as does Padi.

Scholars agree that these two are the same men.

This appears to indicate that either the name Akish/Ikausu was a common name for Philistine kings, used both at Gath and Ekron, or, as Naveh has suggested, that the editor of the biblical text used a known name of a Philistine king from the end of the Iron Age (Achish of Ekron) as the name of a king(s) of Gath in narratives relating to earlier periods.

== In media ==
Achish of Gath is a supporting role in the 17th-century opera David et Jonathas, sung by a bass.

Achish king of Gath appears in the 1985 film King David, starring Richard Gere.

Achish appears in the streaming series House of David, played by Iraqi actor Alexander Uloom.

== See also ==
- Akish in the Book of Ether in the Book of Mormon
