= Gath (city) =

Ancient city and archaeological site

Coordinates: 31.700°N 34.847°E

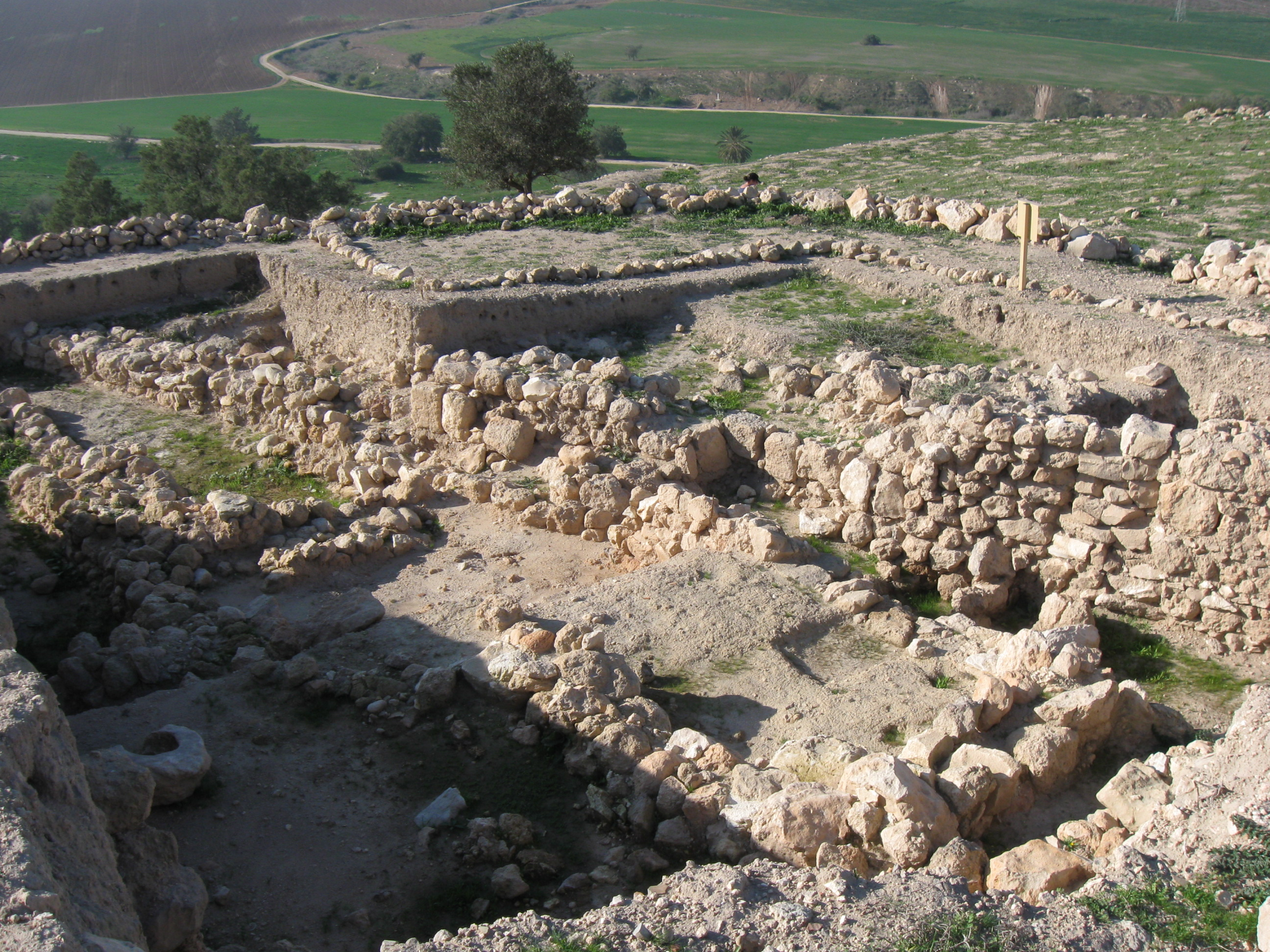
Part of the remains of Tell es-Safi

Gath or Gat (Hebrew: גַּת, romanized: Gaṯ, lit. 'wine press'; Latin: Geth, Philistine: 𐤂𐤕 *Gīt) was one of the five cities of the Philistine pentapolis during the Iron Age. It was located in northeastern Philistia, close to the border with Judah. Gath is often mentioned in the Hebrew Bible and its existence is confirmed by Egyptian inscriptions. Already of significance during the Bronze Age, the city is believed to be mentioned in the El-Amarna letters as Gimti/Gintu, ruled by the two Shuwardata and 'Abdi-Ashtarti. Another Gath, known as Ginti-kirmil (Gath of Carmel) also appears in the Amarna letters.

The site most favored as the location of Gath is the archaeological mound or tell known as Tell es-Safi in Arabic and Tel Zafit in Hebrew (sometimes written Tel Tzafit), located inside Tel Zafit National Park, but a stone inscription disclosing the name of the city has yet to be discovered. A Gittite is a person from Gath.

== Biblical account ==
Gath is mentioned in the Hebrew Bible as one of the five main Philistine cities. It was one of the last refuges of the Anakim in front of the conquering Israelites under Joshua. Gath was either subdued during the days of prophet Samuel, or by King David, although the first book of Kings states that in the time of King Solomon it was still ruled by a Philistine king named Achish. King Achish is mentioned as the ruler of Gath for the times of Saul, David, and Solomon, making it uncertain whether this refers to two or more kings of the same name.

Gath was also the home city of the Philistine giant Goliath and his brothers, as well as of Itai HaGiti, one of King David's generals, and his 600 soldiers who aided the king in his exile from his son Absalom. David, while running from Saul, escaped to Gath, and served under its king Achish. During Solomon's reign, Shemei went to Gath to recover his escaped slave. The city of Gath is also mentioned as being captured by Hazael of Aram Damascus.

The narrative in the first book of Chronicles relates that Ezer and Elead, sons of Ephraim, were killed by men who were natives of Gath, because "they came down to take their livestock".

Gath is named as one of 15 cities fortified by king Rehoboam, son of King Solomon, which were captured by Shishak, king of Egypt.

== Identification ==
A tradition reported by Ishtori Haparchi (1280–1355) and other early Jewish writers is that Ramla was the biblical Gath of the Philistines. Initial archaeological claims seemed to indicate that Ramla was not built on the site of an ancient city, although in recent years the ruins of an old city site were uncovered on the southern outskirts of Ramla. Earlier, Benjamin Mazar had proposed that ancient Gath lay at a site called Ras Abu Hamid east of Ramla. Avi-Yonah, however, considered that to be a different Gath, usually now called Gath-Gittaim. This view is also supported by other scholars, those holding that there was, both, a Gath (today's Tell es-Safi) and Gath-Rimmon (in or near Ramla). Israeli archaeologist, Y. Aharoni, relying upon Eusebius' Onomasticon where he fixes the ancient site of Gath near the Roman road 5 miles (8 km) from Eleutheropolis (Bayt Jibrin) on the way to Diospolis (Lod), suggested to identify the biblical Gath with either Tell ej-Judeideh, or Tel Safi, and that Gath and Moresheth-Gath were the same place.

The 19th-century scholar Edward Robinson proposed that Gath be identified with Tell es-Safi, and this identification was generally accepted until the early 20th century, when it began to be questioned. In the 1920s, famed archaeologist W. F. Albright disputed this identification, writing that "The archaeological exploration of Tell el-Safi did not yield a shred of evidence for the identification with Gath." Albright suggested another site, Tell 'Areini (now close to the city of Kiryat Gat) which, despite some opposition, was accepted to the point that the Israel Government Names Committee renamed it as Tel Gat in 1953. However, excavations at Tell 'Areini starting in 1959 found no Middle Bronze Age traces and the excavators proposed instead that Gath be identified with a third site, Tell en-Nejileh (Tel Nagila), a proposal abandoned after excavations in the 1980s. Attention then returned again to Tell es-Safi, which is thought to be the location of Gath.

In the Madaba map of the 6th century, Tell es-Ṣāfi / Tell el-Ṣāfiyya occurs under the name Saphitha (Greek: ΣΑΦΙΘΑ). The Madaba map identifies a second town, the Philistine Geth (Gath), as being "Gitta, formerly one of the five satrapies [of the Philistines]," a contemporary town South and slightly West of Lydda (Lod) that corresponds with modern Ramla. Others suggest that Gath is none other than "Saphitha" (Tell es-Ṣāfi), but are hard pressed to explain why there are two distinct listings for these sites in the Madaba map, and ascribe an error unto the copyist of the mosaic.

== Tell es-Safi ==
Tell es-Safi and Tel Zafit (Arabic: تل الصافي, Tall aṣ-Ṣāfī; Hebrew: תל צפית, Tel Tzafit) are Arabic and Hebrew names for the ancient mound now widely identified as Gath (variant: "Geth"), one of the five cities in the ancient Philistine Pentapolis (along with Gaza, Ekron, Ashkelon, and Ashdod). It is a large multi-period site that is located in central Israel, approximately halfway between Jerusalem and Ashkelon, on the border between the southern Coastal Plain of Israel and the Judean foothills.

First noted by explorers in the mid-19th century CE, it was subsequently excavated beginning in 1899 for three seasons by the American archaeologist F.J. Bliss and the Irish archaeologist R. A. S. Macalister. Extensive exploration of the site was not conducted until 1996, when a long-term project was commenced at the site, directed by Aren Maeir of Bar-Ilan University, Israel. Since 1996, excavations, surveys and other studies have been conducted at the site, focusing on various cultures, periods and aspects relating to the site, its culture and history, and its surroundings.

=== Chalcolithic ===
The site was inhabited from Proto-Historic through Modern times. The earliest evidence for settlement is from the Chalcolithic Period (c. 5th millennium BCE), after which there is continuous occupation until the modern Palestinian village of Tell es-Safi, abandoned during the 1948 Arab–Israeli War.

=== Bronze Age ===
==== Early Bronze Age ====
During the Early Bronze Age there is evidence of a large urban site, apparently similar to other EB III urban sites in southern Canaan, such as nearby Tel Yarmut (Jarmuth). Scant evidence of this period was found on the tell in the form of stray sherds. In the vicinity of the tell (to the east, in Area C6) evidence of tombs and possible domestic activities were found.

==== Middle Bronze Age ====
Finds from the MB IIB (and a few MB IIA) were found on various parts of the tell in the survey (including a scarab of Khyan, found in the 1960s). Recently, in the 2006 season, evidence of an impressive MB IIB fortification was found in the vicinity of the summit of the tell, comprising a stone wall/tower and a packed earth rampart/glacis.

==== Late Bronze Age ====
The Late Bronze remains at the site are impressive as well, evidence of the Canaanite city of Gath, which is mentioned in the El-Amarna letters. Finds from this period include a large, apparently public building, cultic-related finds, and a small collection of Egyptiaca, including two Egyptian Hieratic inscriptions, both inscribed on locally made vessels. This city was apparently destroyed at the end of the Late Bronze Age, most probably with the arrival of the Philistines.

=== Iron Age ===
==== Iron I ====
During the Iron Age, the site became a major Philistine site, "Gath of the Philistines", one of the five cities of the Philistine "pentapolis", known from biblical and extra-biblical (such as Assyrian) sources. Settled from the earliest phases of the Philistine culture (c. 1200 BCE), evidence of the various stages of the Philistine culture have been found. In particular, finds indicating the gradual transformation of the Philistines, from a non-local (Aegean) culture, to a more locally oriented culture abound. This process, which has been termed "acculturation" or "creolisation" can be seen in various aspects of the Philistine culture, as the Iron Age unfolds.

==== Iron II ====
Of particular importance are the strata dating to the 10th–9th century BCE, in which rich assemblages of finds were uncovered. These strata enable the study of the entire sequence of the Philistine culture, since at other Philistine sites (such as Ekron, Ashdod, and Ashkelon) these phases are not well represented.

Archaeologists believe it was the largest city of the Southern Levant during the 10th and 9th centuries BCE. Recent excavations have uncovered dramatic evidence of a siege and subsequent destruction of the site in the late 9th century BCE, which can be related to the biblical verse that mentions its capture by Hazael of Aram Damascus.

Archaeological excavations have uncovered a Philistine temple and evidence of a major earthquake in biblical times. The excavator Aren Maeir commented on the dating of this geological event,

Based on the tight stratigraphic context, this [earthquake] can be dated to the mid-8th cent. BCE.

A very impressive, site-wide destruction is evidenced at the site during the late Iron Age IIA (c. late 9th century BCE). Throughout the site there is evidence of this destruction, and well-preserved assemblages of finds. The dating of this destruction to the late 9th century BCE is a strong indication that it can be related to the conquest of Gath by Hazael, king of Aram-Damascus, as mentioned in 2 Kings 12:17. Evidence of a large-scale siege system that was found surrounding the site, is apparently related to this event. This siege system, which comprises a man-made siege trench, a related berm (earth embankment) and other elements, is currently the earliest archaeological evidence "on the ground" for an ancient siege system. Although king Uzziah is said to have broken down Gath's walls (2 Chronicles 26:6), this possibly refers to the fact that several sections of the Philistine city wall were used to build the later Judahite buildings.

Among the numerous finds from this destruction level, there is an impressive pottery assemblage, various cultic objects, and a bone tool workshop. The excavators suggested that during Hazael's siege, the city defenders made weapons from animal bones because they were short of raw materials to make metal weapons.

==== Goliath shard ====
In the 2005 season, below the late 9th-century BCE destruction level, in a stratum dating to an earlier phase of the Iron Age IIA, an important inscription was found. Scratched on a shard typical of the Iron Age IIA, two non-Semitic names written in Semitic "Proto-Canaanite" letters were found. These two names, "ALWT" (אלות) and "WLT" (ולת), are etymologically similar to the name Goliath (גלית), the biblical Philistine champion who was a native of Gath.

These two name fragments might indicate that names similar to the name Goliath were in use in Philistia during the Iron Age IIA, approximately the same time as Goliath is described in the Bible. Although not proof of Goliath's existence, the ostracon provides evidence of the cultural milieu of this period. In any case, they provide a useful example of the names used by the Philistines during that time, and the earliest evidence for the use of an alphabetic writing system in the Philistine culture.

=== Crusader period ===
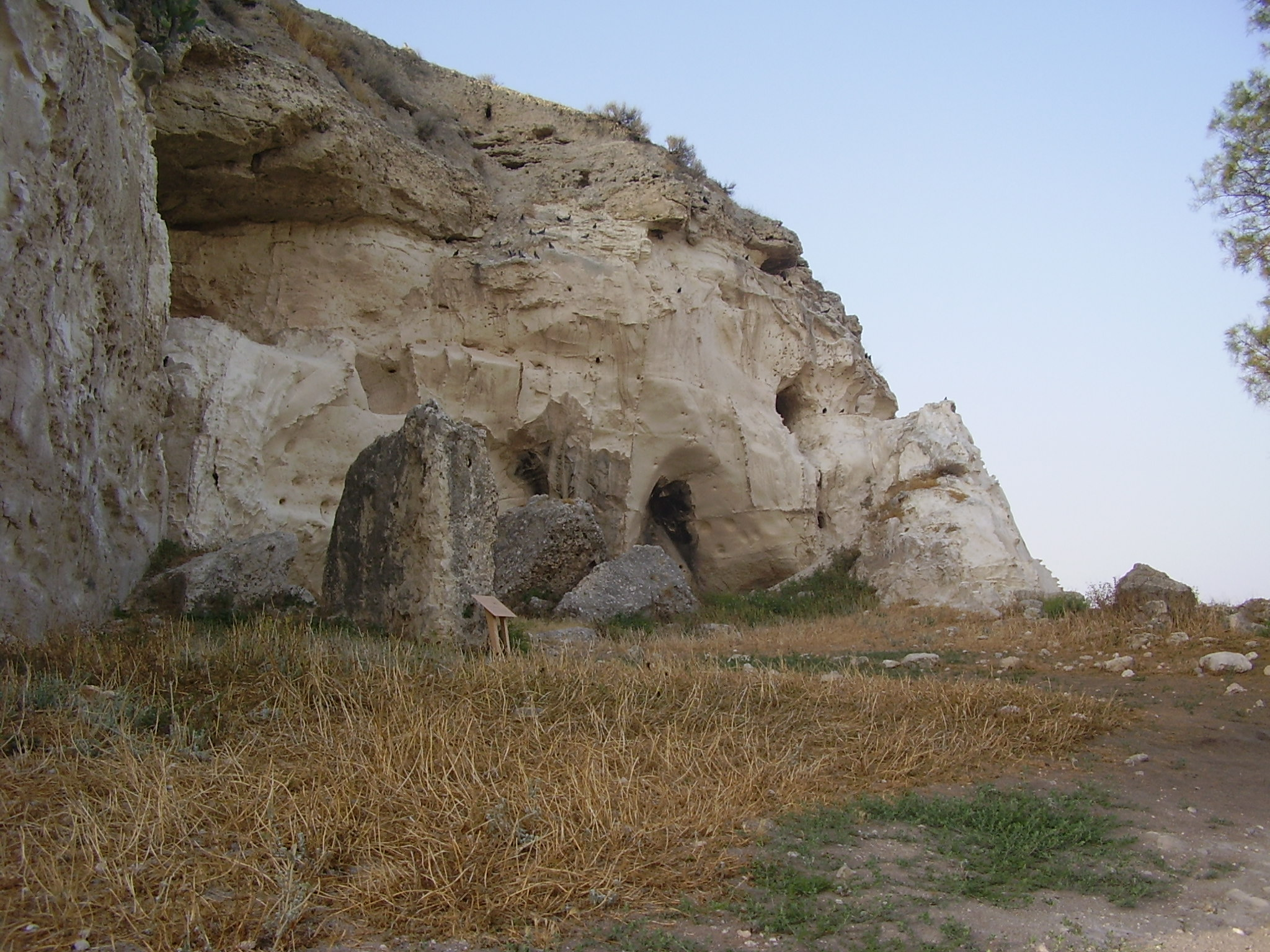
Blanche Garde, Tel Tzafit

Following the destruction of the site by Hazael, Philistine Gath lost its role as a primary Philistine city. Although the site was settled during later periods, it never regained its role as a site of central importance. During the Crusader period, following the conquest of the land during the First Crusade, a small fortress, named Blanche Garde for the dramatic white chalk cliffs that guard its western approach, was built at the site as part of the Crusader encirclement of Fatimid Ashkelon. This site was subsequently captured by the Ayyubids, and served the basis for the medieval and modern village of Tell es-Safi, which existed until 1948. The ruins of the castle and the village can be seen on the site today. Portions of the exterior fortifications of the castle have been excavated in recent years.

== Other Gaths ==
Gath was a common placename in ancient Israel and the surrounding regions. Various cities are mentioned in the Bible with such names as Gath of the Philistines, Gath-Gittaim, and Gath Carmel (Ginti-kirmil). Other sites with similar names appear in various ancient sources, including the Amarna letters.

== Bibliography ==
- Aharoni, Y. (1979). The Land of the Bible: A Historical Geography (2 ed.). Philadelphia: Westminster Press. ISBN 0-664-24266-9. OCLC 6250553. (original Hebrew edition: 'Land of Israel in Biblical Times - Historical Geography', Bialik Institute, Jerusalem (1962))
- Avi-Yonah, M. (2006). "Gath". In Michael Berenbaum (ed.). Encyclopedia Judaica. Vol. 7 (second ed.). ISBN 978-0-02-866097-4.
- Bromiley, Geoffrey W., ed. (1982). The International Standard Bible Encyclopedia. Vol. 2. Grand Rapids, MI: William B. Eerdmans Publishing Company. ISBN 0-8028-3782-4.
- Donner, Herbert [in German] (1992). The Mosaic Map of Madaba: An Introductory Guide. Kampen, NL: Kok Pharos Publishing House. OCLC 234058506.
- Finkelstein, I. (2013). The Forgotten Kingdom: the Archaeology and History of Northern Israel (PDF). Atlanta: Society of Biblical Literature. ISBN 978-1-58983-911-3.
- Harris, Horton (2011). "The location of Ziklag: a review of the candidate sites, based on Biblical, topographical and archaeological evidence". Palestine Exploration Quarterly. 143 (2): 119–33. doi:10.1179/003103211x12971861556954. S2CID 162186999.
- Herrmann, Siegfried (1989). "The So-called 'Fortress System of Rehoboam,' 2 Chron 11:5-12: Theoretical Considerations". Eretz-Israel: Archaeological, Historical and Geographical Studies. 20 (Yigael Yadin Memoril Volume). JSTOR 23621927.
- Ishtori Haparchi (2007). Avraham Yosef Havatzelet (ed.). Sefer Kaftor Ve'ferah (in Hebrew). Vol. 2 (chapter 11) (3rd ed.). Jerusalem.
- Kallai-Kleinmann, Z. (1958). "The Town Lists of Judah, Simeon, Benjamin and Dan". Vetus Testamentum. 8 (2). Leiden: Brill: 134–160. doi:10.2307/1516086. JSTOR 1516086.
- Levin, Yigal (2017). "Gath of the Philistines in the Bible and on the Ground: The Historical Geography of Tell eṣ-Ṣâfi/Gath". Near Eastern Archaeology. 80 (4): 232–240. doi:10.5615/neareastarch.80.4.0232. ISSN 1094-2076.
- Luz, Nimrod (1997). "The Construction of an Islamic City in Palestine. The Case of Umayyad al-Ramla". Journal of the Royal Asiatic Society. Third Series. 7 (1): 27–54. doi:10.1017/S1356186300008300. S2CID 163178178.
- Maeir, A.M.; Wimmer, S.J.; Zukerman, A.; Demsky, A. (2008). "A Late Iron Age I/Early Iron Age II Old Canaanite Inscription from Tell eṣ-Ṣâfī/Gath, Israel: Palaeography, Dating, and Historical-Cultural Significance". Bulletin of the American Schools of Oriental Research. 351 (351): 39–71. doi:10.1086/BASOR25609285. JSTOR 25609285. S2CID 163760582.
- Maeir, A.M., ed. (2012). Tell es-Safi/Gath I: Report on the 1996–2005 Seasons. Ägypten und Altes Testament. Vol. 69. Wiesbaden: Harrassowitz.
- Maeir, A.M. (2020). "Introduction and Overview" (PDF). In Maeir, Aren M.; Uziel, Joe (eds.). Tell Es-Safi/Gath II: Excavations and studies. Ägypten und Altes Testament. Vol. 105. Zaphon. pp. 3–52. ISBN 978-3-96327-128-1.
- Mazar (Maisler), B. (1954). "Gath and Gittaim". Israel Exploration Journal. 4 (3): 227–235. JSTOR 27924579.
- Naʼaman, Nadav (2005). Canaan in the Second Millennium B.C.E. Eisenbrauns. ISBN 978-1-57506-113-9.
- Rainey, A. (1975). "The Identification of Philistine Gath - a Problem in Source Analysis for Historical Geography". Eretz-Israel: Archaeological, Historical and Geographical Studies. Nelson Glueck Memorial Volume: 63–76. JSTOR 23619091.
- Rainey, A. (1998). "Review by: Anson F. Rainey". Journal of the American Oriental Society. 118 (1): 73. JSTOR 606301.
- Tsafrir, Yoram; Di Segni, Leah; Green, Judith (1994). (TIR): Tabula Imperii Romani: Judaea, Palaestina. Jerusalem: Israel Academy of Sciences and Humanities. ISBN 965-208-107-8.
- Vargon, Shmuel (1992). "Gedud: A Place-Name in the Shephelah of Judah". Vetus Testamentum. 42 (4): 557–564. doi:10.2307/1518965. JSTOR 1518965.
