= Anchor Bible Series =

Exegetical lexicon

The Anchor Bible Series, which consists of a commentary series, a Bible dictionary, and a reference library, is a scholarly and commercial co-venture which was begun in 1956, with the publication of individual volumes in the commentary series. Over 1,000 scholars—representing Jewish, Catholic, Eastern Orthodox, Protestant, Muslim, secular, and other traditions—have contributed to the project. Their works offer discussions that reflect a range of viewpoints across a wide theological spectrum.

As of 2008, more than 120 volumes had been published, initially under oversight of the series' founding General Editor David Noel Freedman (1956–2008), and subsequently under John J. Collins (2008–2025). Each volume was originally published by Doubleday (a division of Random House, Inc.), but in 2007, the series was acquired by Yale University Press. Yale now prints all new volumes as the Anchor Yale Bible Series, while continuing to offer all previously published Anchor Bible titles as well. In November 2024 Candida Moss was announced as the new general editor of the series.

== Anchor Bible Commentary Series ==
The Anchor Bible Commentary Series, created under the guidance of William Foxwell Albright (1891–1971), comprises a translation and exegesis of the Hebrew Bible, the New Testament and the Intertestamental Books (the Catholic and Eastern Orthodox Deuterocanon/the Protestant Apocrypha; not the books called by Catholics and Orthodox "Apocrypha", which are widely unused by Protestants). For each biblical book, the series includes an original translation with translational and text-critical notes; overviews of the historical, critical, and literary evolution of the text; an outline of major themes and topics; a verse-by-verse commentary; treatment of competing scholarly theories; historical background; and photographs, illustrations, and maps of artifacts and places associated with biblical figures and sites. Depending on the size and complexity of the book, some are covered in more than one volume.

The series has produced over 100 titles since the release of the first volume in the early 1960s. Despite boasting at least one volume on every book of the Hebrew Bible, New Testament, and Deuterocanon/Apocrypha, the series remains a work in progress. Revisions and replacements of earlier works continue to be released, and at least a half-dozen volumes are currently under contract or in production.

== Anchor Bible Dictionary ==
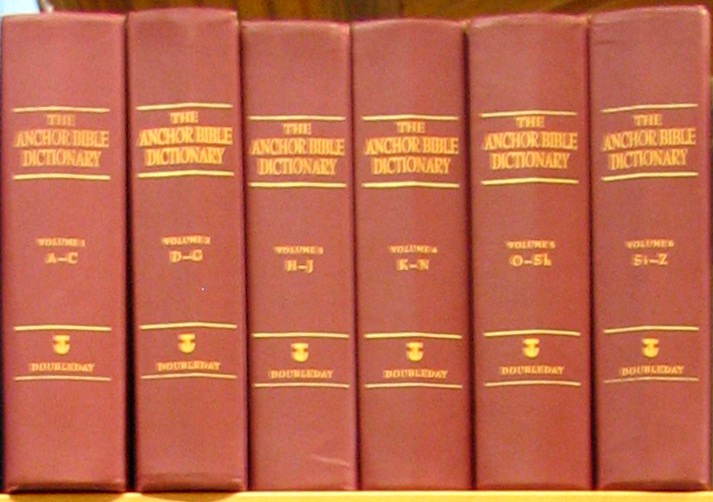
The ABD

The Anchor Bible Dictionary contains more than 6,000 entries from 800 international scholars. It has illustrations and line-art throughout, and is also available for download from Logos Bible Software or Accordance Bible Software. The Dictionary contains a wide array of articles relevant biblical studies such as the Dead Sea Scrolls, early Jewish-Christian relations, the historical Jesus, sociological and literary methods of biblical criticism, feminist hermeneutics, and numerous entries on archaeological sites, as well as bibliographies with citations listed individually at the end of each article.

== Anchor Bible Reference Library ==
The Anchor Bible Reference Library is an open-ended series composed of more than thirty separate volumes with information about anthropology, archaeology, ecology, geography, history, languages, literature, philosophy, religions, and theology, among others.

== Works in the Anchor Yale Bible Commentary series ==
As of 2025, the Anchor Yale Bible Commentary series consists of the following volumes (arranged by their assigned series number, which differs at points from the standard canonical orders):

=== Hebrew Bible / Old Testament ===
- Speiser, E. A. (1964). Genesis. Vol. 1. Yale University Press. ISBN 978-0-3001-4025-5. 454 pages.
- Hendel, Ronald S. (2024). Genesis 1–11. Vol. 1A. Yale University Press. ISBN 9780300149739. 488 pp.
  - In production: ———. Genesis 12–50. Vol. 1B.
- Propp, William H. (1999). Exodus 1–18. Vol. 2. Doubleday. ISBN 978-0-3851-4804-7. 656 pp.
- ——— (2006). Exodus 19–40. Vol. 2A. ISBN 978-0-3001-3939-6. 865 pp.
  - In production: Baden, Joel S. Exodus. (2 vols. expected)
- Milgrom, Jacob (1991). Leviticus 1–16. Vol. 3. Yale University Press. ISBN 978-0-3001-3940-2. 1085 pp.
- ——— (2000). Leviticus 17–22. Vol. 3A. Yale University Press. ISBN 978-0-3001-4056-9. 656 pp.
- ——— (2001). Leviticus 23–27. Vol. 3B. Doubleday. ISBN 978-0-3855-0035-7. 720 pp.
- Levine, Baruch A. (1993). Numbers 1–20. Vol. 4. Yale University Press. ISBN 978-0-3001-4077-4. 544 pp.
- ——— (2000). Numbers 21–36. Vol. 4A. Yale University Press. ISBN 978-0-3001-3942-6. 624 pp.
- Weinfeld, Moshe (1991). Deuteronomy 1–11. Vol. 5. Doubleday. ISBN 978-0-3851-7593-7. 480 pp.
  - In production: Weinfeld, Moshe; Seely, David R. Deuteronomy 12–34. Vol. 5A. (2 vols. expected)
- Dozeman, Thomas B. (2015). Joshua 1–12. Vol. 6B. Yale University Press. ISBN 978-0-3001-4975-3. 600 pp.
- ——— (2023). Joshua 13–24. Vol. 6C. Yale University Press. ISBN 9780300265408. 440 pp.
  - Replaced: Boling, Robert G.; Wright, G. Ernest (1982). Joshua. Vol. 6. Doubleday. ISBN 978-0-3850-0034-5. 608 pp.
- Sasson, Jack M. (2014). Judges 1–12. Vol. 6D. Yale University Press. ISBN 978-0300190335. 592 pp.
- ——— (2025). Judges 13–21. Vol. 6E. ISBN 9780300278132. 480 pp.
  - Replaced: Boling, Robert G. (1974). Judges. Vol. 6A. Doubleday. ISBN 978-0-3850-1029-0. 376 pp.
- Hillers, Delbert R. (1992). Lamentations. Vol. 7A (rev. ed.). ISBN 978-0-3001-3947-1. 175 pp.
  - Replaced: ——— (1972). Lamentations. Vol. 7A. Doubleday. ISBN 978-0-38500738-2. 168 pp.
- Moore, Carey A. (1971). Esther. Vol. 7B. Doubleday. ISBN 978-0-3850-0472-5. 192 pp.
- Pope, Marvin H. (1977). Song of Songs. Vol. 7C. Doubleday. ISBN 978-0-3850-0569-2. 768 pp.
- Schipper, Jeremy (2016). Ruth. Vol. 7D. Yale University Press. ISBN 978-0-3001-9215-5. 240 pp.
  - Replaced: Campbell, Edward F. Jr. (1975). Ruth. Vol. 7. Doubleday. ISBN 978-0-3850-5316-7. 216 pp.
- McCarter, P. Kyle Jr. (1980). 1 Samuel. Vol. 8. ISBN 978-0-3850-6760-7. 504 pp.
- McCarter, P. Kyle Jr. (1984). 2 Samuel. Vol. 9. ISBN 978-0-3850-6808-6. 576 pp.
- Cogan, Mordechai (2001). 1 Kings. Vol. 10. ISBN 978-0-3001-4053-8. 576 pp.
- Cogan, Mordechai; Tadmor, Hayim (1988). 2 Kings. Vol. 11. ISBN 978-0-3001-4074-3. 408 pp.
- Knoppers, Gary N. (2003). 1 Chronicles 1–9. Vol. 12. ISBN 978-0-3001-3952-5. 544 pp.
- Knoppers, Gary N. (2004). 1 Chronicles 10–29. Vol. 12A. ISBN 978-0-3001-3953-2. 608 pp.
  - Replaced: Myers, Jacob M. (1965). 1 Chronicles. Vol. 12. ISBN 978-0-3850-1259-1. 336 pp.
- Myers, Jacob M. (1965). 2 Chronicles. Vol. 13. ISBN 978-0-3850-3757-0. 312 pp.
  - In production: Bautch, Richard J. 2 Chronicles.
- Myers, Jacob M. (1965). Ezra, Nehemiah. Vol. 14. Doubleday. ISBN 978-0-3850-4695-4. 360 pp.
- Eskenazi, Tamara Cohn (2023). Ezra. Vol. 14A. Yale University Press. ISBN 978-0-3001-4969-2. 504 pp.
  - In production: Eskenazi, Tamara Cohn. Nehemiah. Vol. 14B.
- Pope, Marvin H. (1973). Job. Vol. 15. Yale University Press. ISBN 978-0-3001-4075-0. 507 pp. (3rd ed.)
  - Replaced: ——— (1965). Job. Vol. 15. Yale University Press.
- Dahood, Mitchell (1966). Psalms I: 1–50. Vol. 16. Doubleday. ISBN 978-0-3850-2765-6. 384 pp.
- ——— (1968). Psalms II: 51–100. Vol. 17. Doubleday, Incorporated. ISBN 978-0-3850-3759-4. 432 pp.
- ——— (1970). Psalms III: 101–150. Vol. 17A. Doubleday. ISBN 978-0-3850-0607-1. 544 pp.
  - In production: Strawn, Brent A. Psalms. (3 vols. expected)
- Fox, Michael V. (2000). Proverbs 1–9. Vol. 18A. Doubleday. ISBN 978-0-3852-6437-2. 720 pp.
- ——— (2009). Proverbs 10–31. Vol. 18B. Yale University Press. ISBN 978-0-3001-4209-9. 704 pp.
- Seow, Choon-Leong (1997). Ecclesiastes. Vol. 18C. Yale University Press. ISBN 978-0-3001-3960-0. 448 pp.
  - Replaced: Scott, R. B. Y. (1965). Proverbs, Ecclesiastes. Vol. 18. Doubleday. ISBN 978-0-38502177-7. 257 pages.
- Blenkinsopp, Joseph (2000). Isaiah 1–39. Vol. 19. ISBN 978-0-3001-3961-7. 544 pp.
- ——— (2002). Isaiah 40–55. Vol. 19A. Doubleday. ISBN 978-0-3854-9717-6. 432 pp.
- ——— (2003). Isaiah 56–66. Vol. 19B. ISBN 978-0-3001-3962-4. 368 pp.
  - Replaced: McKenzie, John L. (1969). Second Isaiah [34–35, 40–66]. Vol. 20. Yale University Press. ISBN 978-0-3001-4079-8. 304 pp.
- Lundbom, Jack R. (1999). Jeremiah 1–20. Vol. 21A. ISBN 978-0-3001-3963-1. 960 pp.
- ——— (2004). Jeremiah 21–36. Vol. 21B. Doubleday. ISBN 978-0-3001-3964-8. 672 pp.
- ——— (2004). Jeremiah 37–52. Vol. 21C. ISBN 978-0-3001-3965-5. 656 pp.
  - Replaced: Bright, John (1965). Jeremiah. Vol. 21. ISBN 978-0-3850-0823-5. 524 pp.
- Greenberg, Moshe (1983). Ezekiel 1–20. Vol. 22. Doubleday. ISBN 978-0-3850-0954-6. 416 pp.
- ——— (1997). Ezekiel 21–37. Vol. 22A. ISBN 978-0-3001-3967-9. 372 pp.
- Cook, Stephen L. (2018). Ezekiel 38–48. Vol. 22B. Yale University Press. ISBN 978-0-3002-1881-7. 368 pp.
- Hartman, Louis F.; Di Lella, Alexander A. (1978). The Book of Daniel. Vol. 23. Doubleday. ISBN 978-0-3850-1322-2. 360 pp.
- Andersen, Francis I.; Freedman, David Noel (1980). Hosea. Vol. 24. ISBN 978-0-3850-0768-9. 720 pp.
- Eidevall, Göran (2017). Amos. Vol. 24G. Yale University Press. ISBN 978-0-3001-7878-4. 312 pp.
  - Replaced: Andersen, Francis I.; Freedman, David Noel (1989). Amos. Vol. 24A. ISBN 978-0-3001-4070-5. 1024 pp.
- Becking, Bob (2023). Micah. Vol. 24I. Yale University Press. ISBN 978-0-3001-5995-0. 304 pp.
  - Replaced: Andersen, Francis I.; Freedman, David Noel (2000). Micah. Vol. 24E. ISBN 978-0-3850-8402-4. 720 pp.
- Crenshaw, James L. (1995). Joel. Vol. 24C. Yale University Press. ISBN 978-0-3001-4076-7. 272 pp.
- Raabe, Paul (1996). Obadiah. Vol. 24D. ISBN 978-0-3001-3971-6. 336 pp.
- Graybill, Rhiannon; Kaltner, John; McKenzie, Steven L. (2023). Jonah. Vol. 24H. Yale University Press. ISBN 978-0-3002-0667-8. 368 pp.
  - Replaced: Sasson, Jack M. (1990). Jonah. Vol. 24B. Doubleday. ISBN 978-0-3852-3525-9. 384 pp.
- Christensen, Duane L. (2009). Nahum. Vol. 24F. Yale University Press. ISBN 978-0-3001-4479-6. 464 pp.
- Andersen, Francis I. (2001). Habakkuk. Vol. 25. ISBN 978-0-3001-3973-0. 416 pp.
- Berlin, Adele (1994). Zephaniah. Vol. 25A. Yale University Press. ISBN 978-0-3001-4080-4. 192 pp.
- Meyers, Carol L.; Meyers, Eric M. (1987). Haggai, Zechariah 1–8. Vol. 25B. Doubleday. ISBN 978-0-3851-4482-7. 576 pp.
- Meyers, Carol L.; Meyers, Eric M. (1992). Zechariah 9–14. Vol. 25C. ISBN 978-0-3001-3976-1. 864 pp.
- Hill, Andrew E. (1998). Malachi. Vol. 25D. ISBN 978-0-3854-6892-3. 480 pp.

=== New Testament ===
- Albright, W. F.; Mann, C. S. (1971). Matthew. Vol. 26. ISBN 978-0-3850-8658-5. 576 pp.
- Marcus, Joel (2002). Mark 1–8. Vol. 27. ISBN 978-0-3854-2349-6. 592 pp.
  - Replaced: Mann, C. S. (1986). Mark. Vol. 27. ISBN 978-0-3850-3253-7. 744 pp.
- Marcus, Joel (2009). Mark 8–16. Vol. 27A. ISBN 978-0-3001-4116-0. 672 pp.
- Fitzmyer, Joseph A. (1970). The Gospel according to Luke 1–9. Vol. 28. ISBN 978-0-38500515-9. 864 pp.
- ——— (1985). The Gospel according to Luke 10–24. Vol. 28A. ISBN 978-0-38515542-7. 848 pp.
- Brown, Raymond E. (1966). The Gospel according to John 1–12. Vol. 29. ISBN 978-0385015172. 544 pp.
- ——— (1970). The Gospel according to John 13–21. Vol. 29A. ISBN 978-0-30014072-9. 688 pp.
- ——— (1982). The Epistles of John. Vol. 30. ISBN 978-0-3850-5686-1. 840 pp.
- Fitzmyer, Joseph A. (1998). The Acts of the Apostles. Vol. 31. Doubleday. ISBN 978-0-3854-6880-0. 824 pp.
  - Replaced: Munck, Johannes (1967). The Acts of the Apostles. Vol. 31. Doubleday. ISBN 978-0-3850-0914-0. 468 pp.
- Fitzmyer, Joseph A. (2008). First Corinthians. Vol. 32. ISBN 978-0-3001-4044-6. 688 pp.
  - Replaced: Orr, William F.; Walther, James Arthur (1976). 1 Corinthians. Vol. 32. Doubleday. ISBN 978-0-3850-2853-0. 408 pp.
- Furnish, Victor P. (1984). 2 Corinthians. Vol. 32A. Doubleday. ISBN 978-0-3851-1199-7. 648 pp.
- Malherbe, Abraham J. (2000). The Letters to the Thessalonians. Vol. 32B. Doubleday. ISBN 978-0-3851-8460-1. 640 pp.
- Fitzmyer, Joseph A. (1993). Romans. Vol. 33. Yale University Press. ISBN 978-0-3001-4078-1. 832 pp.
- Martyn, J. Louis (1997). Galatians. Vol. 33A. Doubleday. ISBN 978-0-3850-8838-1. 608 pp.
- Reumann, John (2008). Philippians. Vol. 33B. Yale University Press. ISBN 978-0-3001-4045-3. 832 pp.
- Barth, Markus (1974). Ephesians 1–3. Vol. 34. ISBN 978-0-3001-4071-2. 464 pp.
- ——— (1974). Ephesians 4–6. Vol. 34A. Doubleday. ISBN 978-0-3850-8037-8. 849 pp.
- Barth, Markus; Blanke, Helmut (1994). Colossians. Vol. 34B. Translated by Beck, Astrid Billes. ISBN 978-0-3851-1068-6. 552 pp.
- Fitzmyer, Joseph A. (2000). The Letter to Philemon. Vol. 34C. ISBN 978-0-3001-4055-2. 138 pp.
- Quinn, Jerome D. (1990). The Letter to Titus. Vol. 35. ISBN 978-0-3001-4026-2. 384 pp.
- Johnson, Luke Timothy (2001). The First and Second Letters to Timothy. Vol. 35A. ISBN 978-0-3001-3988-4. 512 pp.
- Koester, Craig R. (2001). Hebrews. Vol. 36. ISBN 978-0-3854-6893-0. 640 pp.
  - Replaced: Buchanan, George Wesley (1972). To the Hebrews. Vol. 36. ISBN 978-0-3850-2995-7. 312 pp.
- Johnson, Luke Timothy (1995). The Letter of James. Vol. 37A. ISBN 978-0-3854-1360-2. 608 pp.
- Elliott, John H. (2000). 1 Peter. Vol. 37B. ISBN 978-0-3854-1363-3. 1200 pp.
- Neyrey, Jerome H. (1993). 2 Peter and Jude. Vol. 37C. ISBN 978-0-3854-1362-6. 300 pp.
  - Replaced: Reicke, Bo (1964). The Epistles of James, Peter, and Jude. Vol. 37. ISBN 978-0-3850-1374-1. 264 pp.
- Koester, Craig R. (2014). Revelation. Vol. 38A. ISBN 978-0-3001-4488-8. 928 pp.
  - Replaced: Ford, J. Massyngberde (1975). Revelation. Vol. 38. ISBN 978-0-3850-0895-2. 528 pp.

=== Apocrypha / Deuterocanon ===
- Skehan, Patrick W.; DiLella, Alexander A. (1987). The Wisdom of Ben Sira. Vol. 39. ISBN 978-0-3851-3517-7. 624 pp.
- Moore, Carey A. (1985). Judith. Vol. 40. ISBN 978-0-3851-4424-7. 288 pp.
- Moore, Carey A. (1996). Tobit. Vol. 40A. ISBN 978-0-3001-3996-9. 368 pp.
- Schwartz, Daniel R. (2022). 1 Maccabees. Vol. 41B. Yale University Press. ISBN 978-0-3001-5993-6. 496 pp.
  - Replaced: Goldstein, Jonathan A. (1976). I Maccabees. Vol. 41. ISBN 978-0-3850-8533-5. 592 pp.
- Goldstein, Jonathan A. (1983). II Maccabees. Vol. 41A. ISBN 978-0-3850-4864-4. 592 pp.
- Myers, Jacob M. (1974). I and II Esdras. Vol. 42. Doubleday. ISBN 978-0-3850-0426-8. 352 pp.
- Winston, David (1979). The Wisdom of Solomon. Vol. 43. Yale University Press. ISBN 978-0-3001-3999-0. 360 pp.
- Moore, Carey A. (1977). Daniel, Esther, and Jeremiah: The Additions. Vol. 44. Doubleday. ISBN 978-0-3850-4702-9. 384 pp.

=== Noncanonical ===
- Brakke, David (2022). The Gospel of Judas. Vol. 45. Yale University Press. ISBN 978-0-3001-7326-0. 278 pp.

== Works in the Anchor Yale Bible Reference Library ==
Works in the Anchor Yale Bible Reference Library include:

- Ackerman, Susan (1998). Warrior, Dancer, Seductress, Queen: Women in Judges and Biblical Israel. Doubleday. ISBN 0-385-48424-0.
- ——— (2022). Women and the Religion of Ancient Israel. ISBN 978-0-300-14178-8.
- Adler, Yonatan (2022). The Origins of Judaism: An Archaeological-Historical Reappraisal. ISBN 978-0-300-27665-7.
- Baden, Joel S. (2012). The Composition of the Pentateuch: Renewing the Documentary Hypothesis. Yale University Press. ISBN 978-0-300-15263-0.
- Becker, Eve-Marie (2017). The Birth of Christian History: Memory and Time from Mark to Luke-Acts. Yale University Press. ISBN 978-0-300-16537-1.
- Blenkinsopp, Joseph (2000). Pentateuch: An Introduction to the First Five Books of the Bible. Doubleday. ISBN 0-385-49788-1.
- Brown, Raymond E. (1994). Death of the Messiah: From Gethsemane to the Grave (2 Vol. Boxed Set). Doubleday. ISBN 0-385-47177-7.
- ——— (1997). An Introduction to the New Testament. ISBN 0-385-24767-2.
- ———; Soards, Marion L. (2016). An Introduction to the New Testament (abridged ed.). ISBN 978-0-300-17312-3.
- ——— (1999). Birth of the Messiah: A Commentary on the Infancy Narratives in the Gospels of Matthew and Luke (2nd ed.). ISBN 0-385-49447-5.
- ——— (2003). An Introduction to the Gospel of John. Doubleday. ISBN 0-385-50722-4.
- Chapman, Cynthia R. (2016). The House of the Mother: The Social Roles of Maternal Kin in Biblical Hebrew Narrative and Poetry. Yale University Press. ISBN 978-0-300-224801.
- Charlesworth, James H. (1983). The Old Testament Pseudepigrapha. Vol. . 1: Apocalyptic Literature and Testaments. Doubleday. ISBN 0-385-09630-5.
- ——— (1985). The Old Testament Pseudepigrapha. Vol. 2: Expansions of the "Old Testament" and Legends, Wisdom and Philosophical Literature, Prayers, Psalms and Odes, Fragments of Lost Judeo-Hellenistic Works. Doubleday. ISBN 0-385-18813-7.
- ——— (1988). Jesus Within Judaism. Doubleday. ISBN 0-385-23610-7.
- ——— (1992). Jesus and the Dead Sea Scrolls. Doubleday. ISBN 0-385-24863-6.
- ——— (2006). The Good and Evil Serpent: The Symbolism and Meaning of the Serpent in the Ancient World. Doubleday Religious Publishing. ISBN 0-385-49696-6.
- Collins, Adela Yarbro (2022). Paul Transformed: Reception of the Person and Letters of Paul in Antiquity. Yale University Press. ISBN 978-0-300-19442-5.
- Collins, John J. (1995). Scepter and the Star: The Messiahs of the Dead Sea Scrolls and Other Ancient Literature. Doubleday. ISBN 0-385-47457-1.
- Crenshaw, James L. (1998). Education in Ancient Israel: Across the Deadening Silence. Doubleday. ISBN 0-385-46891-1.
- Dinkler, Michal Beth (2019). Literary Theory and the New Testament. ISBN 978-0-30021991-3.
- Dungan, David Laird (1999). A History of the Synoptic Problem: The Canon, the Text, the Composition, and the Interpretation of the Gospels. ISBN 0-385-47192-0.
- Freedman, David Noel (2000). The Nine Commandments: Uncovering the Hidden Pattern of Crime and Punishment in the Hebrew Bible. ISBN 0-385-49986-8.
- Garrett, Susan R. (2008). No Ordinary Angel: Celestial Spirits and Christian Claims about Jesus. ISBN 978-0-300-14095-8.
- Goldstein, Jonathan A. (2002). Peoples of an Almighty God: Competing Religions in the Ancient World. ISBN 0-385-42347-0.
- Hahn, Scott W. (2009). Kinship by Covenant: A Canonical Approach to the Fulfillment of God's Saving Promises. ISBN 978-0-300-14097-2.
- Hamori, Esther J. (2015). Women's Divination in Biblical Literature: Prophecy, Necromancy, and Other Arts of Knowledge. ISBN 978-0-300-17891-3.
- Hendel, Ronald; Joosten, Jan (2018). How Old Is the Hebrew Bible?: A Linguistic, Textual, and Historical Study. ISBN 978-0-30023488-6.
- Henning, Meghan R. (2021). Hell Hath No Fury: Gender; Disability; and the Invention of Damned Bodies in Early Christian Literature. ISBN 978-0-300-22311-8.
- Jackson-McCabe, Matt (2020). Jewish Christianity: The Making of the Christianity-Judaism Divide. ISBN 978-0-300-18013-8.
- Johnson, Luke Timothy (2010). Among the Gentiles: Greco-Roman Religion and Christianity. ISBN 978-0-300-16810-5.
- Kampen, John (2019). Matthew within Sectarian Judaism. ISBN 978-0-30017156-3.
- Layton, Bentley (1995). The Gnostic Scriptures: A New Translation with Annotations and Introductions. Doubleday. ISBN 0-385-47843-7.
- ———; Brakke, David (2021). The Gnostic Scriptures (2nd ed.). Yale University Press. ISBN 978-0-300-20854-2.
- Lim, Timothy H. (2013). The Formation of the Jewish Canon. Yale University Press. ISBN 978-0-300-16434-3.
- Mazar, Amihai (1990). Archaeology of the Land of the Bible. Vol. 1: 10, 000–586 B.C.E. Doubleday. ISBN 0-385-23970-X.
- Meier, John P. (1991). A Marginal Jew: Rethinking the Historical Jesus: Volume 1: The Roots of the Problem and the Person. Yale University Press. ISBN 0-385-26425-9.
- ——— (1994). A Marginal Jew: Rethinking the Historical Jesus. Vol. 2: Mentor, Message, and Miracles. Doubleday. ISBN 0-385-46992-6.
- ——— (2001). A Marginal Jew: Rethinking the Historical Jesus. Vol. 3: Companions and Competitors. Doubleday. ISBN 0-385-46993-4.
- ——— (2009). A Marginal Jew: Rethinking the Historical Jesus. Vol. 4: Law and Love. Doubleday. ISBN 978-0-300-14096-5.
- ——— (2016). A Marginal Jew: Rethinking the Historical Jesus. Vol. 5: Probing the Authenticity of the Parables. Yale University Press. ISBN 978-0-300-21190-0.
- Meyers, Eric M.; Chancey, Mark A. (2012). Archaeology of the Land of the Bible: Volume 3: Alexander to Constantine. Yale University Press. ISBN 978-0-300-14179-5.
- Mobley, Gregory (2005). The Empty Men: the Heroic Tradition of Ancient Israel. ISBN 0-385-49851-9.
- Moss, Candida R. (2012). Ancient Christian Martyrdom: Diverse Practices, Theologies, and Traditions. ISBN 978-0-300-15465-8.
- Neusner, Jacob (1994). Introduction to Rabbinic Literature. ISBN 0-385-47093-2.
- Newsom, Carol A. (2021). The Spirit within Me: Self and Agency in Ancient Israel and Second Temple Judaism. ISBN 978-0-300-20868-9.
- Niditch, Susan (2015). The Responsive Self: Personal Religion in Biblical Literature of the Neo-Babylonian and Persian Periods. ISBN 978-0-300-16636-1.
- Niehoff, Maren (2018). Philo of Alexandria: An Intellectual Biography. ISBN 978-0-30017523-3.
- Olyan, Saul M. (2017). Friendship in the Hebrew Bible. ISBN 978-0-300-18422-8.
- Peckham, Brian (1993). History and Prophecy: The Development of Late Judean Literary Traditions. ISBN 0-385-42348-9.
- Regev, Eyal (2019). The Temple in Early Christianity: Experiencing the Sacred. ISBN 978-0-30019788-4.
- Schiffman, Lawrence H. (1995). Reclaiming the Dead Sea Scrolls: The History of Judaism, the Background of Christianity, the Lost Library of Qumran. ISBN 0-8276-0530-7.
- Schniedewind, William M. (2013). A Social History of Hebrew: Its Origins Through the Rabbinic Period. ISBN 978-0-300-17668-1.
- Segal, Alan F. (2004). Life after Death: A History of the Afterlife in Western Religion. ISBN 0-385-42299-7.
- Smith, Mark S. (2016). Where the Gods Are: Spatial Dimensions of Anthropomorphism in the Biblical World. ISBN 978-0-300-20922-8.
- Sommer, Benjamin D. (2015). Revelation and Authority: Sinai in Jewish Scripture and Tradition. ISBN 978-0-300-15873-1.
- Stackert, Jeffrey (2022). Deuteronomy and the Pentateuch. ISBN 978-0-300-16751-1.
- Stern, Ephraim (2001). Archaeology of the Land of the Bible: Volume 2: The Assyrian, Babylonian, and Persian Periods (732–332 BCE). ISBN 0-385-42450-7.
- van der Toorn, Karel (2019). Becoming Diaspora Jews: Behind the Story of Elephantine. Yale University Press. ISBN 978-0-300-24351-2.
- ——— (2025). Israelite Religion: From Tribal Beginnings to Scribal Legacy. Yale University Press. ISBN 978-0-300-28162-0.
- Wasserman, Emma (2018). Apocalypse as Holy War: Divine Politics and Polemics in the Letters of Paul. Yale University Press. ISBN 978-0-30020402-5.
- Wise, Michael Owen (2015). Language and Literacy in Roman Judaea: A Study of the Bar Kokhba Documents. Yale University Press. ISBN 978-0-300-20453-7.

== See also ==
- List of Biblical commentaries
