= Gary N. Knoppers =

American academic (1956–2018)

Gerald "Gary" Neil Knoppers (November 14, 1956 – December 22, 2018) was a professor in the Department of Theology at University of Notre Dame. He wrote books and articles regarding a range of Old Testament and ancient Near Eastern topics. He is particularly renowned for his work on 1 Chronicles, writing I Chronicles 1 – 9 (Anchor Bible Volume 12) and I Chronicles 10 – 29 (Anchor Bible Volume 12A), which together comprise a significant treatment of the work of the Chronicler. In May 2005 the Canadian Society of Biblical Studies granted the R. B. Y. Scott Award to Knoppers for his two-volume Anchor Bible commentary on I Chronicles.

== Early life and education ==
Knoppers was born in Edmonton, Alberta, Canada. His parents were Barthie Maria Boon Knoppers and Nicolaas Bastiaan Knoppers. Knoppers' upbringing was in the Dutch Reformed tradition.

Knoppers studied at Calvin College from 1975 to 1979, where he majored in philosophy, obtaining a B.A. cum laude. He then moved on to Gordon-Conwell Theological Seminary where he studied Old Testament from 1979 to 1982, graduating M.Div. Harvard University was next, and there Knoppers obtained an M.A. with distinction in Near Eastern Languages and Civilizations. His Harvard studies were from 1982 to 1986. Knoppers obtained his Ph.D. at Harvard University in 1988. His doctoral dissertation at Harvard was entitled "What Share Have We in David?": The Division of the Kingdom in Kings and Chronicles. Frank Moore Cross, Jr. directed his Ph.D.

== Career ==
Knoppers first taught at Andover Newton Theological School for a term in spring 1986.

In the fall of 1987 he began his career at Pennsylvania State University as an instructor in Religious Studies, and then was Assistant Professor in Religious Studies from 1988 to 1994. In 1994 he became Associate Professor of Classics and Ancient Mediterranean Studies, Religious Studies and Jewish Studies. From 2002 to 2014 he was Professor in the Department of Classics and Ancient Mediterranean Studies, where was the Edwin Erle Sparks Professor of Classics and Ancient Mediterranean Studies, Religious Studies, and Jewish Studies. Knoppers also served as the head of that department from 1996 to 2006.

His scholarly concentrations are: Ancient Israelite and Near Eastern History; Ancient Historiography; Biblical Theology; The Books of Kings and Chronicles; Comparative Ancient Near Eastern Religions; Inner Biblical Exegesis; and Northwest Semitic Epigraphy.

In the fall of 2014 he left Penn State to take up an endowed professorship in Biblical Studies in the Department of Theology at the University of Notre Dame.

As of 2007, Knoppers had served on the following theological boards and committees:

- Steering Committee, Chronicles-Ezra-Nehemiah Section, Society of Biblical Literature
- Steering Committee, First Esdras Consultation of the Society of Biblical Literature
- Steering Committee, Hebrew Bible, History and Archaeology Section, Society of Biblical Literature
- Steering Committee, Literature of the Persian Period Group, Society of Biblical Literature
- Editorial Board, Vetus Testamentum
- Editorial Board, Internationaler Exegetischer Kommentar zum Alten Testament (IEKAT) / International Exegetical Commentary on the Old Testament (IECOT)
- Board of Trustees, W. F. Albright Institute of Archaeological Research, American Schools of Oriental Research, Jerusalem

Knoppers died of pancreatic cancer, and was survived by his wife Laura Knoppers, the George N. Shuster Professor of English Literature in Notre Dame’s Department of English, and their two children, Theresa and David.

== Books ==
- The Reign of Solomon and the Rise of Jeroboam which is Vol. 1 of Two Nations under God: The Deuteronomistic History of Solomon and the Dual Monarchies (Harvard Semitic Monographs No. 52) (Atlanta: Scholars Press, 1993), 302 pages.
- The Reign of Jeroboam, the Fall of Israel, and the Reign of Josiah which is Vol. 2 of Two Nations under God: The Deuteronomistic History of Solomon and the Dual Monarchies (Harvard Semitic Monographs No. 53) (Atlanta: Scholars Press, 1994), 349 pages.
- Reconsidering Israel and Judah: The Deuteronomistic History in Recent Thought written by the team of Gary N. Knoppers and J. Gordon McConville Sources for Biblical and Theological Study, vol. 8 (Winona Lake, Indiana: Eisenbrauns, 2000), 650 pages.
- The Chronicler as Theologian: Festschrift, Ralph W. Klein Edited by M. Patrick Graham, Gary N. Knoppers and S. L. McKenzie, JSOT Supplement No. 371 (London: T. & T. Clark Continuum, 2003), 288 pages.
- I Chronicles 1 – 9 (Anchor Bible Volume 12) (New York: Doubleday, 2003), 514 pages.
- I Chronicles 10 – 29 (Anchor Bible Volume 12A) (New York: Doubleday, 2004), 531 pages [the two Anchor volumes combine to a total of 1045 pages, the page nos. continue from the first vol. into the second vol].
- Jews and Samaritans: The Origins and History of Their Early Relations (Oxford University Press, 2013), 326 pages.

== Articles and shorter pieces ==
- "'What Share Have We in David?': The Division of the Kingdom in Kings and Chronicles", Ph.D. dissertation, Harvard University (1988).
- "A Reunited Kingdom in Chronicles?" Proceedings, Eastern Great Lakes and Midwest Biblical Societies 9 (Buffalo:Eastern Great Lakes Biblical Society, 1989): pp. 74–88.
- "Rehoboam in Chronicles: Villain or Victim?" Journal of Biblical Literature Vol. 109 (Decatur:SBL, 1990), pages 423–440.
- "Unfinished Business" The Reformed Journal 40 (Holland, Michigan:Reformed Church Press, pages 20–23.
- "Reform and Regression: The Chronicler's Presentation of Jehoshaphat" Biblica Vol. 72(Rome:Pontifical Biblical Institute, 1991), pages 500–524.
- "'The God in His Temple': The Phoenician Text from Pyrgi as a Funerary Inscription" Journal of Near Eastern Studies Vol. 51 (Chicago:University of Chicago Press, 1992), pages 105–120.
- "'There Was None Like Him': Incomparability in the Books of Kings" Catholic Biblical Quarterly Vol. 54 (Washington DC:Catholic Biblical Association of America, 1992), pages 411–431.
- "'Battling against Yahweh': Israel's War against Judah in 2 Chr 13:2–20" Revue biblique Vol. 100 (Jerusalem: Ecole Biblique et Archeologique Francaise, 1993), pages 511–532.
- Articles on Asher, the Deuteronomist, Dan, Gad, Israel, Issachar, Jehoshaphat, Levi, Naphtali, Reuben, Showbread, and Zebulun compiled for the Oxford Companion to the Bible, Edited by Bruce Metzger and M. Coogan (New York: Oxford University Press, 1993).
- "Treaty, Tribute List, or Diplomatic Letter?: KTU 3.1 Re-examined" Bulletin of the American Schools of Oriental Research 289 (Boston:ASOR, 1993), pages 81–94.
- "Dissonance and Disaster in the Legend of Kirta" Journal of the American Oriental Society Vol. 114 (Ann Arbor: AOS, 1994), pages 572–582.
- "Jehoshaphat's Judiciary and the Scroll of YHWH's Torah" Journal of Biblical Literature Vol. 113 (Decatur:SBL, 1994), pages 59–80.
- Review of Kim Strubind's Tradition als Interpretation in der Chronik: Konig Josaphat als Paradigma chronistischer Hermeneutik und theologie; the review appeared in Catholic Biblical Quarterly Vol. 55 (Washington DC:Catholic Biblical Association of America,1994), pages 780–782.
- "Sex, Religion, and Politics: The Deuteronomist on Intermarriage" Hebrew Annual Review 14 (Columbus, Ohio:Ohio State University, 1994), pages 121–141.
- "Aaron's Calf and Jeroboam's Calves" in Fortunate the Eyes That See: Essays in Honor of David Noel Freedman in Celebration of His Seventieth Birthday Edited by Astrid B. Beck, et al. (Grand Rapids: Eerdmans, 1995), pages 92–104.
- "Images of David in Early Judaism: David as Repentant Sinner in Chronicles" Biblica Vol. 76 (Rome:Pontifical Biblical Institute, 1995), pages 449–470.
- "Prayer and Propaganda: The Dedication of Solomon's Temple and the Deuteronomist's Program" Catholic Biblical Quarterly Vol. 57 (Washington DC:Catholic Biblical Association of America, 1995), pages 229–254; this was later reprinted in the volume Reconsidering Israel and Judah: Recent Studies on the Deuteronomistic History [Editors: Gary N. Knoppers and J. Gordon McConville] Sources for Biblical and Theology Study No. 8 (Winona Lake, Indiana:Eisenbrauns, 2000) pages 370–396.
- Review of A. Graeme Auld's book Kings without Privilege; the review appeared in Ashland Theological Journal 27 (Ashland, Ohio:Ashland Theological Seminary, 1995), pages 118–121.
- "Ancient Near Eastern Royal Grants and the Davidic Covenant: A Parallel?" Journal of the American Oriental Society Vol. 116 (Ann Arbor, Michigan:American Oriental Society, 1996), pp. 670–697.
- "The Deuteronomist and the Deuteronomic Law of the King: A Re-examination of a Relationship" Zeitschrift fur die alttestamentliche Wissenschaft (commonly known as ZATW) Band (vol.)108 (Berlin:Walter de Gruyter 1996), pages 329–346.
- "'Yhwh Is Not with Israel': Alliances as a Topos in Chronicles" Catholic Biblical Quarterly Vol. 58 (Washington DC: Catholic Biblical Assoc of America, 1996), pages 601–626.
- "History and Historiography: The Royal Reforms" appeared in the book The Chronicler as Historian, Edited M. Patrick Graham, Gary N. Knoppers and S. L. McKenzie [JSOT Supplement No. 238] (Sheffield: JSOT Press, 1997), pages 178–203; this was reprinted in the volume Israel's Past in Recent Research Edited by V. Philips Long [Sources for Biblical and Theological Study No. 7] (Winona Lake, Indiana:Eisenbrauns, 1999), pages 557–578.
- "The Vanishing Solomon: The Disappearance of the United Monarchy from Recent Histories of Ancient Israel" Journal of Biblical Literature Vol. 116 (Decatur, Georgia:SBL, 1997), pages 19–44.
- "Solomon's Fall and Deuteronomy" which appeared in the volume The Age of Solomon: Scholarship at the Turn of the Millennium (Studies in the History of the Ancient Near East [SHANE] No. 11), Edited by Lowell K. Handy (Leiden:Brill Publishers, 1997), pages 392–410.
- David's Relation to Moses: The Context, Content, and Conditions of the Davidic Promises" which appeared in the book King and Messiah in Israel and the Ancient Near East: Papers from the Oxford Old Testament Seminar, Editor J. Day, JSOT Supplement No. 270 (Sheffield:JSOT Press, 1998, pages 91–118.
- "Hierodules, Priests, or Janitors? The Levites in Chronicles and the History of the Israelite Priesthood" Journal of Biblical Literature Vol. 118 (Decatur: SBL, 1999), pages 49–72.
- "The History of the Monarchy: Developments and Detours" which appeared in the volume The Face of Old Testament Studies, Edited by D. W. Baker and B. T. Arnold (Grand Rapids: Baker, 1999), pages 207–235.
- "Jerusalem at War in Chronicles" which was published in the larger volume Zion, City of Our God, Edited by R. S. Hess and G. J. Wenham (Grand Rapids: Eerdmans, 1999), pages 57–76.
- Book Review of Josette Elayi and Jean Sapin's volume Beyond the River: New Perspectives on Transeuphratene; the review appeared in Journal of Biblical Literature Vol. 118 (Decatur:SBL, 1999), pages 712–714.
- "Treasures Won and Lost: Royal (Mis)appropriations in Kings and Chronicles" in the volume The Chronicler as Author: Studies in Text and Texture Edited by M. Patrick Graham and S. L. McKenzie, JSOTSupplement No. 263 (Sheffield: Sheffield Academic Press, 1999), pages 181–208.
- "'Great among His Brothers,' But Who Is He? Heterogeneity in the Composition of Judah" Journal of Hebrew Scriptures 3, 4 (Online: https://www.purl.org/jhs, 2000).
- "The Preferential Status of the Eldest Son Revoked?" appeared in the book Rethinking the Foundations: Historiography in the Ancient World and in the Bible, Essays in Honour of John Van Seters, Editor/writers Steven Linn McKenzie and Thomas Romer, Behiefte zur Zeitschrift fur die alttestamentliche Wissenschaft (known as BZAW) Supplement 294 (Berlin: Walter de Gruyter, pages 115–126.
- "Sources, Revisions, and Editions: The Lists of Jerusalem's Residents in MT and LXX Nehemiah 11 and 1 Chronicles 9", Textus Vol. 20 (Jerusalem:Hebrew University Bible Project, 2000), pages 141–168.
- "An Achaemenid Imperial Authorization of Torah in Yehud?" which appeared in Persia and Torah: The Theory of Imperial Authorization of the Pentateuch, Edited by J. W. Watts, Society of Biblical Literature Symposium Series (Atlanta:SBL Press, 2001), pages 115–134.
- "The Davidic Genealogy: Some Contextual Considerations from the Ancient Mediterranean World", Transeuphratene No. 22 (Paris:Gabalda, 2001), pages 35–50.
- "Intermarriage, Social Complexity, and Ethnic Diversity in the Genealogy of Judah", Journal of Biblical Literature Vol. 120(Decatur:SBL, 2001), pages 15–30.
- "Rethinking the Relationship between Deuteronomy and the Deuteronomistic History: The Case of Kings", Catholic Biblical Quarterly Vol. 63 (Washington DC:Catholic Biblical Association of America, 2001), pages 393–415.
- "The Relationship of the Priestly Genealogies to the History of the High Priesthood in Jerusalem" which appeared in the book Judah and the Judeans in the Neo-Babylonian Period Edited by Oded Lipschits and Joseph Blenkinsopp (Winona Lake, Indiana:Eisenbrauns, 2003).
