= The Early History of God =

Book by Mark S. Smith

The Early History of God: Yahweh and Other Deities in Ancient Israel
- Title page for The Early History of God: Yahweh and Other Deities in Ancient Israel (1990)
- Author: Mark S. Smith
- Language: English
- Publication date: 1990
- ISBN: 0-8028-3972-X

The Early History of God: Yahweh and Other Deities in Ancient Israel is a book on the history of ancient Israelite religion by Mark S. Smith, Skirball Professor of Bible and Ancient Near Eastern Studies at New York University. The revised 2002 edition contains revisions to the original 1990 edition in light of intervening archaeological finds and studies.

The history of the emergence of Judaism and monotheism has been the subject of study since at least the 19th century and Julius Wellhausen's Prolegomena to the History of Israel; in the 20th century a work was William F. Albright's Yahweh and the Gods of Canaan (1968), which insisted on the essential otherness of Yahweh from the Canaanite gods from the very beginning of Israel's history. Smith and others believe that Israel and its religion emerged gradually from a West Semitic and Canaanite background.

== Summary ==
Smith says that Israelite culture was largely Canaanite in origin, and that deities such as El, Baal and Asherah, far from being alien to the Israelites, formed part of their heritage. He therefore sees Israelite monolatry (the insistence that Israel should worship one god, Yahweh, but without denying the reality of other gods) as a break with Israel's own past.

Yahweh, he argues, originated in Edom/Midian/Teman as a warrior-god and was subsequently assimilated into the highland pantheon headed by El and his consort, Asherah, and populated by Baal and other deities.

Smith sees this process as marked by two major phases, which he describes as "convergence" and "differentiation". In the period of the Judges and the early monarchy, convergence saw the coalescence of the qualities of other deities, and even the deities themselves, into Yahweh. Thus El became identified as a name of Yahweh, Asherah ceased to be a distinct goddess, and qualities of El, Asherah and Baal (notably, for Baal, his identification as a storm god) were assimilated into Yahweh. In the period from the 9th century BC through to the Babylonian exile certain features of the Israelite religion were differentiated from the Yahweh cult, identified as Canaanite, and rejected: examples include Baal, child sacrifice, the asherah poles, worship of the sun and moon, and the cults of the "high places".

== See also ==
- Canaanite religion
