= Peter Kyle (disambiguation) =

Peter Kyle (born 1970) is a British politician.

Peter Kyle may also refer to:

- Peter Kyle McCarter Jr. (born 1945), Old Testament scholar
- Peter Kyle (footballer) (1878–1957), Scottish footballer
