= Texts of Terror =

- Author: Phyllis Trible
- Language: English
- Series: Overtures to Biblical Theology
- Subject: Biblical studies, feminist theology
- Publisher: Fortress Press
- Publication date: 1984
- Publication place: United States
- Pages: 128

Texts of Terror: Literary-Feminist Readings of Biblical Narratives is a 1984 feminist book by the American biblical scholar Phyllis Trible, published by Fortress Press as volume 13 of the Overtures to Biblical Theology series. The book gives literary and feminist readings of four biblical narratives in which women are victims of violence. Trible calls her task telling sad stories, and writes that the narratives yield four portraits of suffering in ancient Israel.

The book has remained a standard point of reference in feminist biblical criticism. John L. Thompson calls it a landmark among those studying women of the Bible. Rhiannon Graybill opens her 2021 monograph Texts After Terror by stating that feminist approaches to rape and sexual violence in the Hebrew Bible remain dominated by Trible's book.

== Background ==
The studies in the book were the substance of Trible's Beecher Lectures at Yale, a lecture series concerned with preaching in the church. Walter Brueggemann, who wrote the editor's foreword, notes that Trible's perspective on preaching is implicit in the book and shown by example rather than by direct comment. Chapter 4 had appeared earlier in expanded form as an article in the Union Seminary Quarterly Review in 1981.

Trible had published God and the Rhetoric of Sexuality in the same series in 1978. Brueggemann writes that by the time of Texts of Terror she had become established as an effective practitioner of rhetorical criticism and as a decisive voice in feminist exposition of biblical literature.

== Method ==
Trible writes from a feminist perspective and uses literary criticism as her methodology. She defines the perspective in a sentence that is often quoted in later scholarship: "As a critique of culture and faith in light of misogyny, feminism is a prophetic movement." Her own approach, she writes, recounts tales of terror in memoriam to offer sympathetic readings of abused women, and it interprets stories of outrage on behalf of their female victims. Trible warns readers against seeking their redemption of the narratives in the resurrection: "Sad stories do not have happy endings."

== Contents ==
=== Hagar ===
The first chapter, "Hagar: The Desolation of Rejection", reads Genesis 16 and Genesis 21. Hagar is an Egyptian slave who is used and abused by Sarah and Abraham, and she is then rejected and sent into the wilderness with her son Ishmael. Barbara Thiede and Johanna Stiebert note that Hagar is oppressed as an enslaved Egyptian woman in a story centred on Sarah and Abraham.

=== Tamar ===
The second chapter, "Tamar: The Royal Rape of Wisdom", reads 2 Samuel 13. Tamar is a princess and the daughter of David, and she is raped by her brother Amnon and then discarded. Trible acknowledges that readers are wounded by such violent texts, and Thiede and Stiebert note that she still argues for seeking a blessing in the reading.

=== An unnamed woman ===
The third chapter, "An Unnamed Woman: The Extravagance of Violence", reads Judges 19. The woman is the concubine of a Levite, and in Trible's summary she is raped, and her body is dismembered after her death. Thiede and Stiebert describe the narrative as the gang rape of the Levite's wife.

=== The daughter of Jephthah ===
The fourth chapter, "The Daughter of Jephthah: An Inhuman Sacrifice", reads Judges 11. Jephthah makes a vow, and his unnamed daughter is slain and sacrificed in fulfilment of it. The chapters move, in Trible's own ordering, from rejection to rape and then to dismemberment and sacrifice.

== Reception ==
The book was reviewed on publication in several scholarly journals. James G. Williams, writing in Theology Today, questioned Trible's claim that knowledge of these women survived only from "the oppressor's perspective", and concluded: "Trible makes a moving appeal to read and listen from a different standpoint, but she does not accomplish the hermeneutical task". Jon D. Levenson reviewed the book in The Journal of Religion in 1985. Dianne Bergant reviewed it in Horizons in 1985. Irene Nowell reviewed it in the Biblical Theology Bulletin in 1986, and Claudia V. Camp reviewed it in the Journal of the American Academy of Religion the same year. Ben C. Ollenburger, writing in the Journal of Biblical Literature, criticised Trible's translations for going farther than the texts warrant and questioned her frequent allusions to the passion of Christ, but concluded: "These critical remarks aside, Trible has written an eloquent and provocative book". Pamela J. Milne reviewed it in Studies in Religion in 1987.

Thompson's Writing the Wrongs (2001) is built around the four narratives Trible treated, together with the story of Lot's daughters. Thompson argues that the common claim that these stories passed without comment until recent times is mistaken, because premodern commentators from Philo through the Reformation addressed them regularly.

== Legacy ==
Rhiannon Graybill's Texts After Terror (2021) takes its title and its starting point from Trible's book. Graybill describes feminist criticism in Trible's practice as telling sad stories, and she proposes further feminist strategies that push beyond that framework. A second tribute volume appeared in the same year, the essay collection Terror in the Bible edited by Monica Jyotsna Melanchthon and Robyn J. Whitaker.

Writing forty years after the book appeared, Thiede and Stiebert call it a pivotal book that provided a clarion call for change. They argue that the field of feminist commentary on biblical sexual violence remains vibrant and diverse, and that reading with empathy remains a critical part of the feminist project.

Fortress Press issued a 40th Anniversary Edition of the book in 2022, with a foreword by Gale A. Yee. The edition keeps the four chapters of the original and adds an "In Memoriam" section.

== See also ==
- Feminist theology
- Women in the Bible
