= Mark S. Smith =

American biblical scholar (born 1956)

- Born: December 6, 1955 (age 70); Paris, France
- Occupations: biblical scholar, professor
- Board member of: Chairperson, Catholic Biblical Quarterly Monograph Series
- Spouse: Elizabeth M. Bloch-Smith
- Children: 3

Academic background
- Education: Johns Hopkins University, Catholic University of America, Harvard Divinity School
- Alma mater: Yale University (Ph.D.)
- Thesis: Kothar wa-Hasis, the Ugaritic Craftsman God (1985)
- Doctoral advisor: Marvin H. Pope

Academic work
- Discipline: Ancient Near Eastern languages, Religions of the Ancient Near East, Old Testament Literature
- Institutions: New York University, Princeton Theological Seminary

Mark Stratton John Matthew Smith (born December 6, 1956) is an American Old Testament scholar and professor.

== Early life and education ==
Born in Paris to Donald Eugene Smith and Mary Elizabeth (Betty) Reichert, Smith grew up in Washington, D.C., with his six sisters and two brothers. For elementary school, he attended Blessed Sacrament School. For grades 7–12, he went to St. Anselm's Abbey School.

Smith began his university studies at Johns Hopkins University receiving his B.A. in English in 1976. He received his Masters in theology at Catholic University of America in 1978. He received a Masters of Theological Studies, concentrating in biblical studies, at Harvard Divinity School, in 1981.

At Harvard, Smith studied with Frank Moore Cross, Thomas Lambdin, William Moran, and Michael D. Coogan. Primarily studying West Semitic languages and literatures, including the Hebrew Bible, Smith took an M.A. (1982), M.Phil. (1983), and Ph.D. (1985) in the Department of Near Eastern Languages and Literatures at Yale University. His advisor and director of his dissertation on Kothar-wa-Khasis, the Ugaritic craftsman god, was Marvin H. Pope, author of works on Ugaritic and biblical religion, including two commentaries in the Anchor Bible series on the Song of Songs and Job. At Yale, Smith also studied with Franz Rosenthal, Brevard Childs, Robert R. Wilson, and W. W. Hallo. While writing his dissertation, he studied at the Hebrew University for a year (1984–1985) under Jonas C. Greenfield.

== Career ==
After graduate school, Smith focused on the history of Israelite and ancient Near Eastern religion. He also began to explore the representation of deities and divinity in the Hebrew Bible and the ancient Near East from the Bronze Age to the Greco-Roman period. For several summers in the late 1980s and early 1990s, he also studied Dead Sea Scrolls with John Strugnell at the Ecole Biblique. This work issued in the publications of four manuscripts of the Dead Sea Scrolls.

Smith was the chair of Bible and Ancient Near Eastern Studies in the Department of Hebrew and Judaic Studies at New York University, and then came to be professor of Old Testament Literature and Exegesis at Princeton Theological Seminary.

Smith made many contributions to the study of the Hebrew Bible and Northwest Semitic texts as well as Ugaritic literature and religion. Among his most notable publications are The Early History of God, The Origins of Biblical Monotheism, and his translation of the Baal Cycle (The Ugaritic Baal Cycle, Vols. 1–2).

== Personal life ==
Smith has been married since 1983 to the archaeologist Elizabeth M. Bloch-Smith, author of Judahite Burials and Beliefs about the Dead. They have three children named Benjamin, Rachel, and Shulamit. Smith is a Roman Catholic.

== Fellowships and honors ==
- Golden Dozen Award for Excellence in Undergraduate Teaching, New York University, 2007
- Frank Moore Cross Publications Award, American Schools of Oriental Research, 2005
- Golden Dozen Award for Excellence in Undergraduate Teaching, New York University, 2001
- Fellow, Center for Judaic Studies, University of Pennsylvania, 1998
- Faculty Merit Award for Research, Saint Joseph's University, 1995
- Morse Fellow, Yale University, 1993
- Dorot Dead Sea Scrolls Fellow (summer), W. F. Albright Institute of Archeological Research, 1990
- Mellon Faculty Fellowship Leave (spring term), Yale University 1989
- Recipient of the Mitchell Dahood Memorial Prize 1988, 1990
- Post-doctoral fellow W. F. Albright Institute of Archeological Research, 1988
- Annual Professor, W. F. Albright Institute of Archeological Research, 1987
- Mary Cady Tew prize for best first-year graduate student, Yale University, 1982

== Additional positions ==
- Member, Catholic Biblical Association of America, Society of Biblical Literature, Colloquium for Biblical Research, Old Testament Colloquium, and Association for Jewish Studies
- Chairperson, Catholic Biblical Quarterly Monograph Series
- Co-editor, Forschungen zum Alten Testament Series, published by Mohr Siebeck

== Publications ==
Books

- Psalms: The Divine Journey. New York, NY; Mahwah, NJ: Paulist Press. 1987. ISBN 978-0-8091-2897-6.
- The Early History of God: Yahweh and the Other Deities in Ancient Israel. San Francisco, CA; New York: Harper & Row. 1990. ISBN 978-0-0606-7416-8.
- The Laments of Jeremiah and Their Context: A Literarv and Redactional Study of Jeremiah 11–20. Society of Biblical Literature Monograph Series. Vol. 42. Atlanta, GA: Scholars. 1990. ISBN 978-1-5554-0461-1.
- The Origins and Development of the Waw-Consecutive: Northwest Semitic Evidence from Ugarit to Qumran. Harvard Semitic Studies Series. Vol. 39. Atlanta, GA: Scholars Press. 1991. ISBN 978-1-5750-6935-7.
- The Ugaritic Baal Cycle: Volume 1. Introduction with Text, Translation and Commentary of KTU 1.1–1.2. Vetus Testamentum Supplements series. Vol. 55. Leiden, South Holland: Brill. 1994. ISBN 978-9-0041-5348-6.
- Smith, Mark S. (1997). The Pilgrimage Pattern in Exodus. Journal for the Society of Old Testament Supplement Series. Vol. 239. contributions by Elizabeth M. Bloch-Smith. Sheffield: Sheffield Academic Press. ISBN 978-1-8507-5652-1.
- The Origins of Biblical Monotheism: Israel's Polytheistic Background and the Ugaritic Texts. New York, NY; Oxford, England: Oxford University Press. 2000. ISBN 978-0-1951-6768-9.
- Untold Stories: The Bible and Ugaritic Studies in the Twentieth Century. Peabody, MA: Hendrickson Publishers. 2001. ISBN 978-1-5656-3575-3.
- The Memoirs of God: History, Memory, and the Experience of the Divine. Minneapolis, MN: Fortress Press. 2004. ISBN 978-0-8006-3485-8.
- The Rituals and Myths of the Feast of the Goodly Gods of KTU/CAT 1.23: Royal Constructions of Opposition, Intersection, Integration, and Domination. Atlanta, GA: Society of Biblical Literature. 2006. ISBN 978-1-5898-3203-9.
- God in Translation: Deities in Cross-cultural Discourse in the Biblical World. Tuebingen: Mohr Siebeck. 2008. ISBN 978-3-1614-9543-4.
- Smith, Mark S., ed. (2009). The Ugaritic Baal Cycle: Volume 2. Introduction with Text, Translation and Commentary of KTU 1.3–1.4. Vetus Testament Supplement series. Vol. 114. Leiden, South Holland: Brill. ISBN 978-9-0040-9995-1.
- Exodus. The New Collegeville Bible Commentary. Vol. 3. Collegeville, MN: The Liturgical Press. 2009. ISBN 978-0-8146-2837-9.
- Michael D. Coogan, ed. (2009). Stories From Ancient Canaan (Second revised and expanded ed.). Louisville, KY: Westminster, John Knox Press. ISBN 978-0-6642-3242-9.
- How Human Is God?: Seven Questions about God and Humanity in the Bible. Collegeville, MN: The Liturgical Press. 2014. ISBN 978-0-8146-3759-3.
- Where the Gods Are: Spatial Dimensions of Anthropomorphism in the Biblical World. Anchor Yale Bible Reference Library. Yale University Press. 2016. ISBN 978-0-300-20922-8.
- The Genesis of Good and Evil: The Fall(out) and Original Sin in the Bible. Westminster John Knox Press. 2019. ISBN 978-0664263959.
