= The Bible and Critical Theory =

- Discipline: Biblical studies
- Language: English
- Edited by: Robert Seesengood, Rhiannon Graybill

Publication details
- History: 2004–present
- Frequency: Biannually
- Open access: Yes
- License: Creative Commons Attribution 4.0

Standard abbreviations
- ISO 4: Bible Crit. Theory

Indexing
- ISSN: 1832-3391
- OCLC no.: 76789239

Links
- Journal homepage

The Bible and Critical Theory is a biannual peer-reviewed open access academic journal in the fields of biblical studies and critical theory. It was established by Roland Boer in 2004, and was published by Monash University ePress until 2010. Since 2011 it has been published independently. Julie Kelso was the editor-in-chief from 2008 to 2011, and then she co-edited with Boer from 2012 to 2015. From 2016 to 2020, Caroline Blyth and Robert J. Myles were editors-in-chief.

== Abstracting and indexing ==
The journal is abstracted and indexed in the ATLA Religion Database and Scopus.
