= Jacob M. Myers =

Jacob Martin Myers
- Born: October 25, 1904; West Manchester, Pennsylvania, US
- Died: September 15, 1991 (aged 86)
- Occupations: Biblical academic and commentator
- Title: West Pennsylvania Synod professor of Hebrew and Old Testament language, literature and theology
- Spouse: Mary Helen (nee Kimmel)
- Children: 1

Academic background
- Education: Gettysburg Seminary, Temple University
- Alma mater: Johns Hopkins University (Ph.D.)
- Thesis: in "Semantics" (1946)
- Influences: W. F. Albright

Academic work
- Discipline: Biblical studies
- Sub-discipline: Old Testament studies
- Institutions: Lutheran Theological Seminary at Gettysburg, Pennsylvania
- Notable works: 2 Chronicles (AYB)

Jacob Martin Myers (October 25, 1904 – September 15, 1991) was a Bible commentator and senior lecturer in the department of Hebrew and Old Testament at the Lutheran Theological Seminary at Gettysburg, Pennsylvania. In 1930 he was ordained a pastor by the West Pennsylvania Synod of the United Lutheran Church in America.

Myers was born on October 25, 1904, in West Manchester, Pennsylvania, to Harvey A. Myers and his wife Annie (née Seiffert).

His academic education started at Gettysburg Seminary followed by the Temple University in Philadelphia. His PhD work was done at Johns Hopkins University in Semitics and completed in 1946. Whilst at Johns Hopkins he came under the profound influence of Professor W. F. Albright.

== Selected works ==
=== Books ===
- 1 Chronicles. Anchor Yale Bible. Vol. 12. 1965. ISBN 978-0-3850-1259-1.
- 2 Chronicles. Anchor Yale Bible. Vol. 13. Yale University Press. 1965. ISBN 978-0-3850-3757-0.
- Ezra - Nehemiah. Anchor Yale Bible. Vol. 14. Yale University Press. 1965. ISBN 978-0-3850-4695-4.
- 1 and 2 Esdras. Anchor Yale Bible. Vol. 42. Yale University Press. 1974. ISBN 978-0-3850-0426-8.
- The World of the Restoration. Englewood Cliffs, NJ: Prentice-Hall. 1968. ISBN 978-0-1396-8214-8.
- Bream, Howard N.; et al., eds. (1974). A Light Into My path; Old Testament studies in honor of Jacob M. Myers. Gettysburg Theological Studies IV. Philadelphia, PA: Temple University Press. ISBN 978-0-87722-026-8.
- Invitation to the Old Testament: a Layman's Guide to Its Major Religious Messages. Doubleday. 1966.
- Grace and Torah. Philadelphia, PA: Fortress Press. 1975. ISBN 978-0-8006-1099-9.
- Bream, Howard N.; et al., eds. (1969). Search the Scriptures: New Testament studies in honor of Raymond T. Stamm. Leiden: Brill.
- The Layman's Bible Commentary: The Book of Hosea, the Book of Joel, the Book of Amos, the Book of Obadiah, the Book of Jonah. Westminster John Knox Press. 1960. ISBN 978-0-8042-3074-2.
- The Linguistic and Literary Form of the Book of Ruth. Leiden: Brill. 1955.

=== Articles & chapters ===
- "Ezra and Nehemiah". Encyclopedia Biblica.
