= Views of the Biblical World =

Set of 1959 reference books about the Bible

Views of the Biblical World (Library of Congress Catalogue Number 59-7767) is a five-volume set of reference books published in 1959 by the International Publishing Company J-M, of Israel. Also published under the name World of the Bible, the series was acclaimed at the time as a landmark. It was the first publication dedicated exclusively to the correlation of archaeological and historical discoveries in Palestine with biblical texts.

The volumes included contributions from biblical scholars and archaeologists including Benjamin Mazar, William Albright, Yigael Yadin and Michael Avi-Yonah. The books' Editorial Manager was biblical historian Prof. Ory Mazar.

== Landmark publication ==
"Views of the Biblical World... was the first reference book series to take each chapter, and in some cases even each verse, of the biblical narrative and publish a detailed commentary on the geographical, historical and archaeological discoveries in the Bible Lands related to those passages," says Jerusalem historian Michael Leon. "The last volume, number 5, was dedicated exclusively to discoveries related to the New Testament."

According to a commentary by Ivan Caine, the book series included, "pictures and text [which are even today] invaluable for personal enrichment and... for teachers and preachers in college or clerical classes." Indeed, some fifty years after its release, the series is still found in most major libraries, Universities and Bible schools.

Martin Buber wrote that the book series was the first to show, "a comprehensive view of the countries and civilizations amid which the people of the Bible lived and developed." Israel's president, Yitzhak Ben-Zvi wrote that the volumes, "provide students of the Bible throughout the world with a clear picture, based on the most recent scientific conclusions, of the physical, ethnic and historical surroundings in which... the biblical stories [took place]."

== Updated edition ==
Jerusalem historian Dan Mazar has been named by the publishers as the head of the editorial board for the book's reprint. Mazar has authored numerous works on Christian-Israel relations and Second Temple archaeology and is a former chairman of the political action group, the Christian Mid-East Conference. He is the third generation in his family to be involved in this book series: his grandfather Benjamin Mazar was the original chairman of the editorial board of Views of the Biblical World in 1959, and his father Ory was the Editorial Manager of the publication.
