= Francis Andersen =

Australian linguist (1925–2020)

- Born: Francis Ian Andersen; 28 July 1925; Warwick, Queensland, Australia
- Died: 13 May 2020 (aged 94); Melbourne, Australia
- Occupation: Professor of Studies in Religion
- Spouses: Lois Garrett, Margaret Johnson
- Children: 5

Academic background
- Education: University of Queensland
- Alma mater: University of Melbourne (PhD)

Academic work
- Discipline: Biblical studies
- Sub-discipline: OT studies
- Institutions: Macquarie University; University of Queensland; Fuller Theological Seminary
- Main interests: Biblical studies, Hebrew, Archaeology
- Notable works: Job: an introduction and commentary
- Notable ideas: Computer-assisted corpus linguistics

Francis Ian Andersen (28 July 1925 – 13 May 2020) was an Australian scholar in the fields of biblical studies and Hebrew. Together with A. Dean Forbes (full name Alfred Dean Forbes, born 1941), he pioneered the use of computers for the analysis of biblical Hebrew syntax. He taught Old Testament, History, and Religious Studies at various institutions in Australia and the United States, including Macquarie University, the University of Queensland, and Fuller Theological Seminary. His published works include the Tyndale commentary on Job, and Anchor Bible commentaries on Hosea, Amos, Habakkuk and Micah, and over 90 papers (some as co-author).

== Biography ==
Francis Ian Andersen was born in Warwick, Queensland, Australia. In his final high school examinations in 1942, he topped the state of Queensland, winning an Open Scholarship to the University of Queensland. He received a Bachelor of Science from the University of Queensland in Chemistry in 1947. He accepted a position as Demonstrator in Chemistry at the University of Melbourne, where he taught until 1953. He received a Master of Science in Physical Chemistry in 1951, and a Bachelor of Arts in Russian in 1955, both from the University of Melbourne.

In 1952 he married Lois Garrett, a medical doctor. They had five children: John (born 1954), David (born 1956), Martin (born 1958), Nedra (born 1961), and Kathryn (born 1965).

While he was undertaking a postgraduate degree in chemistry at the University of Melbourne, he was attracted into the field of biblical studies by Stuart Barton Babbage, the principal of Ridley College, an Anglican theological college in Melbourne, who persuaded him to join the staff there. In 1957 he received a Fulbright Scholarship to study at Johns Hopkins University in Baltimore, United States under William F. Albright. He received a PhD with a dissertation entitled "Studies in Hebrew Syntax".

In 1960 he returned to Ridley College as Vice-Principal. In 1963 he accepted an appointment as Professor of Old Testament at the Church Divinity School of the Pacific, in Berkeley, California. In 1973 he became Warden of the College of Saint John the Evangelist in Auckland, New Zealand. A year later, he returned to Australia. From 1974 to 1975 he was Exchange Professor at the Department of Near Eastern Studies at the University of Michigan in Ann Arbor, Michigan. In 1975 he became Associate Professor of History at Macquarie University, in North Ryde, New South Wales, where he taught until 1980. In 1981 he became Professor of Studies in Religion at the University of Queensland, in St Lucia, Queensland.

In 1988 he returned to the United States, where he taught at New College for Advanced Christian Studies, in Berkeley California until 1993. He subsequently became David Allan Hubbard Professor of Old Testament at Fuller Theological Seminary, in Pasadena, California from 1994 to 1997. He later lived in Melbourne, Australia.

His wife Lois died in 2010. In 2015 he married Margaret Johnson nee Beazley. He died on 13 May 2020 at the age of 94.

== Work ==
Andersen had a wide range of research interests, and has been described as a polymath. As can be seen from his bibliography, he published research in such diverse fields as archaeology, biblical studies, chemistry, computational linguistics, Hebrew orthography, morphology, and syntax, pseudepigrapha, Semitic languages, sociology, and theology.

Much of his most significant work was the result of two academic partnerships he formed when he was teaching at the Church Divinity School of the Pacific in Berkeley, California in the 1960s. The first was with David Noel Freedman, who was teaching at the San Francisco Theological Seminary. They teamed up commencing in 1965 to write three commentaries on the minor prophets in the Anchor Bible series, which was edited by Freedman. Andersen wrote a fourth commentary on Habakkuk by himself.

The other research partnership was with A. Dean Forbes, who was Project Manager for Computer Speech Recognition Research at Hewlett-Packard Laboratories in Palo Alto, California. Over a period of more than thirty-five years, Andersen and Forbes carried out research in the field of computer-assisted corpus linguistics, developing a computer database of all the clauses in the Hebrew Bible. During the initial period of research from 1971 to 1979, Andersen transcribed the entire text of the Leningrad Codex of the Hebrew Bible into machine readable form. The orthographic words were then segmented into grammatical segments. A linguistic dictionary was generated by the computer, which included grammatical information on each segment.

This database enabled Andersen and Forbes to produce a series of computer generated keyword-in-context concordances, as well as analyses of the vocabulary of the Old Testament (see bibliography on computational linguistics). Their database has been licensed to Logos Bible Software and provided with a syntax search engine.

Another area of Andersen’s work arose out of his study of Russian. He became an authority on the book of 2 Enoch, a book of the Pseudepigrapha preserved in the Old Church Slavonic language (see bibliography on Pseudepigrapha). He made a number of trips to the Soviet Union, including a visit in January 1989 under an exchange agreement between the University of Queensland and the USSR Academy of Sciences. He spent much time examining ancient manuscripts in various libraries in Leningrad (now Saint Petersburg), including the Russian National Library (Saltykor-Shchedrin), the Library of the Oriental Institute, and the Library of the Academy of Sciences. He was able to shed light on a number of important manuscripts hitherto little accessed by Western scholars. One of these was the Karasu-Bazar Codex(Codex by Krymchaks) of the Latter Prophets, which may be the oldest extant biblical codex in Hebrew. Another was manuscript A, representing the shorter recension of 2 Enoch, the very existence of which had previously escaped the attention of Western scholars. He also made a visit to Bulgaria in 1986 and published an article on Pseudepigrapha studies there.

== Partial bibliography ==
- For a more comprehensive bibliography up to 1985, see Newing, Edward G.; Conrad, Edgar W., eds. (1987), Perspectives on Language and Text: Essays and Poems in Honor of Francis I. Andersen's Sixtieth Birthday, July 28, 1985, Winona Lake, IN: Eisenbrauns, pp. 439–443, ISBN 0-931464-26-9
- For a current bibliography of works on computational linguistics, see Andersen-Forbes Resources

=== Archaeology ===
- Andersen (1970), "The Archaeology of the Bible", Holman Study Bible, Philadelphia: Holman, pp. 84–90
- Andersen (1974), "Pella of the Decapolis", Buried History, vol. 10, pp. 109–119
- Andersen (1977), "Ebla: The More We Find Out, the Less We Know", Buried History, vol. 13, pp. 6–12
- Andersen (1999), "The Dedicatory Philistine Inscription from Eqron", Buried History, vol. 35, no. 1, pp. 7–21
- Andersen (1999), "New Solutions to Old Problems [Moussaieff Ostracon (No. 79)]", Buried History, vol. 35, no. 4, pp. 27–34

=== Biblical studies ===
- Andersen (1958), "The Dead Sea Scrolls and the Formation of the Canon", Bulletin of the Evangelical Theological Society, vol. 1, pp. 1–7
- Andersen (1961–62), "The Diet of John the Baptist", Abr-Nahrain, vol. 3, pp. 60–74
- Andersen, Francis I. (1966), "The Socio-juridical Background of the Naboth Incident", Journal of Biblical Literature, vol. 85, no. 1, The Society of Biblical Literature, pp. 46–57, doi:10.2307/3264356, JSTOR 3264356
- Andersen (1976), Job: An Introduction and Commentary, Tyndale Old Testament Commentaries, vol. 13, Downers Grove, IL: InterVarsity Press
- Andersen, Francis; Freedman, David Noel (1980), Hosea: A New Translation With Introduction and Commentary, Anchor Bible, vol. 24, New York: Doubleday
- Andersen (1983), "On Reading Genesis 1–3", Interchange, vol. 33, pp. 11–36
- Andersen, Francis; Freedman, David Noel (1989), Amos: A New Translation With Introduction and Commentary, Anchor Bible, vol. 24A, New York: Doubleday (This commentary is, according to Tremper Longman, "one of the best on any biblical book.")
- Andersen (1994), "The Poetic Properties of Prophetic Discourse in the Book of Micah", in Bergen, Robert D. (ed.), Biblical Hebrew and Discourse Linguistics, Dallas, TX: SIL, pp. 520–528
- Andersen (1995), "The Enigma of Genesis 14", in Wright, David P.; Freedman, David Noel (eds.), Pomegranates and Golden Bells: Studies in Biblical, Jewish, and Near Eastern Ritual, Law, and Literature in Honor of Jacob Milgrom, Winona Lake, IN: Eisenbrauns, pp. 497–508
- Andersen (1995), "Scholarly Editing of the Hebrew Bible", in Greethem, David (ed.), Scholarly Editing: An Introductory Guide to Research, New York: Modern Language Association of America, pp. 30–55
- Andersen, Francis; Freedman, David Noel (2000), Micah: A New Translation With Introduction and Commentary, Anchor Bible, vol. 24E, New York: Doubleday
- Andersen (2001), Habakkuk: A New Translation With Introduction and Commentary, Anchor Bible, vol. 25, New York: Doubleday, ISBN 0-385-08396-3

=== Chemistry ===
- Andersen (1950), "The Synthesis of Deuterium Compounds", Report of Conference on the Use of Isotopes in Scientific Research, University of Melbourne, pp. 195–204
- Andersen (1951), "Kinetic Studies in the Isotope Effect", Report of the Australian and New Zealand Association for the Advancement of Science, Brisbane, p. 192
- Andersen (1951), "The Synthesis of Deuterated Acetic Acid", Nature, vol. 1973, pp. 541–42

=== Computational linguistics ===
- Andersen, Francis I.; Forbes, A. Dean (1972), A Synoptic Concordance to Hosea, Amos, Micah, The Computer Bible, vol. 6, Wooster, OH: Biblical Research Associates
- Andersen, Francis I.; Forbes, A. Dean (1976), A Linguistic Concordance of Ruth and Jonah: Hebrew Vocabulary and Idiom, The Computer Bible, vol. 9, Wooster, OH: Biblical Research Associates
- Andersen, Francis I.; Forbes, A. Dean (1976), Eight Minor Prophets: A Linguistic Concordance, The Computer Bible, vol. 10, Wooster, OH: Biblical Research Associates
- Andersen, Francis I.; Forbes, A. Dean (1978), Jeremiah: A Linguistic Concordance: I Grammatical Vocabulary and Proper Nouns, The Computer Bible, vol. 14, Wooster, OH: Biblical Research Associates
- Andersen, Francis I.; Forbes, A. Dean (1978), Jeremiah: A Linguistic Concordance: II Nouns and Verbs, The Computer Bible, vol. 14A, Wooster, OH: Biblical Research Associates
- Andersen, Francis I.; Forbes, A. Dean (1986), "Problems in Taxonomy and Lemmatization", Proceedings of the First International Colloquium: Bible and the Computer – The Text, Paris-Geneva: Champion-Slatkine, pp. 37–50
- Andersen, Francis I.; Forbes, A. Dean (1987), "The Vocabulary of the Pentateuch", in Parunak, H.V.D. (ed.), Computer Tools for Ancient Texts: Proceedings of the 1980 Ann Arbor Symposium on Biblical Studies and the Computer, Winona Lake, IN: Eisenbrauns, pp. 231–267
- Andersen, Francis I.; Forbes, A. Dean (1989), The Vocabulary of the Old Testament, Rome: Pontifical Biblical Institute
- Andersen, Francis I.; Forbes, A. Dean (1989), "Methods and Tools for the Study of Old Testament Syntax", Proceedings of the Second International Colloquium: Bible and the Computer – Methods and Tools, Paris-Geneva: Champion-Slatkine, pp. 61–72
- Andersen, Francis I.; Forbes, A. Dean (1992), "On Marking Clause Boundaries", Proceedings of the Third International Colloquium: Bible and the Computer – Methods and Tools, Paris-Geneva: Champion-Slatkine, pp. 181–202
- Andersen, Francis I.; Forbes, A. Dean (1992), Baird, J. Arthur; Freedman, David Noel (eds.), A Key-word-in-context Concordance to Psalms, Job, and Proverbs, The Computer Bible, vol. 34, Wooster, OH: Biblical Research Associates
- Andersen, Francis I.; Forbes, A. Dean (1994), Baird, J. Arthur; Freedman, David Noel (eds.), A Key-word-in-context Concordance to the Pentateuch, The Computer Bible, vol. 35, Wooster, OH: Biblical Research Associates
- Andersen, Francis I.; Forbes, A. Dean (1998), "Towards a Clause-type Concordance of TNK", Proceedings of the Fifth International Colloquium: Bible and the Computer – Translation, Paris: Editions Honore Champion, pp. 41–70
- Andersen, Francis I.; Forbes, A. Dean, "Approximate Graph-Matching as an Enabler of Example-Based Translation", Proceedings of the Fifth International Colloquium: Bible and the Computer – Translation, Paris: Editions Honore Champion, pp. 285–314
- Andersen, Francis I.; Forbes, A. Dean, "What Kind of Taxonomy is Best for Feeding to Computer-assisted Research into the Syntax of a Natural Language?", Proceedings of the Sixth International Colloquium: From Alpha to Byte, Leiden: Brill, pp. 23–42
- Andersen, Francis I.; Forbes, A. Dean (2003), "Hebrew Grammar Visualized: I. Syntax", Ancient Near Eastern Studies, vol. 40, pp. 43–61
- Andersen, Francis I.; Forbes, A. Dean (2006), The Hebrew Bible: Andersen-Forbes Phrase Marker Analysis, Bellingham, WA: Logos Bible Software
- Andersen, Francis I.; Forbes, A. Dean (2006), A Systematic Glossary to the Andersen-Forbes Analysis of the Hebrew Bible, Lexham Bible Reference Series, Bellingham, WA: Logos Bible Software

=== Hebrew morphology ===
- Andersen (1969), "Construct -K- in Biblical Hebrew", Biblica, vol. 50, pp. 68–69
- Andersen (1970), "Biconsonantal Byforms in Biblical Hebrew", Zeitschrift für die Alttestamentliche Wissenschaft, vol. 82, pp. 270–274
- Andersen (1971), "Dimensions of Structure in the Hebrew Verb System", 1971 Work Papers of the Summer Institute of Linguistics, vol. 15, pp. MA4–MA12

=== Hebrew orthography ===
- Andersen (1970), "Orthography in Repetitive Parallelism", Journal of Biblical Literature, p. 89
- Andersen, Francis I.; Forbes, A. Dean (1985), Spelling in the Hebrew Bible: Mitchell Dahood Memorial Lectures, Biblica et Orientalia, vol. 41, Rome: Pontifical Biblical Institute
- Andersen, Francis I.; Forbes, A. Dean (1985), "Orthography and Text Transmission", TEXT, vol. 2, pp. 25–53
- Andersen, Francis I.; Freedman, David Noel (1987), "The Orthography of the Aramaic Portion of the Tel Fehariyeh Bilingual Inscription", in Claassen, W. (ed.), Text and Context: Old Testament and Semitic Studies for F. C. Fensham, JSOTSS, vol. 48, Sheffield: Almond, pp. 9–49
- Andersen, Francis I.; Freedman, David Noel (1989), "The Spelling of Samaria Papyrus 1", in Horgan, Maurya P.; Kobelski, Paul J. (eds.), To Touch the Text: Biblical and Related Studies in Honor of Joseph A. Fitzmyer S.J, New York: Crossroads, pp. 15–32
- Andersen, Francis I.; Freedman, David Noel; Forbes, A. Dean (1992), Propp, William H. (ed.), Studies in Hebrew and Aramaic Orthography, Biblical and Judaic Studies from the University of California, San Diego, vol. 2, Winona Lake, IN: Eisenbrauns
- Andersen, Francis I. (1999), "Orthography in Ancient Hebrew Inscriptions", Ancient Near Eastern Studies, vol. 36, pp. 5–35, doi:10.2143/ANES.36.0.525778

=== Hebrew syntax ===
- Andersen (1970), The Hebrew Verbless Clause in the Pentateuch, JBLMS, vol. 14, Nashville, TN: Abingdon
- Andersen (1974), The Sentence in Biblical Hebrew, Janua Linguarum, Series Practica, vol. 231, The Hague/Paris: Mouton
- Andersen, Francis I.; Forbes, A. Dean (1983), "'Prose Particle' Counts of the Hebrew Bible", in Meyers, Carol L.; O'Connor, M. (eds.), The Word of the Lord Shall Go Forth: Essays in Honor of David Noel Freedman in Celebration of His Sixtieth Birthday, Winona Lake, IN: Eisenbrauns, pp. 165–183
- Andersen (1994), "Salience, Implicature, Ambiguity, and Redundancy in Clause-clause Relationships in Biblical Hebrew", in Bergen, Robert D. (ed.), Biblical Hebrew and Discourse Linguistics, Dallas, TX: SIL, pp. 99–116
- Andersen (2003), "Lo and Behold! Taxonomy and Translation of Biblical Hebrew [hinneh]", in Baasten, M. F. J.; van Peursen, W. Th. (eds.), Hamlet on a Hill: Semitic and Greek Studies Presented to Professor T. Muraoka on the Occasion of his Sixty-Fifth Birthday, OLA, vol. 118, Leuven: Peeters, pp. 57–71
- Andersen, Francis I.; Forbes, A. Dean (2007), "The Participle in Biblical Hebrew and the Overlap of Grammar and Lexicon", in Malena, Sarah; Miano, David (eds.), Milk and Honey: Essays on Ancient Israel and the Bible in Appreciation of the Judaic Studies Program at the University of California, San Diego, Winona Lake, IN: Eisenbrauns, pp. 185–212

=== Pseudepigrapha ===
- Andersen (1983), "2 (Slavonic Apocalypse of) Enoch", in Charlesworth, James H. (ed.), Old Testament Pseudepigrapha, vol. 1, Garden City, NY: Doubleday, pp. 91–221
- Andersen, F. I. (1987), "Pseudepigrapha Studies in Bulgaria", Journal for the Study of the Pseudepigrapha, vol. 1, pp. 41–55, doi:10.1177/095182078700000104, S2CID 161661832
- Andersen (1992), "The Second Book of Enoch", in Freedman, David Noel (ed.), The Anchor Bible Dictionary, vol. 2, Garden City, NY: Doubleday, pp. 515–522
- Andersen (2008), "The Sun in 2 Enoch", in Lourié, Basil; Orlov, Andrei; Petit, Madeleine (eds.), L'église des deux Alliances: Mémorial Annie Jaubert (1912–1980), Orientalia Judaica Christiana: Christian Orient and its Jewish Heritage, vol. 1, Piscataway, NJ: Gorgias Press, pp. 1–38

=== Semitic languages ===
- Andersen (1966), "Moabite Syntax", Orientalia, vol. 35, pp. 81–120
- Andersen, Francis I.; Freedman, David Noel (1989), "Aleph as a Vowel Letter in Old Aramaic", in Horgan, Maurya P.; Kobelski, Paul J. (eds.), To Touch the Text: Biblical and Related Studies in Honor of Joseph A. Fitzmyer S.J, New York: Crossroads, pp. 3–14

=== Sociology ===
- Andersen (1959–60), "The Early Sumerian City-State in Recent Soviet Historiography", Abr-Nahrain, vol. 1, pp. 56–61
- Andersen (1969), "Israelite Kinship Terminology and Social Structure", The Bible Translator, vol. 20, no. 1, pp. 29–39
- Andersen (1976), "Wives and Daughters Last? Family Order in Mesopotamia and Israel", Ancient Society, vol. 6, no. 3, pp. 113–119
- Andersen (1977), "Slavery in the Ancient Near East", Ancient Society, vol. 7, pp. 144–190

=== Theology ===
- Andersen (1950), "The Modern Conception of the Universe in Relation to the Conception of God", Journal of Transactions of the Victoria Institute, vol. 82, pp. 79–111
- Andersen (1958), "Towards a Christian Philosophy of Science", Intervarsity Papers, vol. 4, pp. 16–23
- Andersen (1968), "Biblical Theology", The Encyclopedia of Christianity, vol. II, pp. 63–70
- Andersen (1975), "Dietrich Bonhoeffer and the Old Testament", Reformed Theological Review, vol. 34, pp. 33–44
- Andersen (1986), "Yahweh, the Kind and Sensitive God", in O'Brien, P. T.; Peterson, D. G. (eds.), God Who is Rich in Mercy, Homebush West, Australia: Lancer, pp. 41–88
