= William F. Albright =

American archaeologist and biblical scholar (1891–1971)

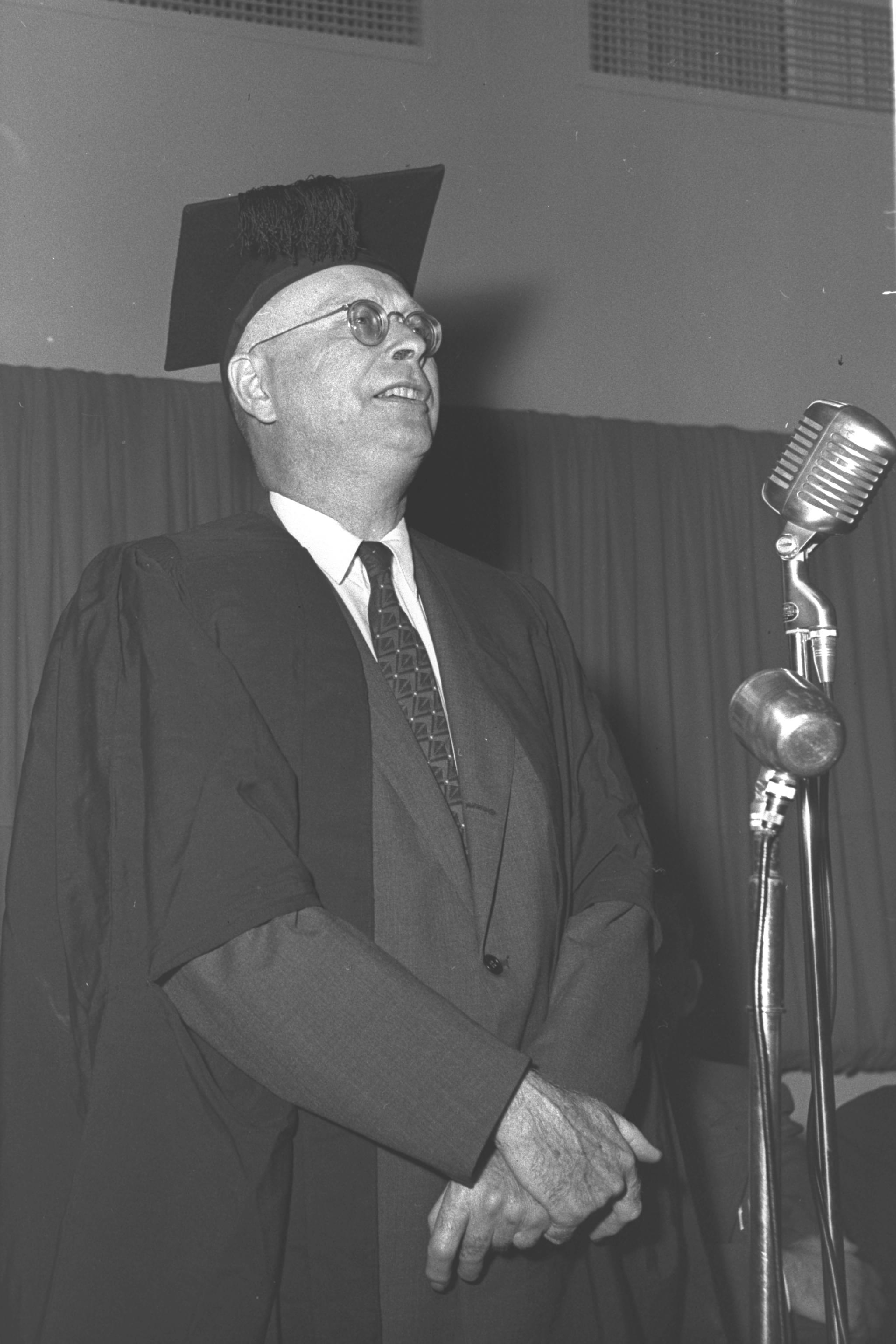
- Albright in 1957
- Born: May 24, 1891; Coquimbo, Chile
- Died: September 19, 1971 (aged 80); Baltimore, Maryland, U.S.

Academic background
- Education: Upper Iowa University; Johns Hopkins University
- Thesis: The Assyrian Deluge Epic (1916)
- Doctoral advisor: Paul Haupt
- Influences: Louis-Hugues Vincent

Academic work
- Discipline: Archaeology; biblical studies
- Sub-discipline: Biblical archaeology
- School or tradition: Biblical archaeology
- Doctoral students: Francis Andersen; Avraham Biran; John Bright; Raymond E. Brown; Frank Moore Cross; Mitchell Dahood; Joseph Fitzmyer; David Noel Freedman; William L. Moran; Abraham Sachs; Merrill Unger; G. Ernest Wright
- Notable students: Harry Orlinsky
- Influenced: Ruth Amiran; Nelson Glueck; Nancy Lapp; Jacob M. Myers

William Foxwell Albright (May 24, 1891 – September 19, 1971) was an American archaeologist, biblical scholar, philologist, and expert on ceramics. He is considered "one of the twentieth century's most influential American biblical scholars," having become known to the public in 1948 for his role in the authentication of the Dead Sea Scrolls. He was a leading theorist and practitioner of biblical archaeology, and is regarded as the founder of the biblical archaeology movement. Albright served as the W. W. Spence Professor of Semitic Languages at Johns Hopkins University from 1930 to 1958 and was the Director of the American School of Oriental Research in Jerusalem for several terms between 1922 and 1936.

== Biography ==
Albright was born on May 24, 1891, in Coquimbo, Chile, the eldest of six children of the American Evangelical Methodist missionaries Wilbur Finley Albright and Cornish-American Zephine Viola Foxwell. Albright was an alumnus of Upper Iowa University. He married Ruth Norton in 1921 and had four sons. He received his Doctor of Philosophy degree from Johns Hopkins University in Baltimore, Maryland, in 1916 and accepted a professorship there in 1927. Albright was W. W. Spence Professor of Semitic Languages from 1930 until his retirement in 1958. He was the Director of the American School of Oriental Research in Jerusalem from 1922 to 1929, and 1933–1936, and did important archaeological work at sites in Palestine such as Gibeah (Tell el-Fûl, 1922) and Tell Beit Mirsim (1926, 1928, 1930, and 1932).

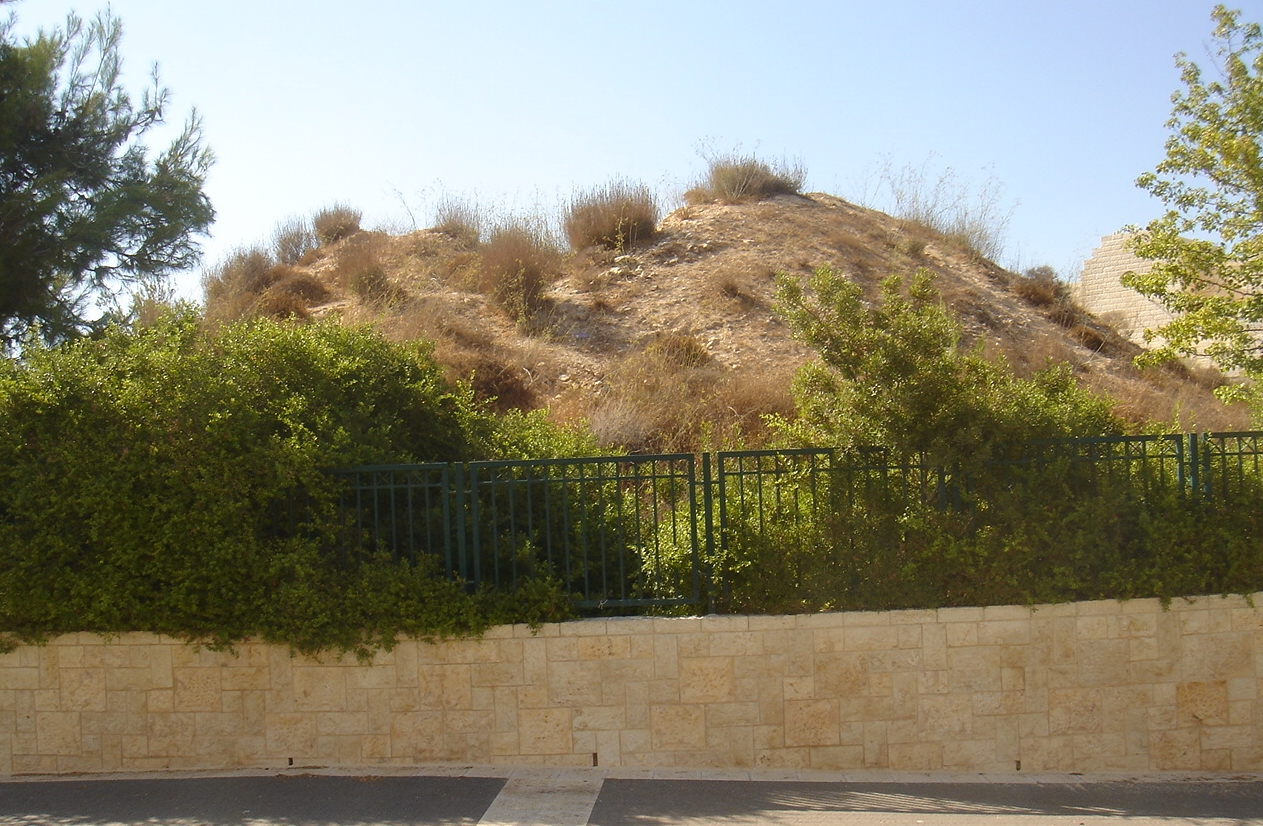
Tumulus 2 (Jerusalem), excavated by Albright in 1923. His excavation trench is still visible at the top of the structure.

Albright became known to the public in 1948 for his role in the authentication of the Dead Sea Scrolls, but made his scholarly reputation as the leading theorist and practitioner of biblical archaeology, "that branch of archaeology that sheds light upon 'the social and political structure, the religious concepts and practices and other human activities and relationships that are found in the Bible or pertain to peoples mentioned in the Bible." Albright was not, however, a biblical literalist; in his Yahweh and the Gods of Canaan, for example, he argued that Yahwism and ancient Caananite religion had a reciprocal relationship, in which "both gained much in the exchange which set in about the tenth century and continued until the fifth century B.C".

Although primarily a biblical archaeologist, Albright was a polymath who made contributions in almost every field of Near Eastern studies: an example of his range is a 1953 paper, "New Light from Egypt on the Chronology and History of Israel and Judah", in which he established that Egyptian pharaoh Shoshenq I—the Biblical Shishaq—came to power somewhere between 945 and 940 BC.

A prolific author, his works in addition to Yahweh and the Gods of Canaan, include The Archaeology of Palestine: From the Stone Age to Christianity, and The Biblical Period from Abraham to Ezra. He also edited the Anchor Bible volumes on Jeremiah, Matthew, and Revelation.

Throughout his life Albright was honored with awards, honorary doctorates, and medals, and was proclaimed "Yakir Yerushalayim" (Worthy Citizen of Jerusalem)—the first time that title had been awarded to a non-Jew. He was elected to the American Philosophical Society in 1929. He was elected a member of the United States National Academy of Sciences in 1955 and a Fellow of the American Academy of Arts and Sciences in 1956. After his death on September 19, 1971, his legacy continued through the many scholars inspired by his work, who specialized in the fields pioneered by Albright. The American School of Oriental Research, Jerusalem, was renamed the Albright Institute of Archaeological Research, in honor of Albright's archeological achievements.

== Historical research and hypotheses ==
From the 1930s until his death, he was the dean of biblical archaeologists and the acknowledged founder of the biblical archaeology movement. Coming from his background in German biblical criticism of the historicity of the biblical accounts, Albright, through his seminal work in archaeology (and his development of the standard pottery typology for Palestine and the Holy Land) concluded that the biblical accounts of Israelite history were, contrary to the dominant German biblical criticism of the day, largely accurate. This area remains widely contested among scholars. Albright's student George Ernest Wright inherited his leadership of the biblical archaeology movement, contributing definitive work at Shechem and Gezer. Albright inspired, trained and worked with the first generation of world-class Israeli archaeologists, who have carried on his work, and maintained his perspective.

Other students such as Joseph Fitzmyer, Frank Moore Cross, Raymond E. Brown, and David Noel Freedman, became international leaders in the study of the Bible and the ancient Near East, including Northwest Semitic epigraphy and paleography. John Bright, Cyrus H. McCormick Professor of Hebrew and Old Testament Interpretation at Union Seminary in Richmond (PhD, Johns Hopkins, 1940), went on to become "the first distinguished American historian of the Old Testament" and "arguably the most influential scholar of the Albright school", owing to his "distinctly American commonsense flavor, similar to that of W[illiam] James". Thus Albright and his students influenced a broad swath of American higher education from the 1940s through the 1970s, after which revisionist scholars such as T. L. Thompson, John Van Seters, Niels Peter Lemche, and Philip R. Davies developed and advanced a minimalist critique of Albright's view that archaeology supports the broad outlines of the history of Israel as presented in the Bible. Like other academic polymaths (Edmund Husserl in phenomenology and Max Weber in the fields of sociology and the sociology of religion), Albright created and advanced the discipline of biblical archaeology, which is now taught at universities worldwide and has exponents across national, cultural, and religious lines.

== Influence and legacy ==
Albright's publication in the Annual of the American Schools of Oriental Research, 1932, of his excavations of Tell Beit Mirsim, and descriptions of the Bronze Age and Iron Age layers at the site in 1938 and 1943, marked a major contribution to the dating of sites based on ceramic typologies, which is still in use. "With this work, Albright made Israeli archaeology into a science, instead of what it had formerly been: a digging in which the details are more or less well-described in an indifferent chronological framework which is as general as possible and often wildly wrong".

As editor of the Bulletin of the American Schools of Oriental Research from 1931 to 1968, Albright influenced biblical scholarship and Palestinian archaeology. Albright advocated "biblical archaeology" in which the archaeologist's task, according to fellow biblical archaeologist William G. Dever, is "to illuminate, to understand, and, in their greatest excesses, to 'prove' the Bible." Here, Albright's American Methodist upbringing was clearly apparent. He insisted, for example, that "as a whole, the picture in Genesis is historical, and there is no reason to doubt the general accuracy of the biographical details" (i.e., of figures such as Abraham). Similarly he claimed that archaeology had proved the essential historicity of the Book of Exodus, and the conquest of Canaan as described in the Book of Joshua and the Book of Judges.

In the years since his death, Albright's methods and conclusions have been increasingly questioned. In 1993, William G. Dever wrote that:

[Albright's] central theses have all been overturned, partly by further advances in Biblical criticism, but mostly by the continuing archaeological research of younger Americans and Israelis to whom he himself gave encouragement and momentum... The irony is that, in the long run, it will have been the newer 'secular' archaeology that contributed the most to Biblical studies, not 'Biblical archaeology.'

Biblical scholar Thomas L. Thompson wrote that by 2002 the methods of "biblical archaeology" had also become outmoded:

[Wright and Albright's] historical interpretation can make no claim to be objective, proceeding as it does from a methodology which distorts its data by selectivity which is hardly representative, which ignores the enormous lack of data for the history of the early second millennium, and which wilfully establishes hypotheses on the basis of unexamined biblical texts, to be proven by such (for this period) meaningless mathematical criteria as the "balance of probability" ...

== Publications ==
- The Archaeology of Palestine: From the Stone Age to Christianity (1940/rev.1960)
- From the Stone Age to Christianity: Monotheism and the Historical Process, Johns Hopkins Press, 1946
- Views of the Biblical World. Jerusalem: International Publishing Company J-m Ltd, 1959.
- Yahweh and the Gods of Canaan: An Historical Analysis of Two Contrasting Faiths (1968)
- Matthew (with C. S. Mann) in the Anchor Bible series (1971) ISBN 9780385086585
- The Biblical Period from Abraham to Ezra
- Albright, William F. (1923). "Interesting finds in tumuli near Jerusalem". Bulletin of the American Schools of Oriental Research. 10 (April): 1–3. doi:10.2307/1354763. JSTOR 1354763. S2CID 163409706.
- Albright, William F. (1953). "New Light from Egypt on the Chronology and History of Israel and Judah". Bulletin of the American Schools of Oriental Research. 130 (130): 4–11. doi:10.2307/3219011. JSTOR 3219011. S2CID 163812912.

== See also ==
- Biblical archaeology
- List of artifacts in biblical archaeology
- Views of the Biblical World

Professional and academic associations
| Preceded by William Hatch | President of the Society of Biblical; Literature and Exegesis; 1939 | Succeeded by Chester C. McCown |
Awards
| Preceded by Hetty Goldman | Gold Medal Award for Distinguished; Archaeological Achievement; 1967 | Succeeded by Gisela Richter |
