= William Propp =

American historian of Near-East civilizations (born 1957)

William H. C. Propp (born 1957) is an American historian of Near-East civilizations. Propp served as a professor of history at the University of California San Diego (UCSD) from 1983 until his retirement in 2017.

== Early life and education ==
Propp was born in 1957 and grew up in New York, the son of Theodore Propp, an attorney, and Ellen Propp, an editor.

Propp studied near eastern languages and civilizations at Harvard University, both as an undergraduate and a graduate student.

== Career ==
Propp began teaching at UC San Diego in 1983 in the Judaic Studies Department. He retired from UCSD in 2017.

Propp's work focuses on the biblical account concerning the Exodus. Propp supports the view that the biblical account of the Israelite Exodus from Egypt cannot be described as "historical", and that the potential evidence to support the account is too diffuse to be adequately tested. In terms of biblical narrative, Propp views features of the story, such as the hardening of Pharaoh's heart, as sharing similarities with other epics such as the Homeric epic where the gods implant either cowardice or courage into humans who already demonstrate bravery or fear. This may be viewed critically as a divine punishment for humans for sins that may ultimately be blamed instead on the gods themselves.

== Personal life ==
Propp married Anna Covici, a librarian, in 1991.

Along with his professional life as a scholar, Propp is also a musician, participating in the North Coast Symphony Orchestra of Southern California as a classical basoonist, and in the La Jolla Renaissance Singers as a choral singer (bass-baritone).

== Works ==
- Water in the Wilderness: A Biblical Motif and Its Mythological Background. Harvard Semitic Monographs, 1987.
- Editor with B. Halpern and D.N. Freedman, The Hebrew Bible and Its Interpreters. Eisenbrauns, 1990.
- Editor, Studies in Hebrew and Aramaic Orthography by F.I. Andersen, A.D. Forbes, and D.N. Freedman. Eisenbrauns, 1992.
- Exodus 1-18 in the Anchor Bible Series. Doubleday, 1998.
- Editor with R.E. Friedman, Le-David Maskil: A Birthday Tribute to David Noel Freedman. Eisenbrauns, 2004.
- Exodus 19-40. Anchor Bible. Doubleday, 2006.
