= P. Kyle McCarter Jr. =

Old Testament scholar

Peter Kyle McCarter Jr. (born 1945) is an Old Testament scholar. He is William Foxwell Albright Professor Emeritus in Biblical and Ancient Near Eastern Studies at Johns Hopkins University. McCarter is best known for his work on the Books of Samuel: he wrote volumes on I and II Samuel for the Anchor Bible Series.

== Book published in his honor ==
In 2022, Biblical scholars published a book in his honor titled "Biblical and Ancient Near Eastern Studies in Honor of P. Kyle McCarter Jr."
