= John Kaltner =

John Kaltner is an associate professor of religious studies and Virginia Ballou McGehee Professor of Muslim-Christian Relations at Rhodes College.

== Works ==
As author

- Jonah: A New Translation with Introduction and Commentary (2023) with Rhiannon Graybill and Steven L. McKenzie
- What Are They Saying about the Book of Jonah? (2023) with Rhiannon Graybill and Steven L. McKenzie
- How the Qur’an Interprets the Bible: Comparing Islamic, Jewish, and Christian Scriptures (2020) with Christopher Frechette
- What Do Our Neighbors Believe? Second Edition: Questions and Answers on Judaism, Christianity, and Islam (2019) with Micah Greenstein and Kendra Hotz
- Sleuthing the Bible: Clues That Unlock the Mysteries of the Text (2019) with Steven L. McKenzie
- The Bible and the Qur’an: Biblical Figures in the Islamic Tradition (2018) with Younus Mirza
- Reading the Old Testament Anew: Biblical Perspectives on Today’s Issues (2017)
- Islam: What Non-Muslims Should Know. Revised and expanded edition (2016)
- The Back Door Introduction to the Bible (2012) with Steven L. McKenzie
- Introducing the Qur′an for Today′s Reader (2011)
- The Uncensored Bible: The Bawdy and Naughty Bits of the Good Book (2008) with Steven L. McKenzie
- The Old Testament: Its Background, Growth, and Content (2007) with Steven L. McKenzie
- What Do Our Neighbors Believe? Questions and Answers on Judaism, Christianity, and Islam (2007) with Howard Greenstein and Kendra Hotz
- Islam: What Non-Muslims Should Know (2003)
- Inquiring of Joseph: Getting to Know a Biblical Character through the Qur’an: (2003)
- Ishmael Instructs Isaac: An Introduction to the Qur’an for Bible Readers (1999)
- The Use of Arabic in Biblical Hebrew Lexicography (1996)

As editor

- New Meanings for Ancient Texts: Recent Approaches to Biblical Criticisms and Their Applications (2013) with Steven L. McKenzie
- Inspired Speech: Prophecy in the Ancient Near East. Essays in Honor of Herbert B. Huffmon (2004) with Louis Stulman
- Beyond Babel: A Handbook for Biblical Hebrew and Related Languages (2002) with Steven L. McKenzie
