= Brian Peckham =

Canadian academic

J. Brian Peckham
- Born: January 28, 1934; Montreal, Quebec, Canada
- Died: October 19, 2008; Toronto, Ontario, Canada

Academic background
- Education: Harvard University

Academic work
- Institutions: Harvard University
- Main interests: Hebrew Bible
- Notable works: The Composition of the Deuteronomistic History (1985); History and Prophecy: The Development of Late Judean Literary Traditions (1993)

J. Brian Peckham (1934–2008) was a Canadian biblical scholar. He was professor of Near and Middle Eastern Civilizations at Regis College in the Toronto School of Theology and the Centre for the Study of Religion at the University of Toronto. In 1993, Peckham published "History and Prophecy: The Development of Late Judean Literary Traditions," which argues that the Bible was created from the beginning as a work of literature, and that biblical text was meant to be read and performed.
