= Mitchell Dahood =

American linguist (1922–1982)

- Born: February 2, 1922; Anaconda, Montana, U.S.
- Died: March 8, 1982 (aged 60); Rome, Italy
- Employer: Pontifical Biblical Institute

Academic background
- Education: Johns Hopkins University

Mitchell Joseph Dahood (February 2, 1922 – March 8, 1982) was an American Jesuit Hebraist and Bible scholar.

== Life and career ==
Mitchell Joseph Dahood was born on February 2, 1922 in Anaconda, Montana. He grew up in Concord, New Hampshire, and studied at Johns Hopkins University in Baltimore. He moved to Rome in 1957 where he became professor of the Hebrew language, and of the Ancient Near East languages Ugaritic and Eblaite, at the Pontifical Biblical Institute.

Among his works was a three-volume translation of the Psalms with commentary, originally published by Doubleday, and then re-published by Yale University Press in the Anchor Yale Bible Series. Dahood was known within the field of biblical studies for using information from Ugarit and the Ugaritic language (discovered first in 1929) as the basis for proposed new interpretations of passages in the Psalms, with sometimes controversial results.

Dahood died in Rome, Italy on March 8, 1982.
