= David Noel Freedman =

American biblical scholar, author, editor, archaeologist and priest (1922–2008)

- Born: Noel Freedman; May 12, 1922; New York City, US
- Died: April 8, 2008 (aged 85); Petaluma, California, US
- Father: David Freedman

Ecclesiastical career
- Religion: Christianity (Presbyterian)
- Church: ?; United Presbyterian Church in the United States of America; Presbyterian Church (USA)

Academic background
- Education: City College of New York; Princeton Theological Seminary; Johns Hopkins University

Academic work
- Discipline: Biblical studies
- Main interests: Dead Sea Scrolls
- Influenced: Laura Lederer; Kenneth Mathews

David Noel Freedman (12 May 1922 – 8 April 2008) was an American biblical scholar, author, editor, archaeologist, and, after his conversion from Judaism, a Presbyterian minister. He was one of the first Americans to work on the Dead Sea Scrolls. He is the son of the writer David Freedman. He died of a heart ailment.

== Life ==
Freedman was born Noel Freedman in New York City on May 12, 1922, to Jewish parents David and Beatrice Freedman. The elder Freedman died in 1936 and Noel adopted his name as a mark of respect. Soon after, he converted to Christianity and became a member of the Presbyterian Church. The New York Times misidentified Noel as a girl in David Freedman's obituary.

At the age of 13, Freedman began his college education at the City College of New York, where he studied for three years (1935-1938) before transferring to the University of California, Los Angeles. From 1938 to 1939 he studied at the UCLA and there, he completed his Bachelor of Arts degree in Modern European History in 1939, at the age of 17. From 1941 to 1944 Freedman entered the Princeton Theological Seminary, where he earned a Bachelor of Theology degree and was ordained a Presbyterian minister in 1944.

In 1944, Freedman married Cornelia Anne Pryor, and they later had four children. For one year, between 1944-1945, he served as pastor at Acme and Deming in Washington.

In 1946, he returned to academia, matriculating in the Department of Semitic Languages and Literature at the Johns Hopkins University. While studying at Johns Hopkins University, Freedman became acquainted with William F. Albright. This encounter began a lasting friendship and professional bond that lasted until Albright's death in 1971, and played a significant role in shaping Freedman's growth as a scholar. However, the first year of studies was demoralizing due to how demanding W. F. Albright was. Fortunately, the following year a new student enrolled, Frank Moore Cross, and sharing with him helped alleviate the tribulation he was experiencing.

In 1947, while he was still a graduate student, the excavation of caves near the Dead Sea was just beginning to unearth thousands of fragments of texts. He became one of the first American scholars to gain access and spent twenty years painstakingly studying and translating a scroll of Leviticus, one of the books of the Torah.

In 1947 Freedman became member of the American Schools of Oriental Research.

Freedman and Cross began working on their dissertations together. Because each thesis would only count for half the required credit with two authors, they needed to produce two separate dissertations in order to graduate:

1. Early Hebrew Orthography. A Study of the Epigraphic Evidence, on the orthography of ancient Hebrew inscriptions they analyzed Hebrew, Moabite, Aramaic, and Phoenician inscriptions. Their thesis deals with the vocalization of ancient Hebrew inscriptions and orthographic issues (e.g. matres lectiones; diphthongs).
2. Studies in ancient Yahwistic poetry, where they identified early Hebrew poems such as Jgs 5, Exod 15 were suggested as the earliest portions of the Hebrew Bible, dating between the 12th-9th cent. BCE.

Both theses were under the tutelage of W. F. Albright at Johns Hopkins University. Freedman earned his PhD in 1948 and Cross in 1950.

After receiving his doctorate in 1948, Freedman was appointed professor of Hebrew and Old Testament Literature at Western Theological Seminary (Pittsburgh, Pennsylvania).

From 1952 to 1959, Freedman was editor of the Journal of Biblical Literature (JBL) of the Society of Biblical Literature.

His most ambitious endeavor was his continuous role as editor of the Anchor Bible, a position he took on in 1956 in partnership with his mentor Albright. In 1971 with the death of Albright, Freedman assumed total responsibility and held the position as editor until his death. This Anchor Bible series features translations accompanied by detailed commentary on different books of the Bible. It is distinguished by its collaboration among Catholic, Protestant, and Jewish scholars and is notable for its impartial, scholarly examination of biblical texts.

From 1960 to 1964, as a member of the faculty, he taught at the Pittsburgh Theological Seminary.

From 1964-1971 Freedman was professor of the Old Testament at the Graduate Theological Union at Berkeley. During that same timeframe, he lectured on the Old Testament and Hebrew exegesis at San Francisco Theological Seminary, where he also held the position of Dean of the Faculty from 1966 to 1970, and served as Acting Dean of the Seminary during 1970-1971.

In 1971, the University of Michigan recruited him as a professor of Near Eastern Studies and appointed him as the director of the Program on Studies in Religion; he taught there until 1992.

Freedman was director of the Albright Institute of Archaeological Research from 1969 to 1970. From 1970 to 1982 Freedman was vicepresident of the American Schools of Oriental Research. From 1976 to 1977 he again was director of the Albright Institute of Archaeological Research.

In 1973, Freedman obtained a Doctor of Literature at the University of the Pacific (United States). In 1974 he obtained a Doctor of Science at the Davis & Elkins College.

From 1974 to 1978 Freedman was editor of the Bulletin of the American Schools of Oriental Research (BASOR). From March 1976 to 1982 he was editor of The Biblical Archeologist.

In 1976 Freedman was president of the Society of Biblical Literature.

In 1987 he was the Endowed Chair at the University of California.

His wife Cornelia died in 2004 after 60 years of marriage. David Noel Freedman died on April 8, 2008, at the age of 85, and was still active in teaching.

== Honors ==
- The David Noel Freedman Award for Excellence and Creativity in Hebrew Bible Scholarship, awarded by the Society of Biblical Literature, is named in his honour.

== Awards ==
- 1958 Guggenheim Fellowships of Near Eastern Studies.

== Festschrift ==
- Beck, Astrid B.; Bartelt, Andrew H.; Raabe, Paul R.; Franke, Chris A., eds. (1995). Fortunate the Eyes That See: Essays in Honor of David Noel Freedman in Celebration of His Seventieth Birthday. William B. Eerdmans Publishing Company. ISBN 9780802807908.
- Meyers, Carol L.; O'Connor, Michael Patrick, eds. (1983). The Word of the Lord Shall Go Forth: Essays in Honor of David Noel Freedman in Celebration of His Sixtieth Birthday. Eisenbrauns. ISBN 9780931464195.

== Bibliography ==
=== Dissertations ===
- Freedman, David Noel; Cross, Frank Moore (February 12, 2022) [1952]. Early Hebrew Orthography. A Study of the Epigraphic Evidence (PhD dual Dissertation. Johns Hopkins University. 1948). Eugene: Wipf and Stock Publishers. ISBN 978-1-6667-6655-4.
- Freedman, David Noel; Cross, Frank Moore (1975). Studies in ancient Yahwistic poetry (PhD dual Dissertation. Johns Hopkins University 1950.). Society of Biblical Literature, Missoula, Mont.: Scholars Press. ISBN 9780891300144.

=== Books ===
- Freedman, David Noel (1980). Pottery, Poetry, and Prophecy: Studies in Early Hebrew Poetry. G - Reference, Information and Interdisciplinary Subjects Series. Eisenbrauns. ISBN 9780931464041.
- Freedman, David Noel (1993). The Unity of the Hebrew Bible. Distinguished senior faculty lecture series. University of Michigan Press. ISBN 9780472082414.
- Freedman, David Noel (1999). Psalm 119: The Exaltation of Torah. San Diego Campus: Biblical and Judaic studies from the University of California, San Diego. Vol. 6. Eisenbrauns. ISBN 9781575060385.
- Freedman, David Noel; Myers, Allen C. (2000). Eerdmans Dictionary of the Bible. Amsterdam University Press. ISBN 9789053565032.

=== Articles ===
- Freedman, David Noel (1961). "The Chronicler's Purpose". The Catholic Biblical Quarterly. 23 (4): 436–442. JSTOR 43711061.
- Freedman, David Noel (1964). "Divine Commitment and Human Obligation: The Covenant Theme". Interpretation. 18 (4): 419–431. doi:10.1177/002096436401800403.
- Freedman, David Noel (1972). "Acrostics and Metrics in Hebrew Poetry". Harvard Theological Review. 65 (3): 367–392. doi:10.1017/S0017816000001620.
- Freedman, David Noel (1977). "Pottery, Poetry, and Prophecy: An Essay on Biblical Poetry". Journal of Biblical Literature. 96 (1): 5–26. doi:10.2307/3265324.

== See also ==
- Francis Andersen – Australian linguist (1925–2020)
- Frank Moore Cross – American scholar and academic
- Philip King (historian) – American historian (1925–2019)
