= George Wesley Buchanan =

American biblical scholar (1921–2019)

- Born: December 25, 1921
- Died: 2019 (aged 97–98)
- Education: Doctor of Philosophy, Master of Arts, Bachelor of Divinity, Bachelor of Arts
- Occupation: University teacher, theologian, New Testament scholar, writer, editing staff
- Employer: Wesley Theological Seminary
- Awards: emeritus (Wesley Theological Seminary)
- Position held: emeritus

George Wesley Buchanan (December 25, 1921 – 2019) was an American biblical scholar who was a Professor of New Testament at Wesley Theological Seminary in Washington, D.C. He was on the Editorial Advisory Board of the Biblical Archaeology Review.

== Life ==
Buchanan was ordained an elder in the United Methodist Church and pastored churches for fourteen years.

== Education ==
Buchanan earned his B.A. from Simpson College, his B.D. from Garrett-Evangelical Theological Seminary, his M.A. from Northwestern University, and his Ph.D. from Drew University.

He was the recipient of several research grants: Horowitz Fellow, Scheuer Fellow, Rosenstiel Fellow, Association of Theological Schools Fellow, and Society of Biblical Literature Fellow. He also was awarded with Alumni Achievement Award by Simpson College.

== Academic work ==
From 1960 to 1990 he worked as a professor at Wesley Theological Seminary, where he was appointed Professor Emeritus.

G. W. Buchanan was an author or editor of several books and was on the Editorial Committee and Editorial Advisory Board of the Biblical Archaeology Review.

He has also collaborated at Logos Bible Software with, among other works, the George Wesley Buchanan Collection (9 vols.), where he is placed as a biblical scholar, one of the main defenders of intertextual criticism and one of the best Bible scholars of the 20th century.

== Views ==
G. W. Buchanan was one of the people who purported he change in thinking regarding the location of the Jewish Temple. He changed his thinking about the location when he realized there is no natural spring on / under the Haram esh-Sharif. The gihon spring is a siphon spring located 600 feet south of Al Aqsa Mosque, where the Ophel originally stood.

Buchanan is one of the modern proponents that the Tetragrammaton YHWH was also pronounced Yehowah, contrary to the consensus that it was pronounced only Yahweh.

== Publications ==
- Buchanan, George (1941). Eschatology and the "End of days". University of Chicago. OCLC 1701413.
- Buchanan, George (1964). Too late to sacrifice. Pulpit Digest Pub. Co. OCLC 30935594.
- Buchanan, George (1965). Midrashim pré-Tannaïtes. Paris: Librairie Lecoffre. OCLC 31498665.
- Reimarus, Hermann Samuel (1970) [c.1750–60]. The Goal of Jesus and His Disciples [Von dem Zwecke Jesu und seiner Jünger]. Translated by Buchanan, George Wesley. Leiden: E. J. Brill. ISBN 9789004018563. The English title does not correspond to any work by Reimarius in either German or English Wikipedia.
- Buchanan, George (1972). To the Hebrews. Garden City: Doubleday. ISBN 0-385-02995-0.
- Buchanan, George (1978). Revelation and redemption : Jewish documents of deliverance from the fall of Jerusalem to the death of Naḥmanides. OCLC 4859611.
- Buchanan, George (1978). The prophet's mantle in the nation's capital. University Press of America. ISBN 0-8191-0545-7.
- Buchanan, George (1980). Worship, feasts and ceremonies in the early Jewish-Christian church. Cambridge University Press. OCLC 30985531.
- Buchanan, George (1984). Jesus, the King and His Kingdom. Macon: Mercer. ISBN 0-86554-072-1.
- Buchanan, George (1987). Typology and the Gospel. University Press of America. ISBN 0-8191-6377-5.
- Buchanan, George (1992). Biblical and Theological Insights from Ancient and Modern Civil Law. Lewiston: E. Mellen Press. ISBN 0-7734-9601-7.
- Buchanan, George (1993). New Testament Eschatology. Lewiston: Mellen Biblical Press. ISBN 0-7734-2378-8.
- Buchanan, George (1993). The Book of Revelation. Lewiston: Mellen Biblical Press. ISBN 0-7734-2365-6.
- Buchanan, George (1994). Introduction to Intertextuality. Lewiston: Mellen Biblical Press. ISBN 0-7734-2387-7.
- Buchanan, George (1999). The Book of Daniel. Lewiston: Mellen Biblical Press. ISBN 0-7734-2470-9.
- Buchanan, George (2003). Jewish Messianic movements : from AD 70 to AD 1300: documents from the fall of Jerusalem to the end of the Crusades. Wipf and Stock Pub. ISBN 1-59244-382-6.
