= David Brakke =

American New Testament scholar (1961-)

David Bernhard Brakke (born 1961) is an American New Testament scholar and historian of Christianity. He is Professor and Engle Chair in the History of Christianity at the Ohio State University. His work focuses on the first five centuries of Christianity, with particular focus on Christian asceticism, monasticism, Gnosticism, and the development of Christianity in Egypt, including several works on the Church Father Athanasius of Alexandria.

== Career ==
Brakke He received a B.A. in English from the University of Virginia in 1983, a Master of Divinity from Harvard University in 1986, and a Ph.D. in religious studies from Yale University in 1992. He was a visiting assistant professor at Concordia College from 1992 to 1993, and joined the faculty at Indiana University, Bloomington in 1993, where he was awarded a Mellon Fellow in the Humanities and recognized as Indiana University Outstanding Junior Faculty. He remained at Indiana for the next nineteen years before moving to OSU.

He is the author of many academic books, many of which have been very well received in the academic community. His The Gnostics: Myth, Ritual, and Diversity in Early Christianity (Harvard University Press, 2010) argues that the contested categories of "Gnosticism," "orthodoxy," and "heresy" in the era before Constantine the Great should be approached through a social and cultural lens. It was named a Choice Outstanding Academic Title for 2011.

Brakke has been awarded numerous fellowships, including an American Council of Learned Societies (ACLS) Junior Fellowship (1999-2000), the Alexander von Humboldt Research Fellowship (2002-2003), several National Endowment for the Humanities grants (1999-2000 and 2007-2010), a Luce and Huford Family Fellowship (2022-2023), and a John Simon Guggenheim Memorial Fellowship (2022). In 2023, he was in residence at the National Humanities Center.

Brakke was the editor of the Journal of Early Christian Studies from 2005 to 2015.

On February 15-17, 2023, a conference on "New Approaches to Asceticism in Late Antiquity" was held in his honor at Louisiana State University (LSU), cosponsored by LSU and University of Michigan faculty and attended by over two dozen colleagues.

In 2025, Brakke was elected into the American Academy of Arts & Sciences.

Also in 2025, Brepols published Discipline, Authority, and Text in Late Ancient Religion, a festschrift on religious practice in the Mediterranean, Near East, and Middle East from the second through eighth centuries, published in honor of "the impact that Professor David Brakke has had on the study of late antique religious history."

== Personal life ==
Brakke was born on May 10, 1961, in Long Beach, California.

== Bibliography ==
- The Gnostics: Myth, Ritual, and Diversity in Early Christianity. Harvard University Press, US. 2010. ISBN 9780674066038.
- David Brakke — Google Scholar entry
