= G. Ernest Wright =

Biblical scholar (1909–1974)

George Ernest Wright
- Born: September 5, 1909; Granville, Ohio, US
- Died: August 29, 1974 (aged 64); Massachusetts, US
- Known for: Old Testament scholarship Biblical archaeology Ancient Near Eastern archaeology Dating of ancient pottery Biblical theology movement
- Spouse: Emily DeNyse Wright
- Children: Three sons and a daughter

Academic background
- Education: College of Wooster; McCormick Theological Seminary; Johns Hopkins University
- Thesis: "The Pottery of Palestine from Earliest Times to the End of the Early Bronze Age" (1937)
- Doctoral advisor: William Foxwell Albright at Johns Hopkins University

Academic work
- Discipline: Old Testament scholar, Biblical archaeologist, Biblical era Palestinian material culture
- School or tradition: Neo-Orthodox Presbyterianism

George Ernest Wright (September 5, 1909 – August 29, 1974), was a leading Old Testament scholar and biblical archaeologist. An expert in Ancient Near Eastern archaeology, he was especially known for his work in the study and dating of pottery. He was associated with the biblical theology movement.

== Biography ==
He was born on September 5, 1909, in Ohio, son of a Presbyterian minister. He received his B.A. from the College of Wooster (Ohio) and his Bachelor of Divinity from McCormick Theological Seminary in 1934. The same year he was ordained in the Presbyterian church.

He studied with William Foxwell Albright at Johns Hopkins University, where he received his M.A. (1936) and PhD. (1937). He taught Old Testament History and Theology at McCormick Seminary from 1939 to 1958. He joined the faculty of Harvard Divinity School in 1958, where he was Parkman Professor and the Curator of the Semitic Museum (the latter beginning in 1961) until his death from a heart attack on August 29, 1974.

== Legacy ==
Professor Wright published numerous monographs and articles on subjects ranging from biblical theology to Palestinian archaeology. He was also the founder of the periodical The Biblical Archaeologist, a magazine now known as Near Eastern Archaeology. He was a staunch defender of the relevance of Old Testament study to the Christian faith.

== Archaeological expeditions ==
During his teaching career, professor Wright directed three archaeological expeditions:

- (1956–1974) Drew-McCormick Archaeological Expedition to Shechem;
- (1964–1965) Hebrew Union College Biblical and Archaeological School Expedition at Gezer;
- (1971–1974) Joint American Expedition to Idalion, Cyprus (1971–1974).

== Bibliography ==
Some of his publications include:

- The pottery of Palestine from the earliest times to the eighteenth century B.C (1937);
- Iron: the date of its introduction into common use in Palestine (1939)
- The Old Testament: Impediment or bulwark of the Christian faith? -McCormick Seminary addresses-(1945);
- God Who Acts, Biblical Theology as Recital (1952);
- The faith of Israel (1952);
- The Biblical doctrine of man in society -Ecumenical biblical studies- (1954);
- The pottery of Palestine from the earliest times to the end of the early Bronze Age (1962);
- Archaeology, history, and theology (1964);
- The challenge of Israel's faith (1956);
- The Westminster Historical Atlas to the Bible (1956);
- Biblical Archaeology (1957);
- Bringing Old Testament times to life (1957);
- The Book of the Acts of God: Christian Scholarship Interprets the Bible, with Reginald H. Fuller (1957) Full text. Doubleday.
- A hiding place of sinners: An exposition of Jeremiah 7:1-15 ... -A sermon delivered in the McCormick Seminary Chapel, Feb. 3; to the pre-Lenten conference ... of Harvard Divinity School on Feb. 12.- (1958);
- An introduction to Biblical archaeology -Studies in theology- (1960);
- The Bible and the ancient Near East: Essays in honor of William Foxwell Albright (1961);
- Isaiah (1964);
- Biblical Archaeology (1962);
- The Old Testament Against Its Environment (1962);
- Shechem, Biography of a Biblical City (1965);
- The Book of the acts of God: Modern Christian scholarship interprets the Bible (1965);
- The Old Testament and Theology (1969);
- The thousand years before Christ (1969);
- The book of Isaiah -The Layman's Bible commentary-(1972);
