= Marvin H. Pope =

American Hebrew scholar (1916–1997)

Marvin Hoyle Pope (June 23, 1916 – June 13, 1997) was a scholar of ancient Semitic languages, including Ugaritic and Iron Age Hebrew. He served in the faculty of Near Eastern Languages and Civilizations at Yale University from 1949 to 1986 before taking emeritus status, but continued work as a research scholar afterward.

He served on the committee of the National Council of Churches that created the New Revised Standard Version (NRSV) translation of the Bible, specializing in the Old Testament.

== Biography ==
Marvin Pope was born on June 23, 1916, in Durham, North Carolina to Charles Pope and Bessie Cleveland Sorrell Pope. He attended Duke University as an undergraduate, where he said he signed up for a Hebrew language course by mistake, yet stuck it out. After earning his bachelor's degree in 1938, he earned a master's degree in Hebrew in 1939. He went to Yale University in New Haven, Connecticut for his doctoral studies, where he studied under Albrecht Goetze and Julian Obermann. He earned his PhD in 1949. The same year, he became a member of the faculty of the Department of Near Eastern Languages and Civilizations at Yale. He would eventually hold the named chair position of Louis M. Rabinowitz Chair of Semitic Languages and Literatures.

Pope became an expert on the city of Ugarit and the Ugaritic texts found in 1928–29. The Ugaritic language is somewhat similar to Biblical Hebrew and offers a rare chance for comparison and cognates; he used this expertise to offer retranslations of the Book of Job and the Song of Songs, as well as a better understanding of how ancient scribes compressed their writings.

Pope served on the Biblical revision committee of the National Council of Churches from 1960 until his death. At first, the committee only published new editions of the Revised Standard Version (RSV) with minor adjustments, but eventually work began on a full new translation. This translation would become the New Revised Standard Version (NRSV), published in 1989.

He served at Yale until 1986, when he took on a position as Senior Research Scholar. He held a position of visiting scholar at the Institute Ugarit-forschung at the University of Münster in Münster, West Germany, in 1986 and in 1990. He was also a member of various scholarly committees and organizations, including the American Oriental Society, the American Society for the Study of Religions, and the Society for Biblical Literature (SBL).

Pope's first wife, Helen Thompson Pope, died in 1979. His second wife, Ingrid Bloomquist Pope, survived him. Pope died on June 13, 1997, at the First Church of Round Hill in Greenwich.

== Selected works ==
- Pope, Marvin H. (1955). El in the Ugaritic texts. Supplements to Vetus Testamentum. Brill.
- Pope, Marvin H.; Röllig, Wolfgang (1962). "Die Mythologie der Ugariter und Phönizier". Wörterbuch der Mythologie (in German).
- Pope, Marvin H. (1965). Job. The Anchor Bible Series 15. Doubleday. LCCN 65-12361. (2nd edition 1975, 3rd edition 2000) (Note: The 1987 bibliography of Pope in his festschrift writes a 1st edition of Job was published in 1963, but if it was, it was extremely obscure. The 1965 edition doesn't include anything in the forward or front matter indicating it is a second edition, and other sources indicate 1965 was the first publication. This bibliography also says that the 2nd edition was published in 1973 and calls it the third edition, but other sources indicate 1975 and call it a second edition.)
- Pope, Marvin H. (1977). Song of Songs. The Anchor Bible Series 7C. Doubleday. ISBN 978-0-3850-0569-2.

Festschrift

- Marks, John H.; Good, Robert McClive, eds. (1987). Love & Death in the Ancient Near East: Essays in honor of Marvin H. Pope. ISBN 9780931500060.
