= James L. Crenshaw =

American biblical scholar (born 1934)

- Born: December 19, 1934 (age 91); South Carolina, U.S.

James L. Crenshaw is the Robert L. Flowers Professor of the Old Testament at Duke University Divinity School. He is one of the world’s leading scholars in Old Testament Wisdom literature. He proposes that much of Proverbs was brought together at a time well after Solomon. He has been described as "a highly respected scholar" and an "excellent teacher".

== Academic career ==
James L. Crenshaw was born in Sunset, South Carolina, on December 19, 1934, and educated at Furman University (B.A., 1956), Southern Baptist Theological Seminary (B.D., 1960), and Vanderbilt University (Ph.D., 1964), where he concentrated in Hebrew Bible under J. Phillip Hyatt and Walter Harrelson. In addition, he studied at the Hebrew Union College Biblical and Archaeological School, Jerusalem (1963), and did postdoctoral studies at the University of Heidelberg (1972–73), Oxford University (1978–79), and Cambridge University (1984–85). He began his academic teaching career at Atlantic Christian College (1964–65), and then at Mercer University (1965–69), Vanderbilt University (1970–87), and finally Duke University (1987-2008), where he became the Robert L. Flowers Distinguished Professor. He was also a visiting scholar at Columbia University in the summer of 1967, and the Joseph McCarthy Visiting Professor at the Pontifical Biblical Institute in Rome in 2006-2007. Widely regarded as a superb classroom teacher, he often lectured without notes on the most complex topics. Currently, Crenshaw resides in Nashville, Tennessee (2008–present).

Crenshaw has received numerous academic honors. A review article in the Religious Studies Review (1994) profiled his scholarly achievements, and a Festschrift was dedicated to him in 2000. Furman University, his alma mater, awarded him an honorary doctorate (1993), and he served as editor of the prestigious Society of Biblical Literature Monograph Series (1978–84). A member of Phi Beta Kappa and a Guggenheim Fellow, he has also received fellowships from the Society for Religion in Higher Education, the National Endowment for the Humanities, the Pew Evangelical Scholarship Program, and grants from the American Association for Theological Schools and the American Council of Learned Societies. In 2015 he received the Distinguished Alumnus Award from the Graduate Department of Religion at Vanderbilt University. Always active in community affairs, while at Duke he served on the Institute for Care at the End of Life, a joint endeavor of the Duke Medical and Divinity Schools. During his tenure at Vanderbilt, he participated in Jewish-Christian dialogue with the Anti-Defamation League and, in retirement, serves as a teacher in OLLI, Vanderbilt's Learning in Retirement program, as well as a teacher at various churches and synagogues.

Crenshaw first drew the attention of the academic world with his influential article, "Method in Determining Wisdom Influence upon 'Historical' Literature" (1969), in which he argued for stricter controls in identifying wisdom in non-wisdom biblical texts. Wisdom consists, Crenshaw argued, in a tradition, a particular approach to reality, and a body of literature at home in a "specifically defined movement," a complex definition he worked out more precisely in his later Old Testament Wisdom. His first monograph, Prophetic Conflict (1971), growing out of his article, "Popular Questioning of the Justice of God in Ancient Israel," signaled a lifelong interest in dissent and protest literature in wisdom and the Hebrew Bible. This led to a special focus on the problem of theodicy in wisdom, resulting in a series of books and articles on this theme. Throughout all these publications Crenshaw sought a deeper appreciation of biblical protest literature—particularly dissent in Job and Ecclesiastes—and to integrate it into the mainstream of modern religious discourse. His important Defending God broadened the search, while his commentaries on Ecclesiastes in the prestigious Westminster Old Testament Library series and Joel in the Anchor Bible narrowed it within specific literature. Through all Crenshaw's published work to a greater or lesser degree runs the theme of theodicy. He has, as colleagues indicate, spent a "lifetime of storming the gates of heaven in search of an answer to the problem of evil." Crenshaw's comprehensive interest in Hebrew wisdom has led him to contribute articles on wisdom in a number of leading religious encyclopedias, journals, and special monographs.

While Crenshaw's work has concentrated on Hebrew wisdom, he has also produced a major introduction to the Hebrew Bible, commentaries on Joel and Sirach, a critical study of Samson, and an introduction to the life and work of Gerhard von Rad. He launched the series Personalities of the Old Testament at the University of South Carolina Press to emphasize the beauty and profundity of the biblical literature. To date in this series seventeen volumes have been published. His literary output in Hebrew Bible scholarship has included nearly 200 articles in major journals, encyclopedias, and monographs, including a book of poems, Dust and Ashes (2010), and major plenary addresses at the International Organization for the Study of the Old Testament (Vienna, 1980; Cambridge, 1995), the Biblical Colloquium (Louven, 1978, 1998), the Eleventh World Congress of Jewish Studies (Jerusalem, 1993), and the Symposium on the Language of Qoheleth (Louven, 2004). He is a much sought-after contributor to various Festschriften. His Story and Faith (1986), Old Testament Wisdom (2010), Education in Ancient Israel (1998), and Psalms: An Introduction (2001), Reading Job: A Literary and Theological Commentary (2011), and Sipping at the Cup of Wisdom (2017), a two-volume history of wisdom research and selected essays on wisdom, have become standard texts in many universities and seminaries.

"How can one talk meaningfully about God?" Crenshaw reflects, is the question that has guided his life's work. To this end, he has mined the biblical text—"with stammering tongue"—to illuminate the spiritual quest of the biblical writers, editors, and characters, and thereby shed light upon the eternal spiritual quest of all humanity.

== Published works ==
=== Books ===
- Defending God: Biblical Responses to the Problem of Evil
- Old Testament Wisdom: An Introduction, described by one critic as "a challenging yet valuable book".
- The Psalms: An Introduction, which was reviewed in Hebrew Studies.
- Reading Job: A Literary and Theological Commentary (Reading the Old Testament)
- Story and Faith: A Guide to the Old Testament
- Sipping from the Cup of Wisdom (2 vols.)

==== Anchor Bible project ====
- Education in Ancient Israel: Across the Deadening Silence (The Anchor Yale Bible Reference Library)
- Joel (The Anchor Yale Bible Commentaries)

=== Monographs ===
- Education in Ancient Israel (1998)
- Prophetic Conflict (1971)
- A Whirlpool of Torment (1984)
