= Bulletin of the American Society of Overseas Research =

- Discipline: Religious studies, Ancient Near East
- Language: English

Publication details
- Former names: Bulletin of the American Schools of Oriental Research, Bulletin of the American School of Oriental Research in Jerusalem
- History: 1919–present
- Publisher: University of Chicago Press for the American Society of Overseas Research (United States)
- Frequency: Biannual

Standard abbreviations
- ISO 4: Bull. Am. Sch. Orient. Res.

Indexing
- ISSN: 0003-097X
- JSTOR: bullamerschoorie
- OCLC no.: 05748058

Links
- Journal homepage

The Bulletin of the American Society of Overseas Research (BASOR), formerly the Bulletin of the American Schools of Oriental Research, is one of three academic journals published by the American Society of Overseas Research. It began as the Bulletin of the American School of Oriental Research in Jerusalem, in 1919. The Bulletin took on its current name in 2020.
