= Rhiannon Graybill =

Rhiannon Graybill is a Professor of Religious Studies. She is the Marcus M. and Carole M. Weinstein & Gilbert M. and Fannie S. Rosenthal Chair of Jewish Studies at the University of Richmond. She is a specialist in the Hebrew Bible.

== Education ==
Graybill received her PhD in Near Eastern Studies, from the University of California, Berkeley in 2012. Her thesis was entitled Men in Travail: Masculinity and the Problems of the Body in the Hebrew Prophets. Her doctoral supervisor was Robert Alter.

== Career ==
Graybill is the author of Are We Not Men? Unstable Masculinity in the Hebrew Prophets, published by Oxford University Press in 2016. She published her second book, Texts after Terror: Rape, Sexual Violence, and the Hebrew Bible again with Oxford University Press (2021). Texts after Terror received the American Academy of Religion's 2022 Award for Excellence in the Study of Religion. Graybill is the co-editor, with Robert L. Seesengood, of the journal The Bible and Critical Theory.

== Bibliography ==
- (with John Kaltner and Steven L. McKenzie) Jonah: A New Translation with Introduction and Commentary (Anchor Yale Bible Commentaries Series, 2023)
- (with John Kaltner and Steven L. McKenzie) What Are They Saying about the Book of Jonah? (Paulist Press, 2023)
- (with M. Cooper Minister and Beatrice Lawrence) Rape Culture and Religious Studies: Critical and Pedagogical Engagements (Lexington, 2019)
- (with Lynn R. Huber) The Bible, Gender, and Sexuality: Critical Readings (Bloomsbury/T.&T. Clark, 2020)
- (with Peter J. Sabo) “Who Knows What We’d Make of It, If We Ever Got Our Hands on It?”: The Bible and Margaret Atwood (Gorgias, 2021)
- (with Kent L. Brintnall and Linn Marie Tonstad) Lee Edelman and the Queer Study of Religion (Routledge, 2023)
- (with L. Juliana M. Claassens and Christi M. Maier) Narrating Rape: Shifting Perspectives in Biblical Literature and Popular Culture (SCM Press, 2024)
