= Roy Marom =

Israeli historian

- Known for: Curator of the Palestinian Rural History Project

Academic background
- Education: Tel Aviv University; University of Haifa

Academic work
- Institutions: University of California, Berkeley; Van Leer Jerusalem Institute

Roy Marom (Hebrew: רוֹעי מָרוֹם, Arabic: روعي مروم) is an Israeli historian and historical geographer. Marom is the curator of the Palestinian Rural History Project, which specializes in the history of the Palestinian countryside during the Ottoman and British Mandate periods.

== Career ==
Marom acquired his education at Tel Aviv University and the University of Haifa. He wrote his doctoral dissertation in Middle Eastern studies. His doctoral advisors were Mahmoud Yazbak and Ido Shahar. Marom was affiliated with the University of California, Berkeley. In 2024, he served as the Ernest S. Frerichs Annual Professor at the Albright Institute of Archaeological Research in Jerusalem.

Marom has participated in the Archaeological Survey of Israel project, and is co-author of one of its survey maps. He curated the archeological collections in Beit ha-Rishonim Museum (Even Yehuda) and al-Qasemi Academic College's Museum (Baqa al-Gharbiya).

Marom is an associate of the Jezreel Valley Regional Project and has led interdisciplinary projects about key archaeological sites in Israel/Palestine, publishing works about Lajjun, Ashdod-Yam, Ras al-'Ain, Ramat HaNadiv, Al-Shaykh Muwannis, al-Muzayri'a, Majdal Yaba, Mulabbis, Jindas, and Hamama.

Marom has specialized in local history of Arab villages and moshavot, inspiring hikers and history enthusiasts alike. Marom identified the inhabitants of Mulabbis, which preceded Petah Tikva, the first moshava. Marom's studies of the Forest of the Plain of Sharon enabled environmental conversation efforts to preserve the area's remaining Mt. Tabor Oak trees. Marom researched the first world war, discovering an Ottoman military cemetery near Even Yehuda.

In 2018, Marom published an opinion piece about Palestinian land use before the establishment of Kibbutz Nir David among supposedly “swampy wastelands.” The piece drew significant press coverage in the context of ongoing social justice debates about ownership and access rights to the 'Asi River in Beth She'an.

Marom has been awarded national-level prizes and fellowships, including by the Fulbright Association, Azrieli Foundation, Dan David Foundation, the Polonsky Academy at the Van Leer Jerusalem Institute, the Martin Buber Society of Fellows at the Hebrew University (offered), Yad Ben Tzvi, the Israeli Geographical Association and The Middle East & Islamic Studies Association of Israel.

Marom's work has been covered in different international, Palestinian, and Israeli News media outlets, including Al-Quds Al-Arabi, Ynet, Panorama, Arab 48, Zochrot, Siha Mekomit, Dunya al-Watan, and MadarCenter, among others.

== Selected works ==
- Marom, Roy (2024). "The Palestinian Rural Notables' Class in Ascendency: The Hannun Family of Tulkarm (Palestine)" (PDF). Journal of Holy Land and Palestine Studies. 23 (1): 77–108. doi:10.3366/hlps.2024.0327.
- Marom, Roy; Tepper, Yotam; Adams, Matthew J. (2024). "Al-Lajjun: a Social and geographic account of a Palestinian Village during the British Mandate Period". British Journal of Middle Eastern Studies. 52 (2): 374–400. doi:10.1080/13530194.2023.2279340.
- Marom, Roy; Taxel, Itamar (2024). "Hamama: The Palestinian Countryside in Bloom (1750–1948)". Journal of Islamic Archaeology. 11 (1): 83–110. doi:10.1558/jia.26586.
- Marom, Roy; Taxel, Itamar (2023). "Ḥamāma: The historical geography of settlement continuity and change in Majdal 'Asqālan's hinterland, 1270–1750 CE" (PDF). Journal of Historical Geography. 82: 49–65. doi:10.1016/j.jhg.2023.08.003.
- Marom, Roy; Tepper, Yotam; Adams, Matthew J. (2023). "Lajjun: Forgotten provincial capital in Ottoman Palestine". Levant. 55 (2): 218–241. doi:10.1080/00758914.2023.2202484.
- Marom, Roy (2023). "The Abu Hameds of Mulabbis: An oral history of a Palestinian village depopulated in the Late Ottoman period". British Journal of Middle Eastern Studies. 50: 87–106. doi:10.1080/13530194.2021.1934817.
- Marom, Roy (2024). "Hadera: Transnational migrations from Eastern Europe to Ottoman Palestine and the glocal origins of the Zionist-Arab conflict". Middle Eastern Studies. 60 (2): 250–270. doi:10.1080/00263206.2023.2183499.
- Marom, Roy (2020). "RAF ein Shemer: A Forgotten Case of Jewish and Arab Work in a British Army Camp in Palestine during the Second World War" (PDF). War & Society. 39 (3): 189–209. doi:10.1080/07292473.2020.1786889.
- Marom, Roy (2019). "A short history of Mulabbis (Petah Tikva, Israel)". Palestine Exploration Quarterly. 151 (2): 134–145. doi:10.1080/00310328.2019.1621734.
- Roy, Marom (2008). "From Time Immemorial: Chapters in the History of Even Yehuda and Its Region in Light of Historical and Archeological Research". Even Yehuda: Even Yehuda Local Municipality.
