= Albright Institute of Archaeological Research =

Research institute in Jerusalem (founded 1900)

W. F. Albright Institute of Archaeological Research
- Type: Private research institute
- Established: 1900; 126 years ago
- Affiliations: American Society of Overseas Research, Council of American Overseas Research Centers
- Director: Dr. James Fraser
- Faculty: 54
- Location: Jerusalem
- Website: http://www.aiar.org/

The W. F. Albright Institute of Archaeological Research (AIAR) is an archaeological research institution located in East Jerusalem. It is the oldest American research center for ancient Near Eastern studies in the Middle East. Founded in 1900 as the American School of Oriental Research, it was renamed in 1970 after its most distinguished director and the father of biblical archaeology, William F. Albright. Its mission is to develop and disseminate scholarly knowledge of the literature, history, and culture of the Near East, as well as the study of civilization from pre-history to the early Islamic period.

Today, the Albright Institute is one of three separately incorporated institutes affiliated with the American Society of Overseas Research (ASOR), the others being the American Center of Oriental Research – American Center of Research in Amman, Jordan, and the Cyprus American Archaeological Research Institute – CAARI – in Nicosia, Cyprus. In 1948, the then American Society of Overseas Research, also known as the Jerusalem School, played a significant role in the discovery and identification of the Dead Sea Scrolls (see below). Between 1981 and 1996, the Albright Institute, together with the Institute of Archaeology, Hebrew University of Jerusalem, excavated at the ancient Philistine site of Tel Miqne-Ekron, one of the five Philistine capital cities mentioned in the Bible. With the appointment of the new director, Matthew J. Adams (2014), the institute is now engaged in the Jezreel Valley Regional Project, a long-term, multi-disciplinary survey and excavation project investigating the history of human activity in the Jezreel Valley from the Paleolithic through the Ottoman period.

Located in a 1920s-period building, now a Jerusalem landmark, the Albright maintains residential and research facilities including a 35,000 volume library, publications offices, and archaeological laboratories.

== Campus ==
The Albright Institute campus is located at 26 Salah ed-Din St. in East Jerusalem.

== Library ==
The Albright Institute's library is a non-circulating library open to its fellows and researchers in Jerusalem. The collection holds more than 20,000 volumes. The library uses the ExLibria Alma automation system with Primo interface. The catalog is available online. The institute's extensive map collection has recently been made available online free of charge.

== The Dead Sea Scrolls ==
The institute played a significant role in the discovery and preservation of the Dead Sea Scrolls. The scrolls contain approximately eight hundred separate works written between the 2nd century BCE and the 1st century CE. They include the only Jewish Bible manuscripts from that period, including a manuscript of Exodus that dates to c. 250 BCE. Manuscripts or fragments of every book in the Hebrew Bible except the Book of Esther were unearthed, as well as many other Jewish religious texts, many previously unknown. Most scholars believe that the Dead Sea Scrolls were the property of the Essenes who lived at the site of Khirbet Qumran. The Essenes were a Jewish sect active in the last century BCE and the first century CE, at the same time as the Pharisees and the Sadducees.

In the spring of 1948, the institute was contacted by a representative of Mar Samuel, the metropolitan (archbishop) of the Syrian Orthodox Church in Jerusalem, who wanted to authenticate four ancient scrolls that he had recently purchased from an antiquities dealer. One of the younger scholars in residence at the institute at that time, John C. Trever, recognized the antiquity of the manuscripts and photographed three of the four scrolls in the basement of the Albright under very adverse conditions. Trever was the first to photograph 1QIsaiah(a), a complete scroll of the book of Isaiah dating to approximately 100 BCE. Trever sent copies of his photographs to his mentor—famed Near Eastern scholar and former institute director William F. Albright, who sent him a telegram congratulating him on the "greatest manuscript discovery of modern times!”

In early September 1948, Mar Samuel contacted ASO—currently the Albright Institute—in Jerusalem and the then director Professor Ovid R. Sellers. Samuel showed Sellers some additional scroll fragments that he had acquired. Sellers then focused on finding the cave in which the scrolls had been found. In late 1948, nearly two years after the discovery of the scrolls, scholars had yet to locate the cave where the fragments had been found. Conducting such a search was dangerous. When the British mandate in Palestine ended on May 15, 1948, war broke out immediately, and peace would not be restored until November. The cave was finally discovered on January 28, 1949, by a UN observer, and Sellers brought his box brownie camera to take the first photos of the cave, which were soon published in Life magazine.

In 1952, Roland de Vaux, the head of the French Biblical School in Jerusalem, organized a search of the caves in the cliffs above the Dead Sea near the site of Qumran. ASOR joined this expedition, and discovered Cave 3, the cave in which the famous Copper Scroll was found. Cave 3 was the only Qumran cave to be completely excavated by professional archaeologists.

The Albright Institute continues to play a role in scrolls scholarship to the present day. In the 1990s, Board Chair Joy Ungerleider established a Dorot Dead Sea Scrolls fellowship at the Albright to enable young American scholars to work on the scroll fragments in the nearby Rockefeller Museum. One of the first holders of this fellowship was Sidnie White Crawford, board chair and former president of the institute, who lived and worked at the Albright from 1989 to 1991 on the editions of several Deuteronomy manuscripts from Cave 4, and the Reworked Pentateuch manuscripts, also from Cave 4. The Albright has hosted many scrolls scholars while they pursued their research, including Eugene C. Ulrich (University of Notre Dame), Mark Smith (New York University), and Eileen Schuller (McMaster University). In addition, former fellow and trustee Jodi Magness (University of North Carolina–Chapel Hill) has produced the seminal work on Qumran archaeology in the twenty-first century.

The Albright's excavations at Tel Miqne Ekron was a joint project with the Hebrew University of Jerusalem, and was excavated from 1981 until 1996 under the direction of the Albright's Dorot Director and Professor of Archaeology, Seymour Gitin, and Professor Trude Dothan of the Hebrew University. The excavations discovered the Philistine dedicatory inscription known as the Ekron Royal Dedicatory Inscription.

== Fellowships ==
The institute's international fellowship program fosters a culture of intellectual integrity and respect. It provides an opportunity for students and scholars from all over the world including Israelis and Palestinians to interact and exchange information and ideas in a friendly and convivial environment, which is not duplicated in any other such institution in the region. It also promotes working relationships with related institutions in Israel and the Palestinian Authority. More than 3,000 persons participate in the Albright Institute's annual wide range of programs including lectures, reports, workshops, field trips, and social events. The institute also supports 31 ASOR-affiliated and Albright-assisted excavation, survey, and publications projects.

The Albright awards over $340,000 in grants and fellowships annually. In 2014, 64 Fellows include 34 Fellows with stipends and fee awards, and 30 Associate Senior, Post-Doctoral, and Research Fellows with funding from other sources. The Albright awards three fellowships annually through a grant from the National Endowment for the Humanities. In the academic year 2012–13, the institute initiated the Seymour Gitin Distinguished Professorship, which is open to internationally recognized senior scholars of all nationalities who have made significant contributions to their field of study.

== Albright Live YouTube Channel ==
The institute runs the Albright Live YouTube Channel, which features original content developed by the institute, including lectures, workshops, and other live and recorded content. The includes the series The Shmunis Family Conversations in the Archaeology and History of Ancient Israel with Israel Finkelstein. The series is set up as an interview-style conversation between Albright Institute Director Matthew J. Adams and archaeologist Israel Finkelstein. Overall, 27 episodes covered the rise of Ancient Israel as evidenced by archaeology, ancient Near Eastern textual sources, the Bible, and archaeology from the Late Bronze Age through the Hellenistic Period.

== Meals by Hisham ==
Meals by Hisham is a fundraising program developed by former Director Matthew J. Adams and Albright Chef Hisham M'farreh in response to the closing of the institute during the COVID-19 pandemic. The program features appetizers, dinners, and deserts offered twice weekly for pickup and delivery.

== Notable people ==
=== Directors ===
Long term directors:

- William F. Albright – 1920–29; 1933–36
- Nelson Glueck – 1936–40; 1942–47
- Paul W. Lapp – 1961–65
- William G. Dever – 1971–75
- Albert Glock – 1978–1980
- Seymour Gitin – 1980–2014
- Matthew J. Adams – 2014–2022
- Katharina Schmidt – 2022–2023.
- James Fraser (Archaeologist) – 2023–ongoing

Among the 41 annual directors were

- David Noel Freedman
- Eric M. Meyers

ASOR/Albright past presidents

- James A. Montgomery
- Millar Burrows
- Carl H. Kraeling
- A. Henry Detweiler
- G. Ernest Wright
- Ernest S. Frerichs
- Joe Callaway
- Joe Seger
- Max Miller
- Patty Gerstenblith
- Sidnie White Crawford
- J. Edward Wright
- J.P. Dessel

=== Notable alumni ===
- Cyrus Herzl Gordon
- Baruch Halpern
- Jodi Magness
- Carol Meyers
- Anson Rainey
- Lawrence Stager
- John C. Trever
- Ziony Zevit
- Andrea Berlin

Egyptologist Flinders Petrie lived with his wife at ASOR–Jerusalem in 1933, and died there in 1942.
