= Ekron =

Ancient Philistine city and modern archaeological site in Israel

- עקרון (Hebrew) عقرون (Arabic)
- Tel Miqne/Mikne (Hebrew), Khirbet el-Muqanna (Arabic)
- Location within Israel
- 31.778890°N 34.8499203°E
- Periods: Chalcolithic - Iron Age
- Cultures: Canaanite, Philistine, Israelite
- Location: Israel
- Region: Levant, Israeli coastal plain

Site notes
- Archaeologists: Trude Dothan and Seymour Gitin

Ekron (Philistine: 𐤏𐤒𐤓𐤍 *ʿAqrūn, or *Aqārān Hebrew: עֶקְרוֹן, romanized: ʿEqrōn, Arabic: عقرون, romanized: 'Aqrūn), in the Hellenistic period known as Accaron (Ancient Greek: Ακκαρων, romanized: Akkarōn) was at first a Canaanite, and later more famously a Philistine city, one of the five cities of the Philistine Pentapolis, located in present-day Israel.

In 1957, Ekron was first identified with the mound of Khirbet el-Muqanna (Arabic) or Tel Miqne (Hebrew), near the depopulated Palestinian village of 'Aqir, on the basis of the large size of the Iron Age archaeological remains; the judgement was strengthened by the discovery in 1996 of the Ekron inscription. The tell lies 35 kilometres (22 mi) west of Jerusalem, and 18 kilometres (11 mi) north of Tel es-Safi, the almost certain site of the Philistine city of Gath, on the grounds of Kibbutz Revadim on the eastern edge of the Israeli coastal plain. The other main cities of the Philistine Pentapolis beyond Ekron and Gath were Gaza, Ashkelon, and Ashdod.

== In the Bible ==
In the Hebrew Bible, Ekron is mentioned initially in Joshua 13:2–3:

This is the land that still remains: all the regions of the Philistines and all those of the Geshurites from Shihor, which is east of Egypt, northward to the boundary of Ekron.

Joshua 13:13 counts it the border city of the Philistines and seat of one of the five Philistine city lords, and Joshua 15:11 mentions Ekron's satellite towns and villages. The city was reassigned afterwards to the tribe of Dan (Joshua 19:43), but came again into the full possession of the Philistines. It was the last place to which the Philistines carried the Ark of the Covenant before they sent it back to Israel (1 Samuel 5:10 and 1 Samuel 6:1–8), and the city lords returned here once they had seen that the Ark reached the Israelites in Beth Shemesh (1 Samuel 6:16).

There was a noted sanctuary of Baal at Ekron. The Baal who was worshipped was called Baal Zebub, which some scholars connect with Beelzebub, known from 2 Kings 1:2:

[King] Ahaziah fell through the lattice in his upper chamber at Samaria and was injured. So he sent messengers whom he instructed: "Go inquire of Baal-zebub, the god of Ekron, whether I shall recover from this injury." (JPS translation)

The prophet Elijah repeatedly condemned Ahaziah for turning to Baal-zebub for assurance:

Is it because there is no God in Israel that you are sending to inquire of Baal-Zebub, the god of Ekron? Therefore you shall not come down from the bed to which you have gone up, but you shall surely die.

Ekron's destruction is prophesied in Zephaniah 2:4:

Ekron shall be rooted up.

== Location ==
Jerome wrote that Ekron was to the east of Azotus and Iamnia (consistent with the modern interpretation), however he also mentioned that some equated the city with Straton's Tower at Caesarea Maritima. This may be a reference to Rabbi Abbahu's identification of Ekron with Caesarea in Megillah.

Robinson first identified the Arab village of Aqir as the site of Ekron in 1838, and this was accepted until it was contested by Macalister in 1913, who suggested Khirbet Dikerin, and Albright in 1922, who suggested Qatra.

The identification of Ekron as Tel Miqneh was suggested by Naveh and Kallai in 1957–1958, a theory now widely accepted in light of the Ekron Royal Dedicatory Inscription found during the 1996 excavations.

== History ==
The site of Tel Miqne was lightly occupied beginning in the Chalcolithic period and up to the Early Bronze Age.

=== Middle Bronze IIB ===
After a 400-year gap when only the upper tel was occupied, the city underwent a major expansion c.1600 BCE, under the Canaanites.

In Stratum XI (MB IIB) both the Upper City and Lower City was occupied. Later, the occupation would retreat to the Upper City.

=== Late Bronze ===
The Canaanite city had shrunk in the years before its main public building burned in the 13th century BCE, during the Bronze Age collapse, a period of general devastation associated with the Sea Peoples.

- Ekron Stratum VIII destroyed by fire ending the LBA Canaanite city.

=== Iron Age ===
==== Iron Age I ====
It was re-established by Philistines at the beginning of the Iron Age, c.12th century BCE. During the Iron Age, Ekron was a border city on the frontier contested between Philistia and the kingdom of Judah.

- Ekron Stratum VIIB saw the founding of the Philistine city with Mycenaean IIIC:1 monochrome pottery.

==== Iron Age IIC ====
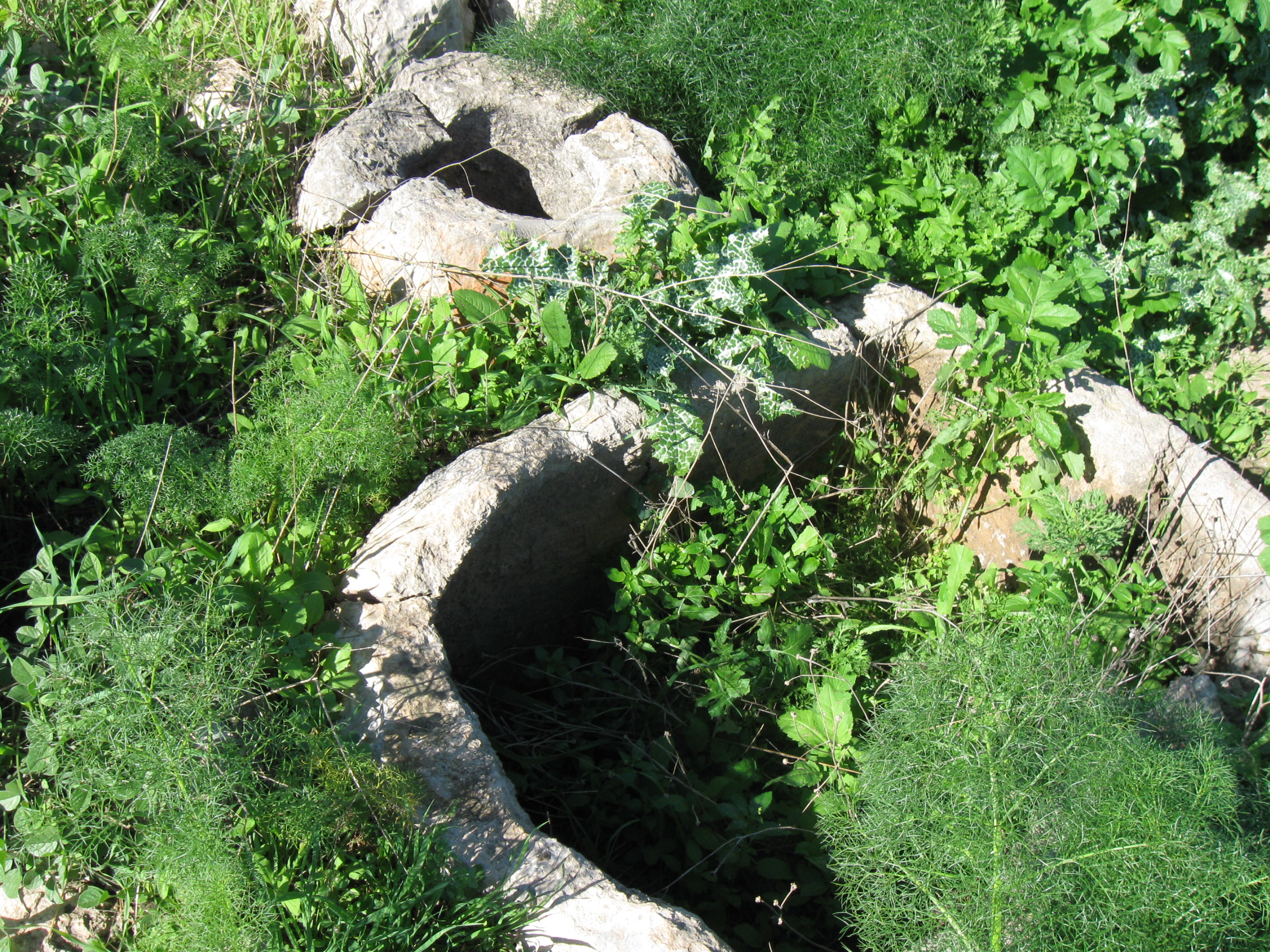
Olive oil press found in Tel Miqne

Records of the Neo-Assyrian Empire also refer to Ekron, as Amqarrūna. The siege of Ekron in 712 BCE is depicted on one of Sargon II's wall reliefs in his palace at Khorsabad, which names the city. Ekron revolted against Sennacherib and expelled Padi (Fadi), his governor, who was sent to Hezekiah, King of Judah, for safe-keeping in Jerusalem. Sennacherib marched against Ekron and the Ekronites called upon the aid of the king of Mutsri from northwest Arabia. Sennacherib turned aside to defeat this army, which he did at Eltekeh, and then returned and took the city by storm, put to death the leaders of the revolt and carried their adherents into captivity. This campaign led to the famous attack of Sennacherib on Hezekiah and Jerusalem, in which Sennacherib compelled Hezekiah to restore Padi, who was reinstated as governor at Ekron. The Philistine city of Ekron is specifically named in the Aramaic stele (Oriental Institute Prism) detailing Sennacherib's exploits in the land of Judah:

The cities of his (i.e. Hezekiah's), which I had despoiled, I cut off from his land and to Mitinti, king of Ashdod, [and to] Padi, king of Ekron, [and to] Silli-bel, king of Gaza, I gave. And (thus) I diminished his land.

Ashdod and Ekron survived to become powerful city-states dominated by the Assyrians in the 7th century BCE. Towards the end of this century, the name of Ekron's king may have been Adon, who wrote a letter known as the Adon Papyrus in Aramaic appealing for help from the pharaoh of Egypt in the face of the approaching forces of the Neo-Babylonian king Nebuchadnezzar II. Apparently it was to no avail, as in 604 BCE the city was destroyed by those forces, and although it is mentioned, as "Accaron", as late as 1 Maccabees 10:89 (2nd century BCE), it was never resettled on a large scale.

An olive oil production center dating from the seventh century BCE discovered at Ekron has over one hundred large olive oil presses, and is the most complete olive oil production center from ancient times to be discovered. The discovery indicates that olive oil production was highly developed in the Levant and that it was a major producer of olive oil for its residents as well as for other parts of the Ancient Near East, such as Egypt and especially Mesopotamia.

== Archaeology ==
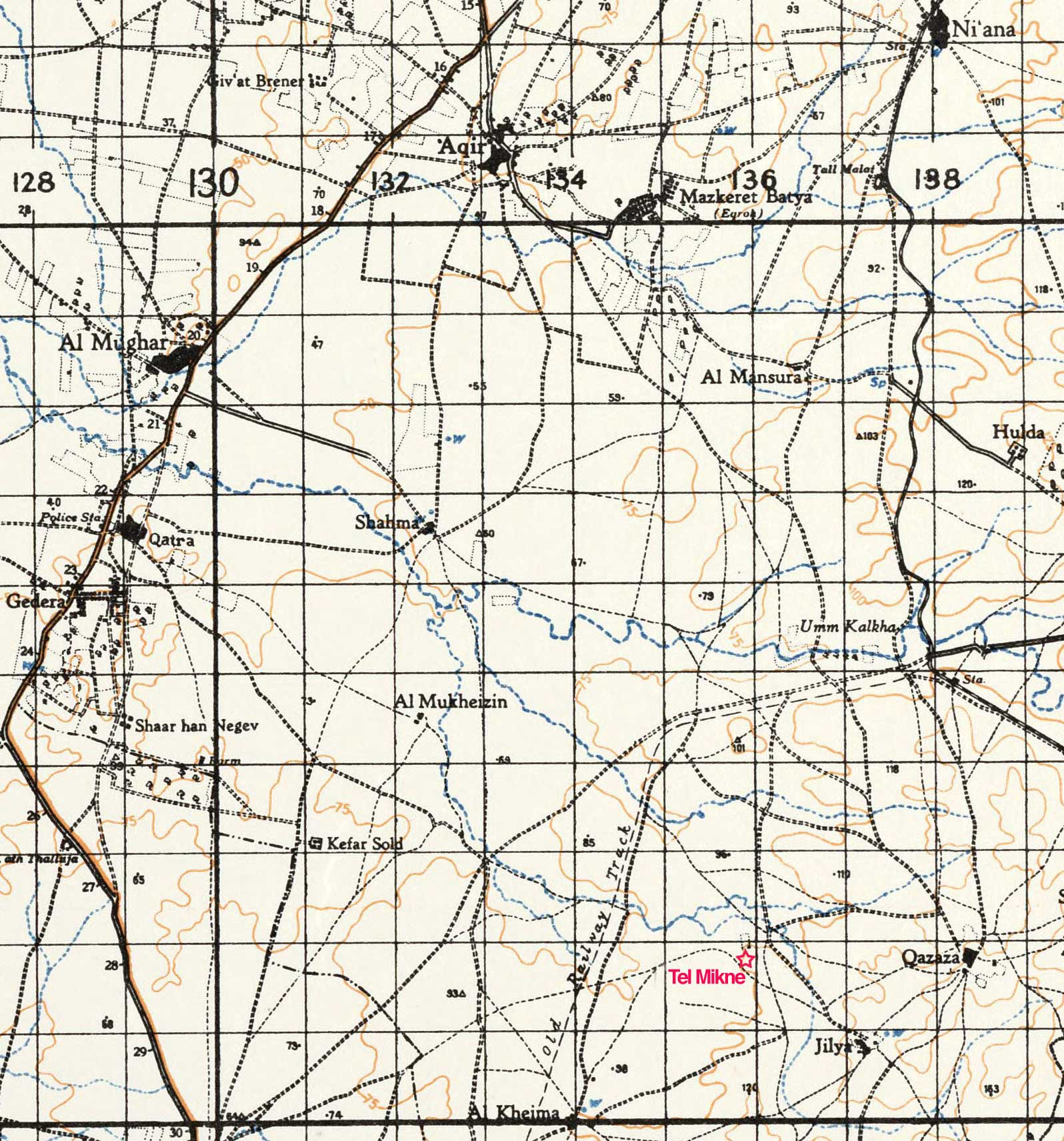
1939 map showing surrounding region

The Tel Miqne excavations were conducted for 14 seasons between 1981 and 1996, sponsored by the Albright Institute of Archaeological Research and the Hebrew University of Jerusalem, under the direction of Trude Dothan and Seymour Gitin. The primary research focus was an interdisciplinary investigation of the interactions between the Philistines, Israelites, Phoenicians, Assyrians, and Egyptians during the Late Bronze Age II, Iron Age I and II.

=== Chronological development ===
The ceramic evidence indicates a presence at the site in the Chalcolithic period and Early Bronze Age. A continuous stratigraphic profile, however, was found only in the upper city on the Northeast Acropolis (Field I), beginning in Stratum XI of the MB IIB and extending through the end of Stratum I of the Iron IIC. In the lower city (Fields II, III, IV, V, X), a 400-year occupational gap followed Stratum XI of the 17th–first half of the 16th century BCE until its resettlement in Stratum VII at the beginning of the Iron I, ca. 1175 BCE. Another occupational gap of ca. 270 years followed the end of Iron I Stratum IV, ca. 975 BCE, in the lower city (Fields II, III, IV, V, X), until it was again resettled in Stratum I of the 7th century BCE. The cities at Ekron were well planned in both the Iron I and Iron II, with four distinct zones of occupation: fortifications, industrial, domestic, and elite. The final Iron II occupation in the 7th/6th centuries BCE was represented by a single architectural unit in Field III in the lower city. A presence in the Roman, Byzantine, and Islamic periods was attested in Fields IV Upper and V.

=== Chronological chart ===
==== Middle Bronze Age ====
The tel was apparently shaped by fortifications that encompassed both the upper and lower cities in the Middle Bronze Age. Monumental platforms, part of the fortification ramparts, were excavated in Fields III and X. MB II ceramic evidence was found throughout the tel, as were fragmentary architectural remains and three infant jar burials excavated in Field IV Lower.

==== Late Bronze Age ====
The unfortified Strata X–VIII settlement was found only in the upper city in Field I on the Northeast Acropolis. It yielded Cypriot and Mycenaean imported pottery and Anatolian Grey burnished ware, attesting to international maritime trade. Egyptian influences are also evident, inter alia, in the burial containing a 19th Dynasty seal and scarab and in the 14th century BCE scarab bearing the name of the Egyptian Pharaoh Amenhotep III and dedicated to the "Lady of the Sycamore Tree," usually associated with the foundations of Egyptian shrines, an heirloom found in a later Iron I phase. The last Canaanite city of Stratum VIII was destroyed in a violent conflagration, dramatically illustrated on the Summit by a severely-burnt storeroom complex that yielded jars containing carbonized grains, lentils, and figs.

==== Iron Age I ====
Stratum VII is characterized by a new material culture with Aegean and Cypriot affinities introduced by the Philistines, one of the Sea Peoples featuring the locally made Philistine 1 (previously designated Mycenaean IIIC:1) pottery. Such pottery is known as Cypriot Bichrome ware, and Philistine Bichrome ware.

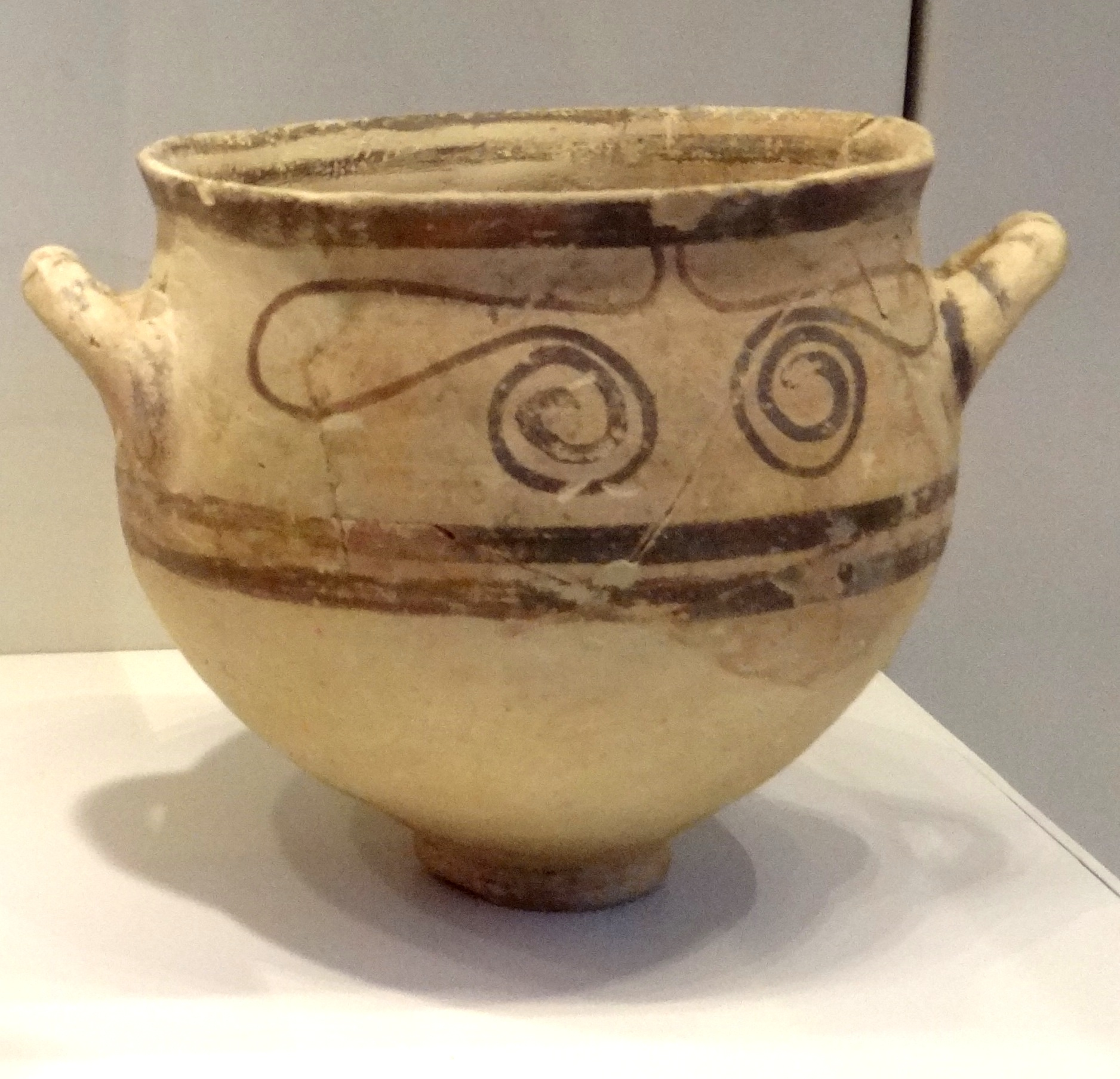
Philistine drinking bowl found in Tel Miqne

In the Strata VI–V Philistine 2 (Bichrome) pottery with red and black decoration on white slip is a major part of the ceramic assemblage. The material culture of Stratum IV is characterized by Philistine 3 (debased) pottery and the influence of a ceramic tradition of predominantly red-slipped and burnished ware.

In the upper city features in Stratum VII, include a mudbrick city wall, megaron-type buildings, hearths, a limestone bathtub, and an industrial kiln area. In Strata VI–V, a major feature was the mudbrick glacis, a cultic room with an incised scapula similar to those found in the 12th and 11th century BCE shrines at Enkomi and Kition on Cyprus.

In the lower city, along the ridge of the southern slope of the tel, behind the Iron I mudbrick city wall of Stratum VI, were a number of architectural units and finds, which included a bull-shaped zoomorphic vessel, an incised ivory tube, and a bronze pin and needle. Stratum V monumental building was constructed on a similar scale as the one in the elite zone. The artifacts, many representing a continuation of Aegean traditions, include a rectangular bone plaque painted in blue and incised with the depiction of the rear of a horse, a Mycenaean-type female figurine, a gold spiral hair-ring, a conical stamp seal depicting two prancing gazelles, an iron knife with an ivory handle, two small pebbled hearths, and two goat skulls.

The domestic buildings continued in use in Stratum IV with no substantial change, and special finds included an incised scapula, similar to those found in the upper city.

Also in the lower city, in the elite zone, Stratum VII was represented by a number of installations, including rectangular hearths. In Stratum VI circular hearths were found in a large public structure, which also produced a round ivory pyxis lid decorated with scenes of animals in battle. In Stratum V, a megaron-type building contained superimposed pebbled hearths, three rooms with benches and bamot, and a monumental entrance hall with two mushroom-shaped stone pillar bases.

One room yielded 20 spherical loom weights in the Aegean tradition. This building also produced three miniature bronze wheels from a cultic stand of a type known from Cyprus and reminiscent of the biblical description of the mechonot (laver stands) and a bronze Janus-faced linchpin from a chariot wheel. Another special find was an iron knife with a pierced spool-shaped ivory handle attached with three bronze nails. In Strata VI and V, the building complex contained a large stone bath, a monolith, two stone pillar bases, and several hearths. In Stratum IV the plan of the building complex was reused and its cultic function continued, as attested by the finds, including a cache of ivory, faience, and stone objects, among them decorated earplugs and a ring depicting the Egyptian goddess Sekhmet. The destruction and abandonment of the Stratum IV lower city during the first quarter of the 10th century marked the end of both the early Philistine city and of the Iron I in general at Ekron.

==== Iron Age II ====
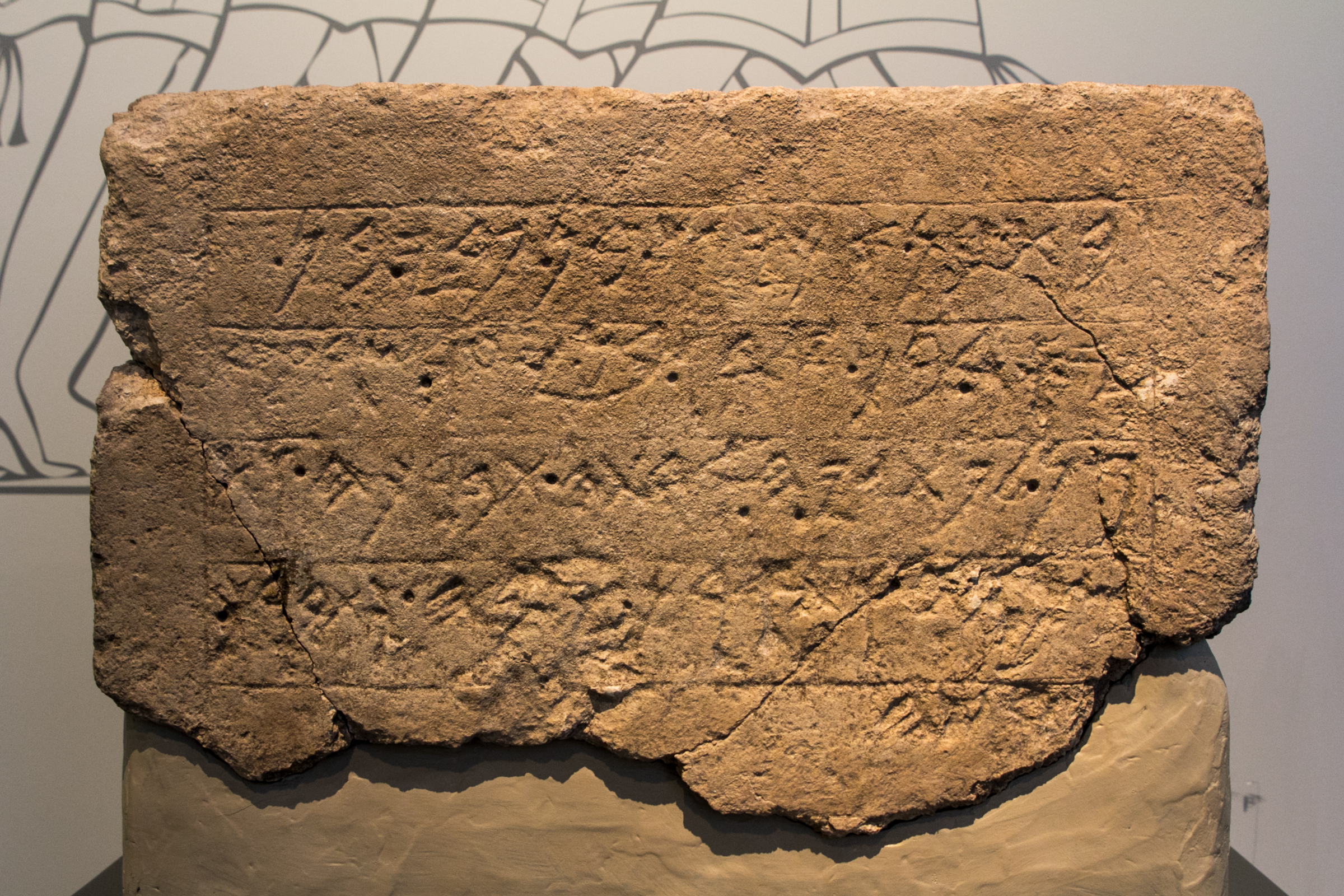
Ekron Royal Dedicatory inscription

Following the destruction of the Iron I Stratum IV city during the first quarter of the 10th century, the lower city was abandoned. Only the upper city was occupied in Strata III–II fortified with a mudbrick city wall and a 7 m-wide (23 ft) mudbrick tower faced with Phoenician-type ashlar masonry in header-and-stretcher construction. Stratum III was continued in the monumental architecture of Stratum IIA–B, with the addition of a series of rooms, probably shops or market stalls, that opened onto the re-paved street, to which a stone-lined central drainage system was added in Stratum IIB.

Both the lower city and the upper city were reoccupied. In the lower city, new fortifications included a city wall and a three-entryway gate protected by a gatehouse, similar to those excavated at Timnah (Tel Batash), Gezer, Lachish, and Ashdod. To the east of the gate, an 80 m-long (260 ft) row of stables or storehouses associated with a large public building was built between the city wall and an outer screening wall. The outstanding feature was the olive oil industrial zone, laid out in a belt extending throughout the lower city along the inner face of the city wall. Special finds include a cache of seven well-preserved large iron agricultural tools and nine four-horned limestone altars.

The 115 oil presses found at Ekron have a production capacity of 500–1,000 tons, making it the largest ancient industrial center for the production of olive oil thus far excavated. In Stratum IB of the last third of the 7th century, the diminution in olive oil production is associated with the end of Assyrian domination in Stratum IC and the expansion of the Egyptian sphere of influence to Philistia ca. 630 BCE. Master suggests the answer is to be found in the rediscovery of an old trade route and the entrance of a new player in the olive oil and wine market, the Ionians. The southern trunk route that connected Egypt by sea to the West lay in disuse for five hundred years, while the northern trunk route functioned as the only major route. Ships that made use of the northern route passed by Ashkelon on their journey to and from Egypt, which of course placed Philistia in an advantageous position viz-a-viz trade with Egypt. However, sometime during the latter part of the 7th century the southern route was rediscovered and the Ionians re-established direct trade connections with Egypt. They soon started to undercut the Philistine oil and wine trade. Lower trade volumes meant lower profit margins and so we see some olive oil presses being decommissioned in the latter part of the 7th century. Ashkelon and Ekron’s full productive capacities were no longer needed.

In the elite zone of the lower city, in Stratum I, the Ekron Royal Dedicatory Inscription, one of the most important finds of the 20th century in Israel, was found in the holy of holies, or cella, a room in the sanctuary of the Temple Complex 650. The inscription mentions Ekron, thus confirming the identification of the site, as well as five of its rulers, including Ikausu (Achish), son of Padi, who built the sanctuary.

The sanctuary reflects a Phoenician design, paralleled in Astarte Temple 1 at Kition on Cyprus. The Ekron Royal Dedicatory Inscription incised on a rectangular-shaped limestone block has five-lines and mentions Ekron, thus confirming the identification of the site, as well as five of its rulers, including Ikausu (Achish), son of Padi, who built the sanctuary to Ptgyh, his lady. Padi and Ikausu are known as kings of Ekron from the 7th century Neo-Assyrian Royal Annals. The language and form of writing of the Ekron inscription show a significant Phoenician influence, and the name Ikausu is understood as "the Achaean" or "the Greek" and Ptgyh has been interpreted as a Greek goddess.

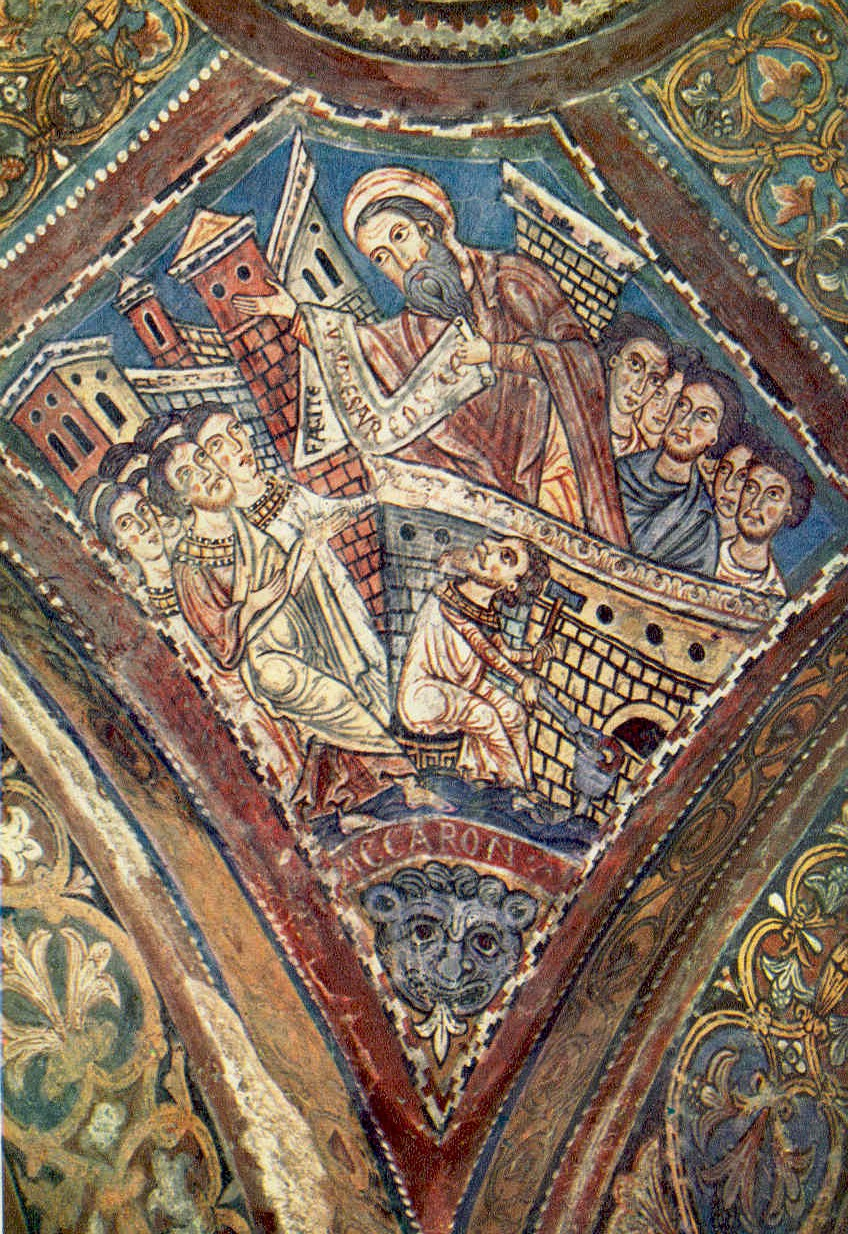
Ekron imagined in a medieval fresco illustrating 1 Samuel 5-6 (Cathedral crypt, Anagni, Italy, ca. 1255)

Other special finds come from the side-rooms of the sanctuary, which yielded a treasure trove of gold, silver, and bronze objects, including a gold cobra (a uraeus), and a unique assemblage of ivories with cultic connotations. The ivories include a depiction of a woman, perhaps a royal personage; a knob bearing the cartouche of the 12th century Pharaoh Ramses VIII; a large head, probably from the top of a harp; and a large object with a male figure on the front, the image of a royal female personage on the side, and a cartouche of the 13th century Pharaoh Merneptah on the back.

The buildings of the elite zone also produced 16 short inscriptions including kdš l’šrt ("dedicated to [the goddess] Asherat"), lmqm ("for the shrine"), and the letter tet with three horizontal lines below it (probably indicating 30 units of produce set aside for tithing), and silver hoards.

The entire Iron II city was destroyed in a violent conflagration during the 604 BCE campaign of the Neo-Babylonian King Nebuchadnezzar II, after which the site was only partially and briefly resettled in the first quarter of the 6th century. A well-preserved Assyrian courtyard-type building was the only remaining architectural evidence for Stratum IA. Thereafter, Ekron was abandoned until the Roman period.

==== Roman to Islamic periods ====
Ekron next appears in the documentary record in 147 BCE, during the Hellenistic period when the region was under Seleucid rule. At that point Alexander Balas, the ruler of the Seleucid Empire, gave Ekron to Jonathan Apphus. Ekron is also mentioned in Eusebius' Onomasticon, a 4th-century gazetteer, in which it was described as a village. There is but fragmentary evidence from the Roman, Byzantine and Islamic periods found only in Fields IV Upper and V.

== See also ==
- Cities of the ancient Near East
- Achish
- Lachish
- Archaeology of Israel
