= Matthew J. Adams =

American archaeologist

Matthew J. Adams is an archaeologist who specializes in the Near East. He earned his degrees at Pennsylvania State University and the University of California, Los Angeles. He served as the director of the Albright Institute of Archaeological Research in Jerusalem (2014–2022), and is the current president of American Archaeology Abroad, Inc. He has worked on several archaeological projects in the past, and is currently director of the Jezreel Valley Regional Project, Co-Director of the Megiddo Expedition along with Israel Finkelstein and Mario Martin, and co-director of the Solomon's Pools Archaeological Project with Mark Letteney.

== Media coverage ==
Adams' work in Tel Megiddo has been extensively covered in the press in relation to Christian eschatological interest in Armageddon. His discoveries at the site of the Roman military camp at Legio has attracted public attention, including the uncovering of a legionary burial.

In 2014, Adams and his colleagues revealed that Megiddo's proto-historic Great Temple contained evidence for mass animal sacrifice and the dawn of urbanization in the Levant. In 2018, excavators led by Adams announced the discovery of an undisturbed Canaanite royal tomb, for the first time in over a century.

== Business affiliations ==
Adams is also the owner of Djehuti Productions, a musical/film production company, and published titles for Harvey Brooks.

He is also co-owner of St. Thomas Liquor Co. (STLC), a family-run commercial real estate company owning and leasing property at St. Thomas in the Virgin Islands.

== Published works ==
=== Monographs and edited volumes ===
- Salvage Excavations at Tel Qashish (Tell Qasis) and Tell el-Wa’er (2010-2013) (ed. with E.C.M. van den Brink, Jezreel Valley Regional Project Studies, 1; Lockwood Press, 2023).
- Egypt and the Mediterranean World from the Late Fourth Through the Third Millennium BCE (ed. with K. Sowada, Journal of Ancient Egyptian Interconnections 37, 2023).
- Transitions during the Early Bronze Age in the Levant: Methodological Problems and Interpretative Perspectives (ed. with V. Roux, Ägypten und Altes Testament, 109; Münster: Zaphon, 2022).
- Movement and Mobility Between Egypt and the Southern Levant in the Second Millennium BCE (ed. with Susan Cohen; Journal of Ancient Egyptian Interconnections 21; 2019).
- Rethinking Israel: Studies in the History and Archaeology of Ancient Israel in Honor of Israel Finkelstein (ed., with Oded Lipschits and Yuval Gadot; Winona Lake, Indiana: Eisenbrauns, 2017).
- The Books of Kings: Sources, Composition, Historiography and Reception (Assoc. Ed., with eds. Baruch Halpern and Andre Lemaire; VTSup, 129; The Formation and Interpretation of Old Testament Literature; Leiden: Brill, 2010)
- From Gods to God: Essays on the Social and Political Dynamics of Cosmologies in the Iron Age by Baruch Halpern (ed.; Forschungen zum Alten Testament, 63; Tübingen: Mohr-Siebeck; 2009).

=== Articles ===
- R. Marom, Y. Tepper, and M.J. Adams, "Al-Lajjun: Forgotten Provincial Capital in Ottoman Palestine," Levant (Published online: 09 May 2023): 1–24.
- M.J. Adams, "The Three Temples in antis at Megiddo," Journal of Ancient Egyptian Interconnections 37 (2023): 17–38.
- R. Kalisher, M.S. Cradic, M.J. Adams, M.A.S. Martin, I. Finkelstein, "Cranial trephination and infectious disease in the Eastern Mediterranean: The evidence from two elite brothers from Late Bronze Megiddo, Israel," PLOS One (22 Feb, 2023).
- R. Shaar, Y. Gallet, Y. Vaknin, L. Gonen, M.A.S. Martin, M.J. Adams, I. Finkelstein, "Archaeomagnetism in the Levant and Mesopotamia Reveals the Largest Changes in the Earth's Geomagnetic Field," Journal of Geophysical Research – Solid Earth (2022): 1–16.
- S.J. Price, M.J. Adams, Y. Tepper, "Lifeways and Settlement Choices at Tell Abu Shusha, Israel: An Integrated Spatial Approach to Survey Archaeology," Archaeological Prospection (2022): 1–15.
- M. Fischer, M.J. Adams, N.L. Ben Ami, and Y. Tepper, "A Fragmentary Sculpture of Victoria from the Legionary Base at Legio," Israel Exploration Journal 72.2 (2022): 238–254.
- L. Sapir-Hen, D.N. Fulton, M.J. Adams, and I. Finkelstein, "Temple and the Town at Early Bronze Age I Megiddo: Faunal Evidence for the Emergence of Complexity" Bulletin of the American Schools of Oriental Research 387 (2022): 1–14.
- I. Finkelstein and M.J. Adams, "The Megiddo Gates: Outdated Views Versus New Data," Tel Aviv 48.2 (2021): 208–212.
- Y. Tepper, W. Eck, G. Leyfirer, and M.J. Adams, "A Roman Military Funerary Inscription from Legio, Israel," Tel Aviv 48.2 (2021): 248–266.
- I. Finkelstein, M.J. Adams, E. Hall, and E. Levy, "The Iron Age Gates of Megiddo: New Evidence and Updated Interpretations," Tel Aviv 46.2 (2019): 167–191.
- M.J. Adams, M. Cradic, Y. Farhi, M. Peers, and Y. Tepper, "A Betyl with a Decorated Base from the Principia of the Roman VIth Ferrata Legionary Base, Legio, Israel," Israel Museum Studies in Archaeology 9 (2019): 68–91.
- V. Linares, M.J. Adams, M.S. Cradic, I. Finkelstein, O. Lipschits, M.A.S. Martin, R. Neumann, C. Spiteri, P.W. Stockhammer, and Y. Gadot, "First Evidence for Vanillin in the Old World: Its Use as Mortuary Offering in Middle Bronze Canaan," Journal of Archaeological Science: Reports 25 (2019): 77–84.
- M.J. Adams, M. Letteney, and M.T.B. Peers, "Survey and Excavations at Solomon's Pools, Palestine: 2018 Preliminary Report," Palestine Exploration Quarterly 151.1 (2019): 15–35.
- I. Finkelstein, M.J. Adams, Z.C. Dunseth, and R. Shahak-Gross, "The Archaeology and History of the Negev and Neighboring Areas in the Third Millennium BCE: A New Paradigm," Tel Aviv 45.1 (2018).
- R. Homsher, M.J. Adams, A. Prins, R. Gardner-Cook, and Y. Tepper, "New Directions with Digital Archaeology and Spatial Analysis in the Jezreel Valley," Journal of Landscape Ecology 10.3 (2017): 154–164.
- M.J. Adams, "The Egyptianized Pottery Cache from Megiddo's Area J: A Foundation Deposit for Temple 4040," Tel Aviv 44.2 (2017): 141–164.
- M.J. Adams, "Djehutihotep and Megiddo in the Early Middle Bronze Age," Journal of Ancient Egyptian Interconnections 13 (2017): 1–11.
- Y. Tepper, J. David, and M.J. Adams, "Excavations at the Camp of the Roman Sixth Ferrata Legion at Legio (el-Lajjun), Israel. A Preliminary Report of the 2013 season," Strata: The Bulletin of the Anglo-Israel Archaeological Society 34 (2016): 87–120.
- D. Langut, M.J. Adams, and I. Finkelstein, "Climate, Settlement Patterns and Olive Horticulture in the Southern Levant during the Early Bronze and Intermediate Bronze Ages (ca. 3600–1950 BCE)," Levant 48.2 (July 2016): 1–18.
- R.S. Homsher; B. L. Drake; Y. Tepper; M. J. Adams; J. K. David (2016). "From the Bronze Age to the 'Lead Age'. Observations on Sediment Analyses at Two Archaeological Sites in the Jezreel Valley, Israel: the Roman Camp at Legio and the Early Bronze Age Village at Tel Megiddo East" (PDF). Mediterranean Archaeology & Archaeometry. 16 (1): 187–204. doi:10.5281/zenodo.35533.
- A. Prins, M.J. Adams, M. Ashley, R.S. Homsher, "Digital Archaeological Fieldwork and the Jezreel Valley Regional Project, Israel," Near Eastern Archaeology 77:3 (2014): 196–201.
- M.J. Adams, J. David, R. Homsher, M.E. Cohen, "New Evidence for the Rise of a Complex Society in the Late Fourth Millennium at Tel Megiddo East in the Jezreel Valley," Near Eastern Archaeology 77:1 (2014): 32–43.
- M.J. Adams, I. Finkelstein and D. Ussishkin, "The Great Temple of Early Bronze I Megiddo," American Journal of Archaeology 118.2 (2014): 1–21.
- J. Pincus, T. DeSmet, Y. Tepper, and M.J. Adams, "Ground Penetrating Radar and Electromagnetic Archaeogeophysical Investigations at the Roman Legionary Camp at Legio, Israel," Archaeological Prospection 20.3 (2013): 1–13.
