= Seymour Gitin =

American Archeologist

- Born: 1936 (age 89–90)

Academic background
- Education: University at Buffalo (BA, 1956); HUC-JIR (BAHL, 1959); HUC-JIR (MAHL, 1962); HUC-JIR (PhD, 1980)
- Thesis: 'A Ceramic Typology of the Late Iron II, Persian, and Hellenistic Periods at Tell Gezer' (1980)

Academic work
- Discipline: Archaeology
- Sub-discipline: Syro-Palestinian archaeology; Biblical archaeology
- Institutions: Brandeis University; Albright Institute of Archaeological Research
- Notable works: Excavations at Tel Miqne-Ekron

Seymour Gitin (born 1936) is an American archaeologist specializing in ancient Israel, known for his excavations at Tel Miqne-Ekron. He was the director of the Albright Institute of Archaeological Research (AIAR) in Jerusalem from 1980 to 2014.

== Early life and education ==
Gitin attended the University at Buffalo, earning a Bachelor of Arts in ancient history in 1956. He then went on to the Hebrew Union College-Jewish Institute of Religion (HUC-JIR) in Cincinnati, Ohio, where he received a bachelor of arts in Hebrew Letters in 1959 and a master of arts in Hebrew Letters and Rabbinic Ordination in 1962. During this period, Gitin spent a year studying at the Hebrew University of Jerusalem, where he took a course in archaeology taught by Yigael Yadin, and subsequently had his first field experience, working with Nelson Glueck on an archaeological survey of the western Negev. He also played the lead role in I Like Mike (1961), an Israeli film directed by Peter Frye.

From 1962 to 1964, Gitin served as a chaplain in the United States Air Force, stationed in Anchorage, Alaska. He then worked as a rabbi for two congregations in Southern California. From 1968 to 1970, he was the director of admissions at his alma mater HUC-JIR, during which time he entered the doctoral program in archaeology under the supervision of Nelson Glueck. In 1970, he returned to Israel to continue his studies under the supervision of William G. Dever, taking courses at the Hebrew University. Subsequently, he served as coordinator and then director of the Gezer publications project at the Nelson Glueck School of Biblical Archaeology in Jerusalem, as well as a senior lecturer and curator at the Glueck Museum at HUC-JIR Jerusalem. From 1979 to 1982, he was an adjunct professor at Brandeis University, and also the director of the joint Brandeis–ASOR archaeological programme in Israel.

In 1980, Gitin completed his doctoral dissertation, A Ceramic Typology of the Late Iron II, Persian, and Hellenistic Periods at Tell Gezer, and was awarded a PhD in Syro-Palestinian archaeology by HUC-JIR. From 1997 to 1998, he held a fellowship at the Katz Center for Advanced Judaic Studies.

== Albright Institute ==
In 1980, Gitin became the director of the Albright Institute of Archaeological Research (AIAR) in Jerusalem.

While at AIAR, Gitin and Trude Dothan directed excavations at the Philistine city of Tel Miqne-Ekron, conducting 14 seasons between 1981 and 1996. Gitin's research at Ekron demonstrated that, contrary to the previous scholarly consensus, the Philistines flourished in the Eastern Mediterranean littoral until the late 7th century BCE, extending their documented history by 400 years. He also showed that the extensive olive oil industry at Ekron in the 7th century BCE, the largest production complex of its kind in antiquity excavated to date, was the direct result of Ekron coming under the control of the Neo-Assyrian Empire. Based on the late Philistine sequence at Ekron, he has argued that the disappearance of the Philistines following the destruction of their cities by the Neo-Babylonian Empire can be explained as the result of a process of acculturation.

The most significant find of the Tel Miqne excavations is the 7th century BCE Ekron royal dedicatory inscription, in which the name of the city is mentioned, confirming the identification of Tel Miqne with biblical Ekron. The inscription also contained a list of five of the kings of Ekron, two of whom are mentioned in the Neo-Assyrian Royal Annals of the late 8th and 7th centuries BCE. This makes the inscription one of the primary documents for establishing the chronology of events relating to the end of the late biblical period, especially the history of the Philistines. Gitin and Dothan are finishing the preparation of the materials from 14 seasons of excavation at Ekron for publication.

== Awards ==
- Distinguished Alumni Award, University at Buffalo (1998)
- Honorary doctorate, Hebrew Union College-Jewish Institute of Religion (2003)
- Percia Schimmel Award for Distinguished Contribution to Archaeology in Eretz-Israel and the Lands of the Bible, Israel Museum (2004)
- A festschrift in Gitin's honor was published by AIAR and the Israel Exploration Society in 2007
- P. E. Macallister Field Archaeology Award, ASOR (2009)
- The Seymour Gitin Distinguished Professorship was established as an endowed chair at AIAR in 2012–2013

== Selected publications ==
=== Monographs ===
- 1990 Gezer III: A Ceramic Typology of the Late Iron II, Persian and Hellenistic Periods at Tell Gezer, Text and Data Base and Plates, Vol. III author, Annual of the Nelson Glueck School of Biblical Archaeology, Jerusalem: Hebrew Union College ISBN 965222202X
- 2006 Tel-Miqne Ekron Excavations, 1995–96 Field INE East Slope: Iron Age I (Early Philistine Period) author with M. Meehl and T. Dothan, and editor, and contributions by A. Zukerman, L. Mazow, A. de Vincenz, D. Ben Shlomo and J. Lev-Tov, Ekron Final Field Report Series 8, Jerusalem: Albright Institute and Hebrew University.
- 2012 Tel Miqne-Ekron Excavations, 1985–1995, Field IVNE/NW (Lower): The Elite Zone, Iron Age I–II, author with Y. Garfinkel, and T. Dothan, and editor, with contributions by A. Zukerman, David Ben-Shlomo, Alexandra S. Drenka, Amir G, Baruch Brandl, J.P. Dessel, Ianir Milevsky, Edward F. Maher, Laura Mazow, Brian Hesse, Omri Lernau, Dalet Regev, Jay Rosenberg, Eric Steinbach, and Kathleen Wheeler, Ekron Final Field Report Series 9/1, 9/ 2, 9/3A, 9/3B, Jerusalem: Albright Institute and Hebrew University (in press).

=== Articles ===
- 1989a Tel Miqne-Ekron: A Type Site for the Inner Coastal Plain in the Iron II Period. Annual of the American Schools of Oriental Research 49:23–58, figs:15–22.
- 1989b Incense Altars from Ekron, Israel and Judah: Context and Typology. pp.*52–67 in Eretz-Israel 20 (Yadin Memorial Volume), Jerusalem: Israel, Exploration Society.
- 1997a The Neo-Assyrian Empire and its Western Periphery: The Levant, with a Focus on Philistine Ekron. pp. 77–104 in ASSYRIA 1995, 10th Anniversary Symposium of the Neo-Assyrian Text Corpus Project, Helsinki, eds. S. Parpola and R.M. Whiting, Helsinki: University of Helsinki.
- 1997b A Royal Dedicatory Inscription from Ekron. (with T. Dothan and J. Naveh), Israel Exploration Journal 47/1–2:1–16.
- 2001 The Tel Miqne-Ekron Silver Hoards: The Assyrian and Phoenician Connections (with A. Golani). pp. 25–45 in Hacksilber to Coinage, ed. M. Balmuth, New York: American Numismatic Society.
- 2002 The Four-Horned Altar and Sacred Space: An Archaeological Perspective. pp. 95–123 in Sacred Time, Sacred Space (Archaeology and the Religion of Israel), ed. B.M. Gittlen, Winona Lake, Indiana: Eisenbrauns.
- 2003 Israelite and Philistine Cult and the Archaeological Record in Iron Age II: The `Smoking Gun’ Phenomenon. pp. 279–295 in Symbiosis, Symbolism and the Power of the Past: Canaan, Ancient Israel and their Neighbors, Proceedings Volume of the AIAR/ASOR Centennial Symposium, May, 2000, Jerusalem, eds. W.G. Dever and S. Gitin, Winona Lake, Indiana: Eisenbrauns.
- 2012 Temple Complex 650 at Ekron: The Impact of Multi-Cultural Influences on Philistine Cult in the Late Iron Age.” In Temple Building and Temple Cult: Architecture and Cultic Paraphernalia of Temples in the Levant (2.-1. Mill. B.C.E.), ed. J. Kamlah, Abhandlung des Deutschen Palästina-Vereins 41Tübingen: Wiesbaden:Harrassowitz.

=== Chapters in edited volumes ===
- 2001 Miqne (Tel; Muqanna, Khirbet el-). (with T. Dothan). pp. 339–340 in Archaeological Encyclopedia of the Holy Land, eds. A. Negev and S. Gibson (revised and updated edition), New York: Continuum Publishing Group.
- 2008 Miqne, Tel (Ekron). (with T. Dothan). pp. 1952–1958 in The New Encyclopedia of Archaeological Excavations in the Holy Land, 5, Supplementary Volume, ed. E. Stern, Jerusalem: Israel Exploration Society.
- 2010 The Philistines,” pp. 301–364, Chapter IV.A.4 in the Book of Kings:Sources, Composition, Historiography and Reception, eds. A. Lemaire and B. Halpern, Leiden: Brill.
