= Ekron Royal Dedicatory Inscription =

Philistine inscription

Ekron inscription
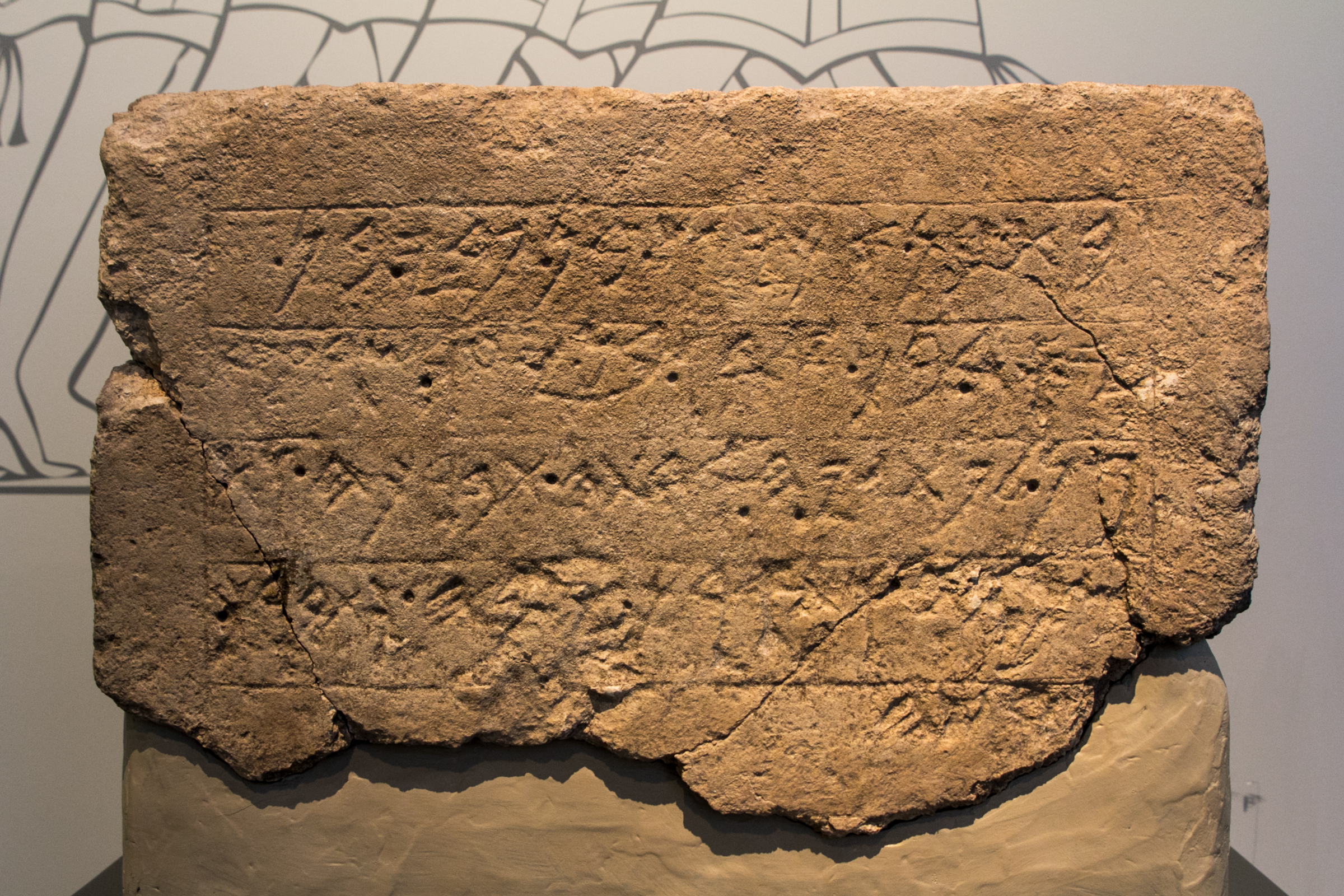
- The inscription in its current location
- Material: Limestone
- Size: H: 39; W: 60; D: 26 cm
- Writing: Phoenician alphabet
- Created: first half of the 7th century BCE
- Discovered: 1996
- Present location: Israel Museum
- Identification: IAA 1997-2912

The Ekron Royal Dedicatory Inscription, or simply the Ekron inscription, is a royal dedication inscription found in its primary context, in the ruins of a temple during the 1996 excavations of Ekron, Israel. It is known as KAI 286.

It is incised on a rectangular-shaped limestone block with five lines and 71 characters, and mentions Ekron, thus confirming the identification of the site, as well as five of its rulers, including Ikausu (Achish), son of Padi, who built the sanctuary. Padi and Ikausu are known as kings of Ekron from the late 8th- and 7th-century Neo-Assyrian Royal Annals, such as the Annals of Sennacherib and Esarhaddon. King Padi is mentioned in connection to events from the years 701 and 699 BC, King Ikausu about 673 and 667 BC, placing the date of the inscription firmly in the first half of the 7th century BC, and most likely in the second quarter of that century.

It is the first connected body of text to be identified as "Philistine", based on Ekron's identification as a Philistine city in the Bible (see Joshua 13:3 and 1 Samuel 6:17). However, it is written in a northern Canaanite dialect similar to Phoenician and Old Byblian, such that its discoverers referred to it as "something of an enigma".

== Discovery ==
The inscription was discovered in the Albright Institute of Archaeological Research Tel Miqne excavations of Ekron led by Seymour Gitin and Trude Dothan.

The inscription is one of the primary documents for establishing the chronology of events relating to the end of the late biblical period, especially a possible late history of the Philistines. The inscription has therefore been referred to as one of the most important archaeological finds of the 20th century in Israel.

== Translation ==
The text is written from right-to-left in a style and dialect similar to Phoenician inscriptions from Byblos. It has been transcribed, translated, and transliterated as:

𐤟𐤁𐤕𐤟𐤁𐤍𐤟𐤀𐤊𐤉𐤔𐤟𐤁𐤍𐤟𐤐𐤃𐤉𐤟𐤁𐤍
bt·bn·ʾkyš·bn·pdy·bn·
Bit banâ ʾAkayuš bin Padî bin
(The) temple built by Achish, son of Padi, son of

𐤉𐤎𐤃𐤟𐤁𐤍𐤟𐤀𐤃𐤀𐤟𐤁𐤍𐤟𐤉𐤏𐤓𐤟𐤔𐤓𐤏𐤒
ysd·bn·ʾdʾ·bn·yʿr·šrʿq
Yasad bin ʾAdāʾ bin Yaʿar šar ʿAqqa-
Yasid, son of Ada, son of Ya'ir, ruler of Ek-

𐤓𐤍𐤟𐤋𐤐𐤕[ ]𐤉𐤄𐤟𐤀𐤃𐤕𐤄𐤟𐤕𐤁𐤓𐤊𐤄𐤟𐤅𐤕
rn·lpt[ ]yh·ʾdth·tbrkh·wt
-run laPT[ ]YH ʾadāttô tabarrikihu watti-
ron, for PT[ ]YH his lady, may she bless him, and pro-

𐤟𐤔𐤌⸢𐤓⸣𐤄𐤟𐤅𐤕𐤀𐤓𐤊𐤟𐤉𐤌𐤄𐤟𐤅𐤕𐤁𐤓𐤊
šm⸢r⸣h·wtʾrk·ymh·wtbrk·
-šmu[ri]hu wataʾarik yamēhu watabarik
-t[ect] him, and prolong his days, and bless

𐤀⸣𐤓⸢𐤑⸣𐤄⸣
⸢ʾ⸣r⸢ṣ⸣h
[ʾa]r[ṣ]ô
his [la]n[d]

== Interpretation ==
The language and writing style of the Ekron inscription show significant Phoenician influence, and the name ʾkyš is understood as Achish.

The inscription contains a list of five of the kings of Ekron, fathers to sons: Ya'ir, Ada, Yasid, Padi, and Achish, and the name of the goddess pt[ ]yh to whom the temple is dedicated. Padi and Achish (as "Ikausu") are mentioned in the Neo-Assyrian Royal Annals, which provide the basis for dating their reigns to the late 8th and 7th centuries BCE.

The inscription also securely identified the site by mentioning the name Ekron.

The identity of pt[ ]yh has been subject to scholarly debate, with the third letter being:

- a very small gimel, giving ptgyh, which could be a previously unknown deity,
- a resh, giving ptryh for Pidray the daughter of Baal,
- a nun, giving ptnyh,
- no letter at all, giving ptyh

== Other inscriptions from Ekron ==
The excavations also produced 16 short inscriptions including kdš l’šrt ("dedicated to [the goddess] Asherat"), lmqm ("for the shrine"), and the letter tet with three horizontal lines below it (probably indicating 30 units of produce set aside for tithing), and silver hoards.
