= Aqir =

Aqir 'Aqr, Akir, Akkur
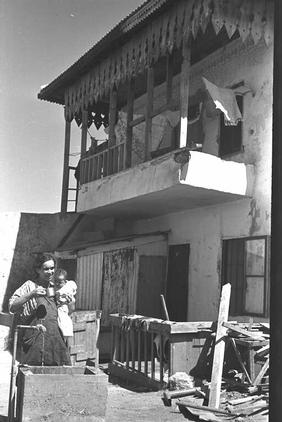
- Palestinian house in Aqir, post 1948
- Etymology: Barren
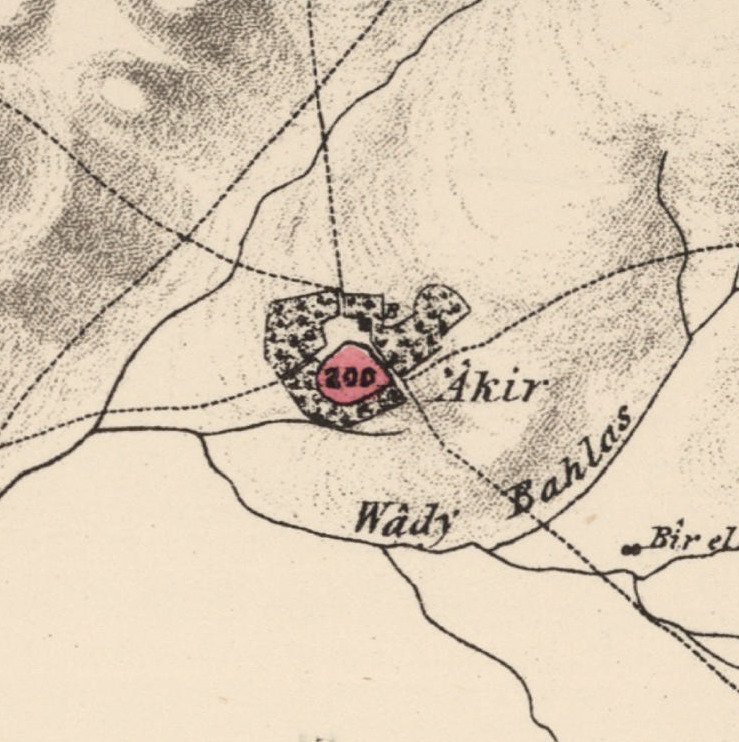
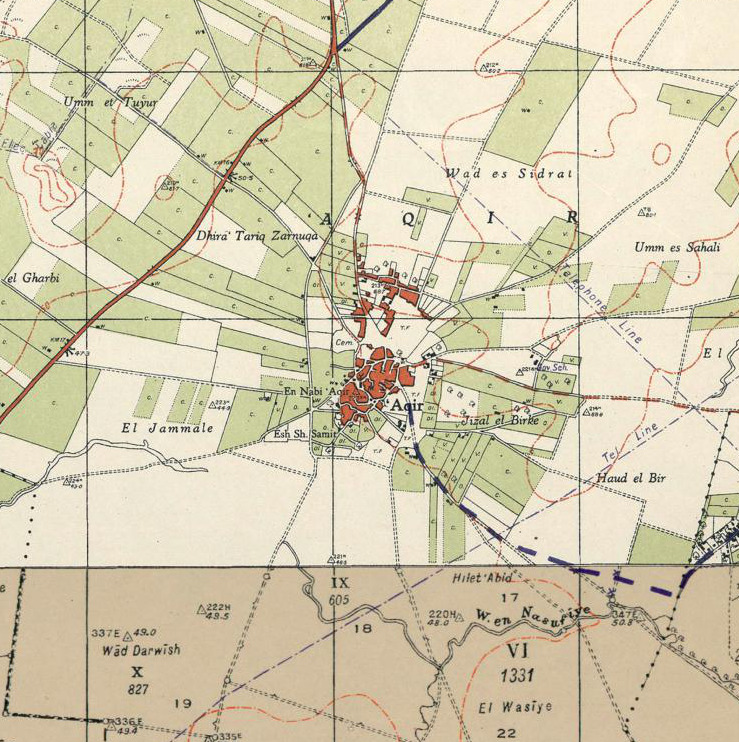
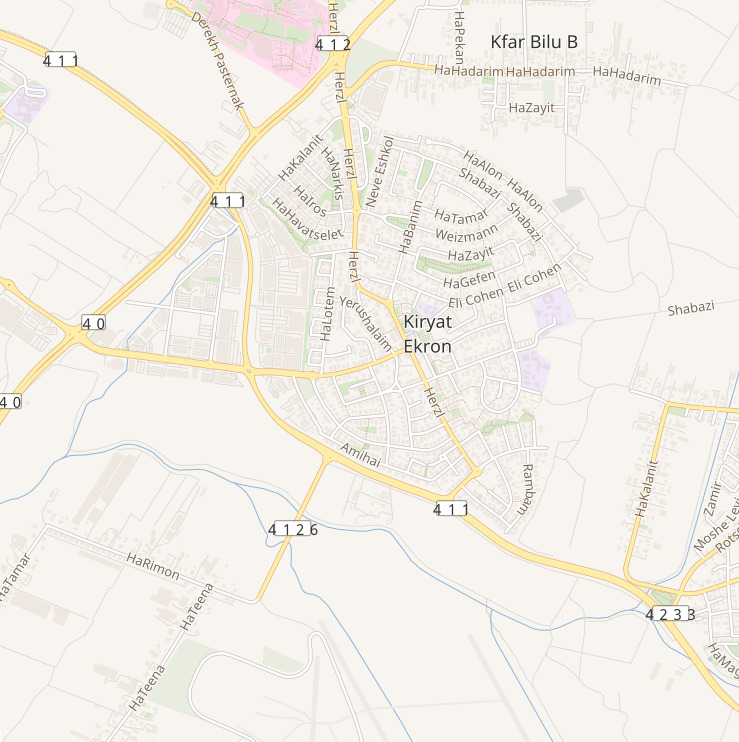
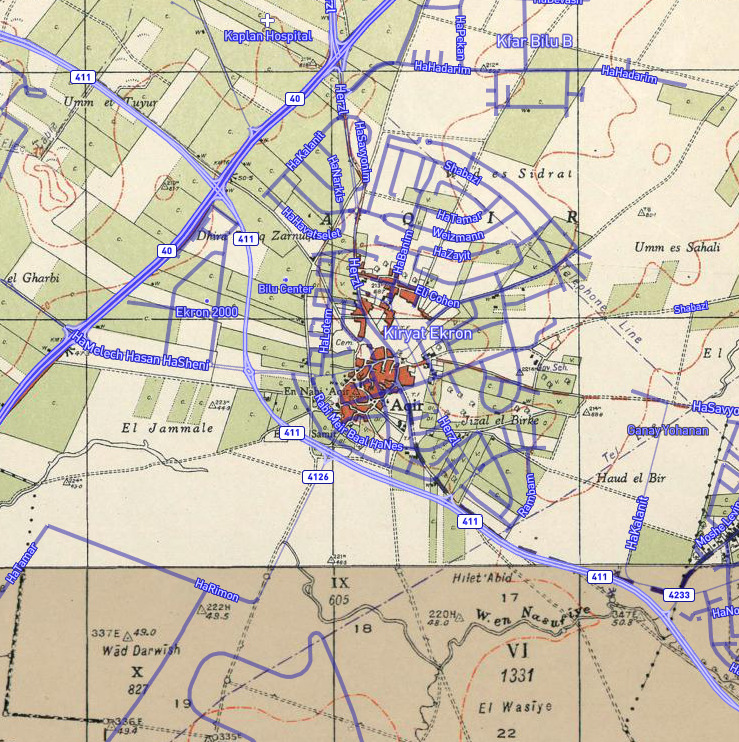
- 1870s map 1940s map modern map 1940s with modern overlay map A series of historical maps of the area around Aqir (click the buttons)

- Location within Mandatory Palestine
- Coordinates: 31°51′34″N 34°49′15″E
- Palestine grid: 133/140
- Geopolitical entity: Mandatory Palestine
- Subdistrict: Ramle
- Date of depopulation: 6 (??) May 1948

Area
  - Total: 11,322 dunams (11.322 km^{2}; 4.371 sq mi)

Population (1945)
  - Total: 2,480
- Cause(s) of depopulation: Military assault by Yishuv forces
- Current Localities: Kiryat Ekron, Mazkeret Batya Ganei Yohanan

Aqir, also spelt 'Aqr, Akir and Akkur, was a Palestinian Arab village in the Ramle Subdistrict, located 9 km southwest of Ramla and 1 km north of Wadi al-Nasufiyya (today called Nahal Ekron). It was depopulated and demolished and replaced by Kiryat Ekron.

== History ==
Until the early 20th century, Aqir was thought to lie at the site of the ancient Philistine city of Ekron ('Aqrūn), that has now been identified as Tel Mikne, 9 km to the south. The error seems rooted in antiquity; The Romans referred to the village as Accaron.

Archeological excavations indicate that a pottery workshop operated there during the Roman era, and a glass workshop was there during the Byzantine era. Buildings from the Abbasid era have also been excavated.

In the 10th century, Al-Muqaddasi writes of Aqir (Ekron) as "A large village with a mosque. Its inhabitants are much given to good works. The bread here is not to be surpassed for quality. The village lies on the high road from Ar-Ramlah to Makka." Yakut called it Al Akir, and said it belonged to Ar Ramlah.

The village mosque had a construction text in naskhi script from 1296–7 CE.

=== Ottoman era ===
In 1596, Aqir (Amir) appeared in Ottoman tax registers as being in the Nahiya of Ramla of the Liwa of Gaza. It had a population of 31 Muslim households and paid taxes on wheat, barley, and other produce.

The mihrab in the mosque had an inscription above it dating it to 1701-1702 CE.

The scholar Edward Robinson passed by the village in 1838, and described it as being surrounded by "well-tilled gardens and fields of the richest soil". The village itself was described as being of "considerable size", built of bricks or adobe. It was further noted that it was a Muslim village, located in the Ramleh region.

In the 19th century, Aqir received Egyptian migrants.

In 1857 William McClure Thomson described the village as a "forlorn cluster of low earth-roofed hovels" and "though the village itself is squalid and the people rude, the wide valley below it is extremely fertile"

In 1863 Victor Guérin noted Aqir as a large village, with 800 inhabitants. An Ottoman village list from about 1870 counted 155 houses and a population of 512, though the population count included men only.

In the mid 1870s Claude Reignier Conder described Aqir as "a mud hamlet, with gardens fenced with prickly pears"

In 1882, the PEF's Survey of Western Palestine described it as "an adobe village on low rising ground, with cactus hedges surrounding its gardens, and a well to the north."

Excavations revealed Late Ottoman infant jar-burials associated with nomads or itinerant workers of Egyptian origins.

=== British Mandate era ===
At the time of the 1922 census of Palestine, Aqir had a population of 1155 inhabitants, all Muslims. This had increased to 1689 Muslims and 2 Christians by the 1931 census.

Between 1941 and 1948, the RAF Aqir airfield was located nearby. In 1945, the village had a population of 2,480 Muslims with two elementary schools: one for boys, founded in 1921 which had an enrollment of 391 boys in 1945 and a second for girls, which had an enrollment of 46 girls in 1945. There were two mosques in the village.

In the 1945 statistics, the village had 1,300 dunums of land used for citrus and banana cultivation, 8,968 dunums were used for cereals, 914 dunums irrigated or used for orchards, while 46 dunams were classified as built-up public areas.

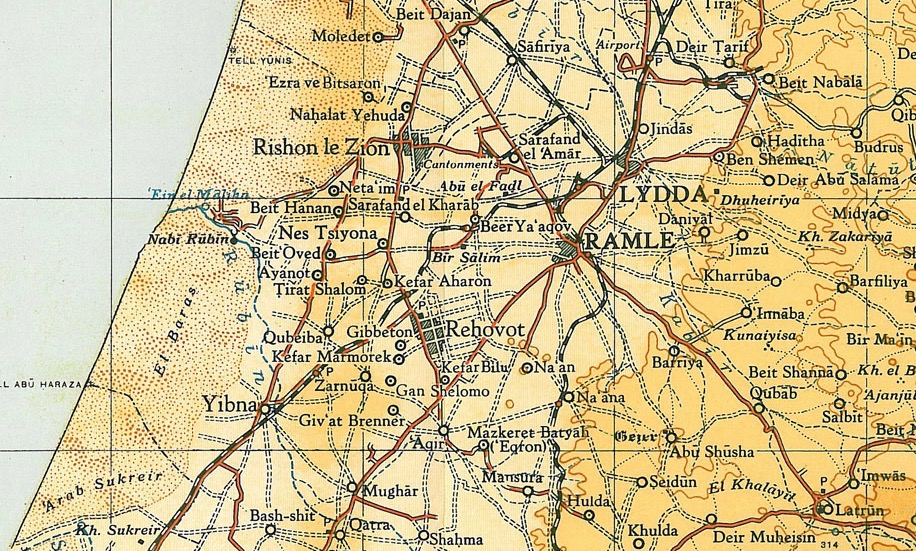
Aqir 1945 1:250,000

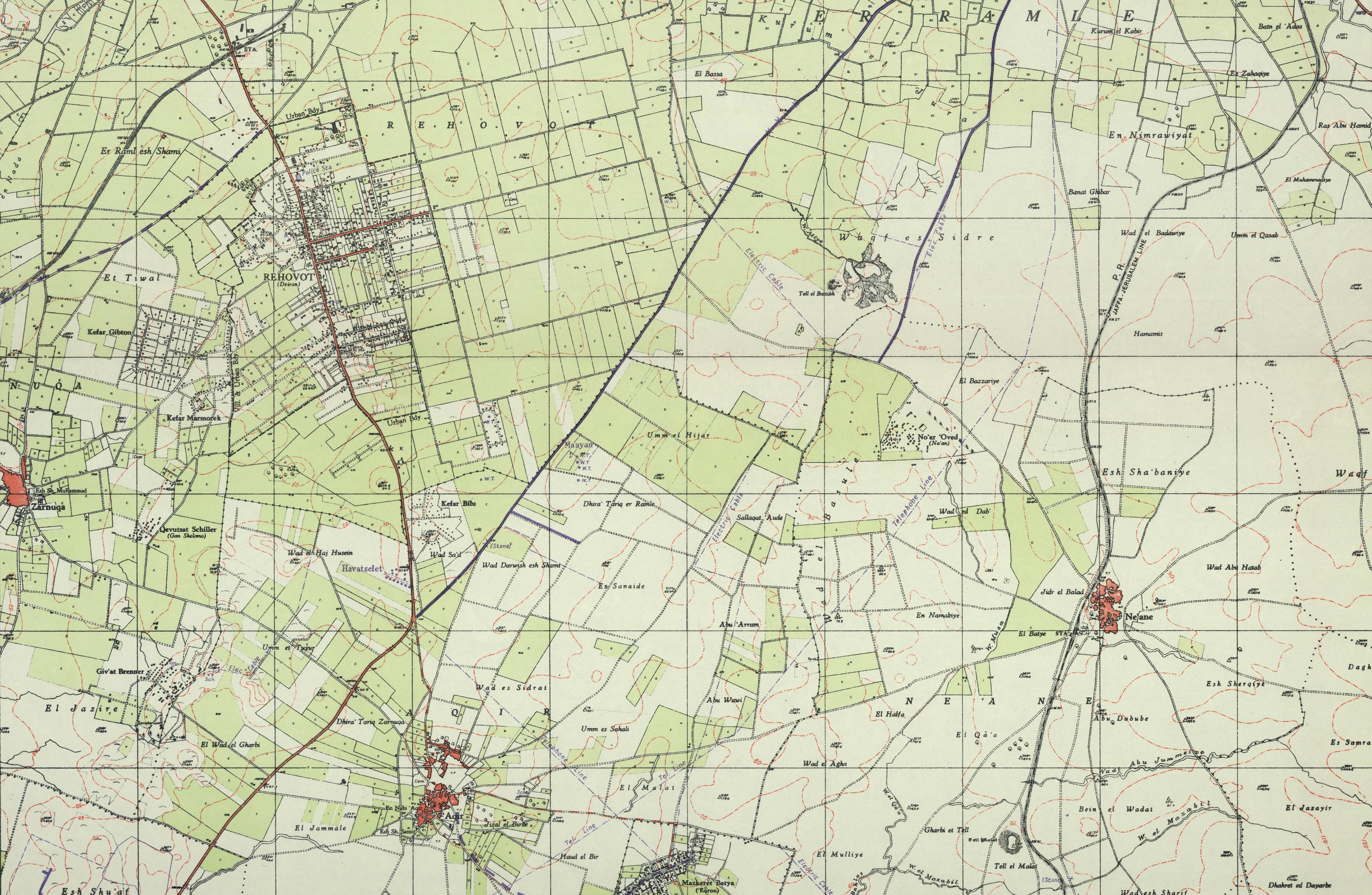
Aqir 1948 1:20,000

=== 1948 and afterward ===
The village was depopulated during the 1947–48 Civil War in Mandatory Palestine on 6 May 1948 during Operation Barak by the Givati Brigade. The remaining village houses were taken over by Kiryat Ekron soon after.

According to the Palestinian historian Walid Khalidi, the village's remaining structures on the village land were, in 1992:

A number of small houses remain, several of which are occupied by Jewish families. One is a cement house with a gabled roof and rectangular doors and windows, another is similar in its features, but its roof is flat. Cypresses, cycamores and cactuses grow on the site. The surrounding lands are cultivated by Israelis.

== Bibliography ==
- Barron, J.B., ed. (1923). Palestine: Report and General Abstracts of the Census of 1922. Government of Palestine.
- Conder, C.R.; Kitchener, H.H. (1882). The Survey of Western Palestine: Memoirs of the Topography, Orography, Hydrography, and Archaeology. Vol. 2. London: Committee of the Palestine Exploration Fund.
- Department of Statistics (1945). Village Statistics, April, 1945. Government of Palestine.
- Guérin, V. (1869). Description Géographique Historique et Archéologique de la Palestine (in French). Vol. 1: Judee, pt. 2. Paris: L'Imprimerie Nationale.
- Hadawi, S. (1970). Village Statistics of 1945: A Classification of Land and Area ownership in Palestine. Palestine Liberation Organization Research Centre. Archived from the original on 2018-12-08.
- Hartmann, M. (1883). "Die Ortschaftenliste des Liwa Jerusalem in dem türkischen Staatskalender für Syrien auf das Jahr 1288 der Flucht (1871)". Zeitschrift des Deutschen Palästina-Vereins. 6: 102–149.
- Hütteroth, W.-D.; Abdulfattah, K. (1977). Historical Geography of Palestine, Transjordan and Southern Syria in the Late 16th Century. Erlanger Geographische Arbeiten, Sonderband 5. Erlangen, Germany: Vorstand der Fränkischen Geographischen Gesellschaft. ISBN 3-920405-41-2.
- Khalidi, W. (1992). All That Remains:The Palestinian Villages Occupied and Depopulated by Israel in 1948. Washington D.C.: Institute for Palestine Studies. ISBN 0-88728-224-5.
- Marmelstein, Yitzhak (2016-07-28). "'Aqir" (128). Hadashot Arkheologiyot – Excavations and Surveys in Israel.
- Mills, E., ed. (1932). Census of Palestine 1931. Population of Villages, Towns and Administrative Areas. Jerusalem: Government of Palestine.
- Morris, B. (2004). The Birth of the Palestinian Refugee Problem Revisited. Cambridge University Press. ISBN 978-0-521-00967-6.
- Al-Muqaddasi, 1884, Description of Syria, including Palestine translated by Le Strange
- Palmer, E.H. (1881). The Survey of Western Palestine: Arabic and English Name Lists Collected During the Survey by Lieutenants Conder and Kitchener, R. E. Transliterated and Explained by E.H. Palmer. Committee of the Palestine Exploration Fund.
- Raʿad, Basem L. (2019). "Palestine's History and Heritage Narrative: Alternative Prospects". Bethlehem University Journal. 36: 77-100.
- Robinson, E.; Smith, E. (1841). Biblical Researches in Palestine, Mount Sinai and Arabia Petraea: A Journal of Travels in the year 1838. Vol. 3. Boston: Crocker & Brewster.
- Sharon, M. (1997). Corpus Inscriptionum Arabicarum Palaestinae, A. Vol. 1. BRILL. ISBN 90-04-10833-5.
- Socin, A. (1879). "Alphabetisches Verzeichniss von Ortschaften des Paschalik Jerusalem". Zeitschrift des Deutschen Palästina-Vereins. 2: 135–163.
- Strange, le, G. (1890). Palestine Under the Moslems: A Description of Syria and the Holy Land from A.D. 650 to 1500. Committee of the Palestine Exploration Fund.
