= Palestinian Rural History Project =

Palestinian Rural History Project

The Palestinian Rural History Project (PRHP) is an ethnographic fieldwork and oral history preservation initiative with a focus on Palestinian rural history and heritage since the Late Ottoman period (–1917), through the British Mandate period (1918–1948) and beyond. The PRHP is the largest rural-history archive of Palestinian rural history and possesses the widest spatial coverage of the southern Levant. It is curated by Roy Marom.

Palestinian historian Beshara Doumani, stressed the importance of oral history to "writing Palestinians into history," while Israeli historian Kobi Peled noted that most Palestinian oral history projects "focus on the Nakba - including its causes and consequences." According to its mission statement, the Palestinian Rural History Project aims – in contrast – to document Palestine's historical geography, genealogies, toponymy, archaeology, agricultural practices, traditions and lore.

The PRHP's subsidiary initiative, Golan/Jawlan Oral History Corpus documents the region's rural society, historical geography, and memories of displacement, with the aim to preserve local knowledge often absent from traditional archives. The initiative records oral testimonies covering rural landholding, material culture and social relations.

By October 2022, the project has documented 700 Palestinian villages, comprising about 65% of the historically inhabited sites in Israel/Palestine. By 2026, the project's corpus has grown to over 2,500 oral-history interviews, covering 1,100 Arab inhabited sites. The corpus included 85% of all Palestinian villages. 43 percent of the Syrian villages in Golan Heights before 1967, and with a selection of sites in northern Jordan and the Hauran.

In addition to the Palestinian Rural History Project, other notable Palestinian oral history projects are the American University of Beirut's Palestinian Oral History Archive (POHA), and the Palestinian Oral History Map, Columbia University's Oral History Project in New York, Duke University's Palestinian Oral History Project, Palestine Remembered, and Zochrot.
