= I Like Mike (film) =

1961 film

- Directed by: Peter Frye
- Written by: Peter Frye; Aharon Meged
- Produced by: Yitzhak Agadati; Mordecai Navon; Ya'akov Shteiner
- Starring: Batya Lancet
- Cinematography: Nissim Leon
- Edited by: Nellie Gilad
- Production company: Geva Films
- Release date: 1961
- Running time: 120 minutes
- Country: Israel
- Language: Hebrew

I Like Mike (Hebrew: איי לייק מייק) is a 1961 Israeli drama film directed by Canadian-born Peter Frye and co-written by him and Israeli playwright Aharon Megged. It was entered into the 1961 Cannes Film Festival. The film was based on Megged's 1956 play of the same name, which was performed at the Habima Theatre in Tel Aviv in 1957. The plot is a romantic satire on the American dream pursued by many Israelis and the phenomenon of adoration for wealth and social status, which sometimes comes at the expense of true love. An ambitious mother tries to match her daughter with a young American millionaire, but both young people are in love with others.

This was Chaim Topol's first appearance in film. Avner Hizkiyahu plays 12 bearded characters. For the role of Mike, Sy Gitin was chosen. He happened to be an American student in Israel and successfully passed the screen test. This is his only film.

Salman al-Hozeil and members of his tribe also participate in the film. It was shot partly in Kibbutz Shoval. The film was screened at the Cannes Film Festival in 1961 and is currently available for viewing on the Israel Film Archive website.

== Plot ==
Yafa Arieli wants to marry her daughter, Tamara to Mike, a young American and son of a Texas tycoon visiting Israel, but Tamara is in love with Micha, a Nahal officer and a poor kibbutznik. During his flight to Israel, Mike sees a newspaper picture of a Yemenite soldier, falls in love with her, and swears to find her. Eventually, Mike finds the soldier, Nilli, who lives in a kibbutz in the Negev region, and he decides to join the kibbutz.

== Cast ==
The cast included Frye's then-wife Batya Lancet as the mother, Yafa Arieli, and:

- Gideon Singer as Benjamin Arieli
- Ze'ev Berlinsky
- Ilana Rovina as the daughter, Tamar
- Meira Shor
- Seymour Gitin as Michael "Mike" Abrahams, an American tourist
- Topol as Mikha
- Geula Nuni
- Avner Hizkiyahu
- Eitan Gitin
- Bernie Rachelle as Arik (with Topol)
