= Paul J. Kosmin =

American historian (born 1984)

Paul J. Kosmin (born 1984) is a historian of the Hellenistic period, the centuries after the conquests of Alexander the Great that saw the spread of Greek culture and language across the Eastern Mediterranean and western Asia. His main focus is the Seleucid Empire, the Macedonian successor state that ruled Syria, Babylonia, Persia, and various adjoining regions at its height. He is a professor of classics at Harvard University in Cambridge, Massachusetts.

== Biography ==
Kosmin attended Balliol College at Oxford University and graduated with a degree in Ancient and Modern History. He did his graduate program at Harvard University, where he completed a PhD in Ancient History and wrote his dissertation on the Seleucid Empire. Afterward, he attained an associate professorship in the Classics department at Harvard in 2012, and was given the named professorship of John L. Loeb Associate Professor of the Humanities in 2014.

In 2014, he published The Land of the Elephant Kings: Space, Territory, and Ideology in the Seleucid Empire, a popular adaptation of his dissertation on how the Seleucid Empire controlled its territory. In 2018, he published Time and Its Adversaries in the Seleucid Empire, a book on the Seleucid era, the Ancient Macedonian calendar, the cultural impact of timekeeping in the Hellenistic world, and related topics. Time and Its Adversaries was a joint winner of the Runciman Award in 2019. Kosmin has since collaborated with Andrea Berlin, a professor of Archeology at Boston University, on several volumes of scholarly research. The two edited Spear-Won Land: Sardis from the King's Peace to the Peace of Apamea in 2019. Spear-Won Land is a compilation of journal articles and research on the city of Sardis in Asia Minor while it was under Seleucid rule until the Peace of Apamea, which saw it transferred to the Roman-allied Kingdom of Pergamon. In 2021, Kosmin and Berlin edited a collection of articles on the latest archeological findings and scholarship on the final stages of the Maccabean Revolt and the early Hasmonean kingdom, The Middle Maccabees: Archaeology, History, and the Rise of the Hasmonean Kingdom. In 2024, he published The Ancient Shore, a book on the coast and maritime influence on classical culture.

Kosmin was awarded a Guggenheim Fellowship in 2021.
