= Thelma Ruby =

British actress (born 1925)

- Born: Thelma Wigoder; 23 March 1925 (age 101); Chapel Allerton, Leeds, West Riding of Yorkshire, England
- Occupation: Actress
- Spouse: Peter Frye (m. 1970; died 1991)

Thelma Ruby (born Thelma Wigoder; 23 March 1925) is a British actress. In addition to her long stage career, she has also appeared in radio, television and film.

Ruby is best known for her theatre roles, including Shakespearean parts, Fiddler on the Roof and Cabaret with Judi Dench, as well as for co-adapting and starring in the one-woman show Momma Golda, about Israeli Prime Minister Golda Meir.

She has had stints in television soap operas and serials such as Coronation Street and EastEnders and the sitcom Dad's Army.

== Early life and education ==
Ruby was born Thelma Wigoder at Chapel Allerton in Leeds on 23 March 1925. She grew up in an Orthodox Jewish family in Leeds. Her mother, Paula Ruby, was a singer and also an actress, whilst her father, Louis, from Lithuania, was a dentist.

She was educated at Leeds Girls' High School and, after evacuation with her mother to the United States during the Second World War, at Finch College in New York City.

Returning to Britain in 1944, Ruby joined the Entertainments National Service Association and performed to British troops.

== Early stage and film career ==
In 1958 she acted in Bernard Kops' play, The Hamlet of Stepney Green, at the Lyric Theatre, Hammersmith in London, with Harold Lang, John Fraser, John Barrard and George Selway also in the cast. She also had a role in the British film Live Now – Pay Later in 1962. Her West End theatre roles included performing as Golde in Fiddler on the Roof alongside Topol in 1984.

== Television and later theatre ==
In 1996, Ruby appeared in ITV's Coronation Street as Lily Dempsey, a friend of Phyllis Pearce.

From 1980, she and her husband, Peter Frye, adapted and performed in the play Momma Golda about the life of Golda Meir, Israel's first and only woman Prime Minister. In 2018, at the age of 93, Ruby performed extracts from Momma Golda in a one-woman show at the King's Head Theatre in London.

In 2017, she played Alice in the ITV sitcom Bad Move. In 2024, she appeared in the Amy Winehouse biopic film Back to Black.

== Personal life ==
Ruby lives in Wimbledon, London and is a member of Wimbledon Synagogue.

She was married to Jay Lewis, and subsequently to Canadian-born actor Peter Frye from 1970 until his death in 1991. She has a step-daughter from Frye's first marriage.

In 2024, Ruby publicly criticised the proposed felling of trees at, and the expansion of the site of, the Wimbledon tennis championships, which she lives nearby to. She said she would chain herself to a tree in protest.

Ruby turned 100 on 23 March 2025.

== Publications ==
Ruby-Frye, Thelma; Frye, Peter (1997) Double or Nothing: Two Lives in the Theatre. The Autobiography of Thelma Ruby and Peter Frye. Janus Publishing Company, 336 pp. ISBN 9781857562149
