= Peter Frye =

Canadian actor, screenwriter and film director

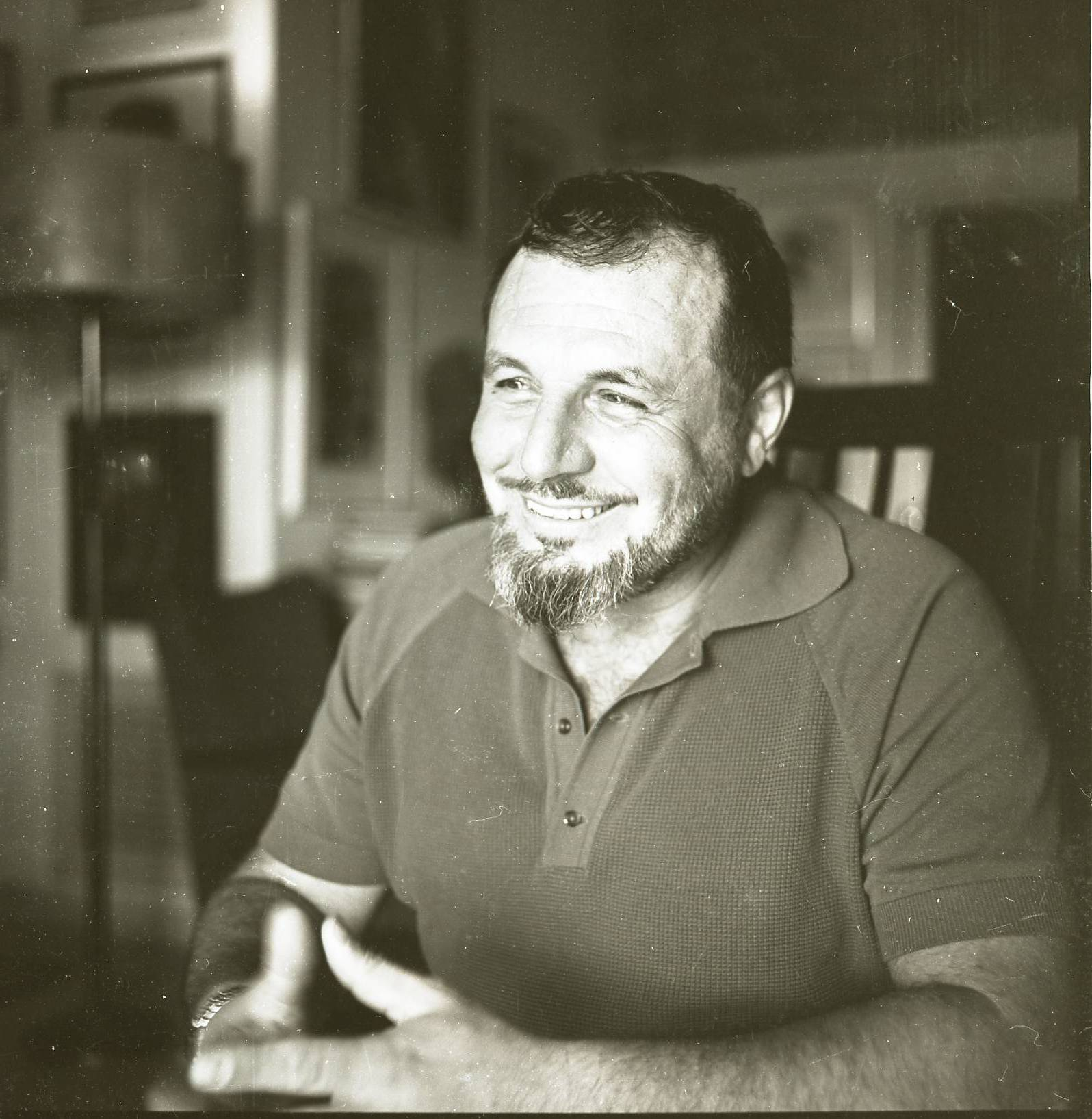
- Born: Peter Friedman; March 1, 1914; Quebec, Canada
- Died: June 2, 1991 (aged 77); Sutton, London, England, United Kingdom
- Occupations: Actor, screenwriter, film director
- Spouse: Thelma Ruby (m 1970-1991)

Peter Frye (born as Peter Friedman) was a Canadian actor, screenwriter and film director.

== Biography ==
Frye, who was Jewish, was born on March 1, 1914, in Montreal, Quebec, Canada. Frye, who spoke fluent English, French, German, Hebrew and Spanish, fought in the Spanish Civil War from 1937 to 1938 as a member of the XV International Brigade and was wounded in action. He emigrated to Israel in the 1950s and became a drama professor at the University of Tel Aviv, and also worked as a stage director, actor, screenwriter and film director. He moved to the United Kingdom in the 1970s.

Frye co-wrote the screenplay for the 1954 Israel war film Hill 24 Doesn't Answer (Hebrew: גבעה 24 אינה עונה; Giv'a 24 Einah Ona), the first feature film produced in Israel. He directed, and co-wrote the screenplay for, the 1961 Israeli drama film I Like Mike (Hebrew: איי לייק מייק), which was entered for the 1961 Cannes Film Festival. He co-directed the 1963 Israeli documentary film The Hero's Wife (Eshet Hagibor), which depicted life on a kibbutz, and directed the 1960 Israeli drama film Surprise Part, the 1966 documentary film Israel – The Holy Land and the 1969 Israel film My Margo.

His acting roles included Kasyan in the 1976 film The Sell Out, Pontius Pilate in the 1979 film Jesus, Rutherford in the 1984 film Nineteen Eighty Four and Professor Maddox in the 1988 British TV film Mr Know-all. He also acted in the 1972 Jack Gold film The Gangster Show: The Irresistible Rise of Arturo Uri.

He was married twice. His first wife was Romanian actress Batya Lancet with whom he had a daughter. His second marriage, from 1970 until his death, was to English actress Thelma Ruby. From 1980, they adapted and performed together in the play Momma Golda about the life of Golda Meir, Israel's first and only woman Prime Minister.

Frye died on June 2, 1991, in Sutton, London, England, UK.

== Filmography ==
Year	Title	Role	Notes
1943	Seeds of Freedom		
1968	Ha-Dybbuk	Sender	
1976	The Sell Out	Kasyan	
1976	The Passover Plot	Herod Antipas	
1979	Jesus	Pontius Pilate	
1984	Nineteen Eighty-Four	Rutherford	
1985	King David	Judean Elder	

== Publications ==
- Ruby-Frye, Thelma; Frye, Peter (1997). Double or Nothing: Two Lives in the Theatre. The Autobiography of Thelma Ruby and Peter Frye. Janus Publishing Company, 336 pp. ISBN 9781857562149
