= Andrea Berlin =

Archaeologist

Andrea M. Berlin is an American archaeologist and academic whose research focuses on the archaeology and history of the Achaemenid, Hellenistic, and Roman eastern Mediterranean, with particular emphasis on ceramic studies, daily life, and the archaeology of ancient Israel. She is the James R. Wiseman Chair in Classical Archaeology and Professor of Archaeology and Religion at Boston University. Berlin has conducted archaeological fieldwork in the eastern Mediterranean since 1973 and has worked throughout the eastern Mediterranean, from Troy and Sardis in Turkey to Coptos in Egypt. From 1997-2012 she was co-director of the excavations at Tel Kedesh in northern Israel. In 2011 she founded the Levantine Ceramics Project, an open-access research resource for the study of ceramics from the Levant.

== Early life and education ==
Berlin became interested in archaeology after participating in an excavation in Israel in 1973, at the age of 17. She worked at Tel Sheva, near ancient Beersheba, where she excavated a small domestic structure and encountered everyday objects including storage jars, cooking vessels, drinking cups, and spindle whorls.

She received an A.B. in Classical Studies and Near Eastern Studies from the University of Michigan, an A.M. in Syro-Palestinian Archaeology from the University of Chicago, and a Ph.D. in Classical Art and Archaeology from the University of Michigan.

== Academic career ==
From 1997-2010, Berlin taught at the University of Minnesota, moving to Boston University in 2010 as the inaugural holder of the James R. Wiseman Chair in Classical Archaeology. At Boston University she was a Professor of Archaeology and Religion, Director of Graduate Studies for the Archaeology Program, and a member of the Elie Wiesel Center for Jewish Studies.

Her research interests include the archaeology and history of the Achaemenid, Hellenistic, and Roman East, ceramic studies, Second Temple Judaism, and the archaeology of Israel. A recurring theme in her work is the use of archaeological evidence to investigate ordinary life and the effects of political and cultural change under successive empires and kingdoms.

Berlin has served on the editorial boards of the Bulletin of the American Schools of Oriental Research and Tel Aviv.

== Archaeological research ==
Berlin's fieldwork has extended across the eastern Mediterranean, including projects in Israel, Turkey, Egypt, Greece, Cyprus, and Italy. Her research has concentrated particularly on the periods following the rise of the Achaemenid Persian Empire and extending through the Hellenistic and Roman periods.

A major component of her scholarship has been ceramic analysis. Berlin has used pottery assemblages to investigate chronology, trade, cultural interaction, political change, and patterns of everyday life. Her publications include studies of pottery from Tel Anafa, Gamla, Sardis, Tel Kedesh, and other archaeological sites.

Her research on Jewish communities in the Second Temple period has included archaeological approaches to household life and identity. Her article "Jewish Life Before the Revolt: The Archaeological Evidence," published in the Journal for the Study of Judaism in 2005, examined archaeological evidence for Jewish life before the First Jewish–Roman War.

=== Tel Kedesh ===
In 1997, Berlin began co-directing excavations at Tel Kedesh in the Upper Galilee with archaeologist Sharon Herbert. The project investigated a large administrative complex first constructed during the Persian period and remained in use under the regimes of the Ptolemies and the Seleucids.

A feature of the excavations was the discovery of a large archive containing about 2000 clay seal impressions, or bullae. The archaeological evidence led the excavators to interpret the complex as an administrative center associated with imperial and regional overseers.

The excavations also produced evidence for different forms of activity within the building, including food preparation, storage, administration, and elite dining. The project has therefore provided archaeological evidence for political administration as well as aspects of daily life during the Persian and Hellenistic periods.

Berlin's continuing work at Tel Kedesh has included the study and publication of the compound’s Persian-period remains.

=== Levantine Ceramics Project ===
In 2011 Berlin founded the Levantine Ceramics Project (LCP), an open-access digital research resource designed to make archaeological ceramic data from the Levant easily accessible to researchers. The LCP has garnered contributions from hundreds of scholars working on archaeological ceramics.

The project was intended to address the difficulty of comparing ceramic evidence scattered among individual excavation projects and publications. Its database allows researchers to assemble and compare information on ceramic forms, production, distribution, and chronology across archaeological sites in the Levant.

The LCP has subsequently become a major component of Berlin's archaeological work. The American Society of Overseas Research has described it as an established research tool with more than 600 contributors from more than 30 countries.

== Publications ==
Berlin's publications include excavation reports, edited scholarly volumes, and articles on ceramics, political and cultural change, and Jewish archaeology.

=== Books and excavation reports ===
- Excavations at Tel Anafa, Volume II, Part i: The Persian, Hellenistic, and Roman Plain Wares (1997)
- The First Jewish Revolt: Archaeology, History, and Ideology (2002), co-edited with J. Andrew Overman
- Excavations at Coptos (Qift) (1988–1992) (2003), co-authored with Sharon C. Herbert
- Gamla. Final Reports, Volume I: The Pottery of the Second Temple Period (2006)
- Tel Anafa II, ii: Glass Vessels, Lamps, Objects of Metal, and Groundstone and Other Stone Tools and Vessels (2012), co-edited with Sharon C. Herbert
- Spear-Won Land: Sardis, from the King's Peace to the Peace of Apamea (2019), co-edited with Paul J. Kosmin
- The Middle Maccabees: Archaeology, History, and the Rise of the Hasmonean Kingdom (2021), co-edited with Paul J. Kosmin

Among her articles are studies of Jewish life before the First Jewish–Roman War, ceramic traditions in the Achaemenid and Hellenistic worlds, political change at Sardis, household Judaism, and the archaeological evidence from Tel Kedesh.

== Awards and recognition ==
Berlin received the Archaeological Institute of America's Award for Excellence in Undergraduate Teaching in 2009. She was a National Endowment for the Humanities Senior Fellow at the Albright Institute of Archaeological Research in 2010–2011 and received the P.E. MacAllister Field Archaeology Award from the American Schools of Overseas Research in 2021.

In 2025, the Archaeological Institute of America awarded Berlin its Gold Medal Award for Distinguished Archaeological Achievement, the organization's highest honor. The award recognized her contributions through archaeological research and fieldwork, including her work on ceramics and the Levantine Ceramics Project.

Berlin joined the board of trustees of the American Society of Overseas Research in 2025 as an institutionally elected trustee.

== Books ==
- Berlin, Andrea and Kosmin, Paul, eds (2021): The Middle Maccabees: Archaeology, History, and the Rise of the Hasmonean Kingdom
- Berlin, Andrea and Kosmin, Paul, eds (2019): Spear-Won Land: Sardis from the King's Peace to the Peace of Apamea
- Berlin, Andrea, and Sharon C. Herbert, eds (2012) Tel Anafa II, ii. Glass Vessels, Lamps, Objects of Metal, and Groundstone and Other Stone Tools and Vessels. Kelsey Museum Fieldwork Studies, Ann Arbor, MI.
- Berlin, Andrea (2006) Gamla. Final Reports, Volume I: The Pottery of the Second Temple Period. Israel Antiquities Authority Reports 29. Israel Antiquities Authority, Jerusalem.
- Berlin, Andrea, and Sharon C. Herbert, eds (2003) Excavations at Coptos (Qift) (1988–1992). Journal of Roman Archaeology Supplementary Series 53. Portsmouth, RI.
- Berlin, Andrea, and J. Andrew Overman, eds (2002) The First Jewish Revolt: Archaeology, History, and Ideology. Routledge, London.
- Berlin, Andrea (1997) Excavations at Tel Anafa, vol. II, i. The Persian, Hellenistic, and Roman Plain Wares. Journal of Roman Archaeology Supplementary Series 10.2. Portsmouth, RI.
