= The Sell Out (film) =

1976 American-British-Italian-Israeli film by Peter Collinson

- Theatrical release poster
- Directed by: Peter Collinson
- Written by: Murray Smith; Jud Kinberg
- Produced by: Josef Shaftel
- Starring: Oliver Reed; Richard Widmark; Gayle Hunnicutt
- Cinematography: Arthur Ibbetson
- Edited by: Raymond Poulton
- Music by: Colin Frechter
- Production companies: Amerfilm; Oceanglade; Hemdale
- Distributed by: Warner Bros.
- Release date: 14 May 1976
- Running time: 88 minutes
- Countries: Israel; Italy; United Kingdom
- Language: English

The Sell Out is a 1976 British-Italian-Israeli thriller film directed by Peter Collinson and starring Oliver Reed, Richard Widmark and Gayle Hunnicutt. It was filmed in Israel.

== Plot ==
The CIA, the KGB and the Mossad scheme to eliminate Gabriel Lee, a former CIA agent who defected to the Soviet Bloc but left Eastern Europe to travel to Israel. He seeks his old mentor Sam Lucas for help. Lucas is now running an antiquities store in Jerusalem with his mistress Deborah who was Gabriel's former lover.

== Cast ==
- Oliver Reed as Gabriel Lee
- Richard Widmark as Sam Lucas
- Gayle Hunnicutt as Deborah
- Sam Wanamaker as Harry Sickles
- Shmuel Rodensky as Zafron
- Vladek Sheybal as Dutchman
- Peter Frye as Kasyan
- Assi Dayan as Lt. Elan

== Critical reception ==
The Radio Times Guide to Films gave the film 2/5 stars, writing: "Before his premature death in 1980, British director Peter Collinson achieved a certain notoriety with a ragbag of action adventures like this one, set and filmed in Israel. It's not surprising to find Oliver Reed and Gayle Hunnicutt on hand, since they tended to prop up international co-productions on attractive locations, but sad to see Richard Widmark slumming it. This would-be thriller about spies brings credit to no one, and the film's pace is leaden."

Leslie Halliwell said: "Unsmiling spy melodrama with a complex plot, a bagful of clichés and some unnecessarily unpleasant violence."
