= Adon Papyrus =

Aramaic papyrus

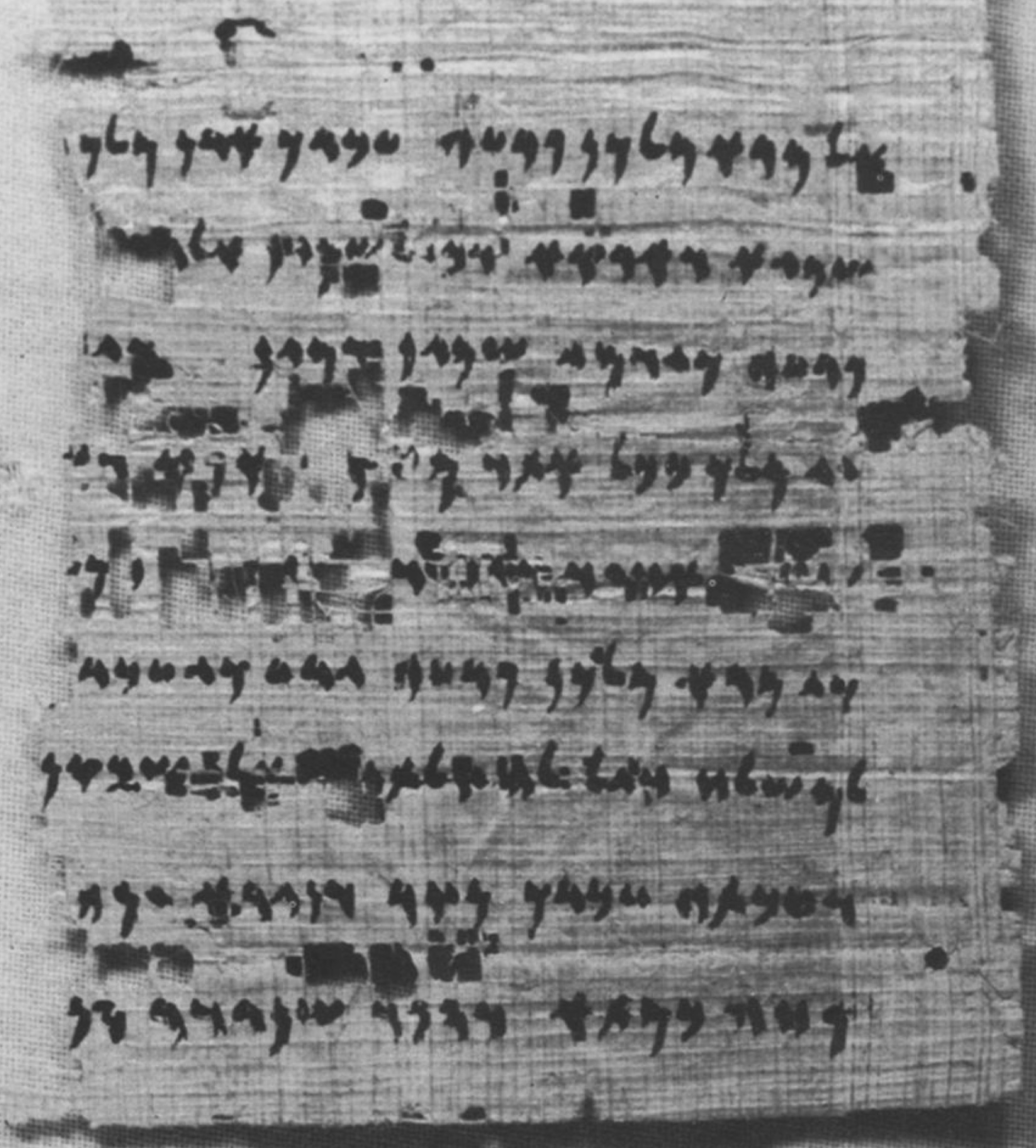
- Created: c. 600 BC
- Discovered: 1942; Saqqara, Egypt
- Discovered by: Zaki Saad Effendi
- Present location: Cairo, Cairo Governorate, Egypt

The Adon Papyrus, also known as the Aramaic Saqqara Papyrus, is an Aramaic papyrus found in 1942 at Saqqara. It was first published in 1948 by André Dupont-Sommer.

It is currently in the Egyptian Museum (J. 86984=3483).

It is also known as KAI 266 and TAD A1.1.

== Bibliography ==
- Dussaud, René (1949). "A. Dupont-Sommer. — Un papyrus araméen d'époque saïte découvert à Saqqarah". Syria. Archéologie, Art et histoire. 26 (1): 152–153.
- Bright, John (1949). "A New Letter in Aramaic, Written to a Pharaoh of Egypt". The Biblical Archaeologist. 12 (2): 46–52. doi:10.2307/3209182. JSTOR 3209182. S2CID 186537648.
- Fitzmyer, Joseph A. (1965). "The Aramaic Letter of King Adon to the Egyptian Pharaoh". Biblica. 46 (1): 41–55. JSTOR 42641032.
