= Jezreel Valley Regional Project =

Long-term archaeological project

The Jezreel Valley Regional Project is an archaeological survey and excavation project, exploring Palestine/Israel's Jezreel Valley, from prehistory to modern times during the British Mandate.

== Background ==
The project is directed by Matthew J. Adams. Its stated mission is to present a "a total history of the region using the tools and theoretical approaches of such disciplines as archaeology, anthropology, geography, history, ethnography, and the natural sciences, within an organizational framework provided by landscape archaeology".

The Jezreel Valley Regional Project undertakes excavations at Tel Megiddo, Tel Shush, Ein el-Jarba, Tel Shimron and the Roman camp of Legio/Lajjun.

== Publications ==
Monographs and edited volumes

- M.J. Adams, Salvage Excavations at Tel Qashish (Tell Qasis) and Tell el-Wa’er (2010-2013) (ed. with E.C.M. van den Brink, Jezreel Valley Regional Project Studies, 1; Lockwood Press, 2023)

Articles

- Roy Marom, Matthew J. Adams, & Yotam Tepper (2025). "The Mosque of Ibrahim: A 10th-Century Shrine at al-Lajjun." Journal of Islamic Archaeology 11(2): 123–146. https://doi.org/10.1558/jia.28376
- Marom, Roy; Tepper, Yotam; Adams, Matthew J. (2025-03-15). "Al-Lajjun: a social and geographic account of a Palestinian Village during the British Mandate Period". British Journal of Middle Eastern Studies. 52 (2): 374–400. doi:10.1080/13530194.2023.2279340. ISSN 1353-0194.
- R. Marom, Y. Tepper, and M.J. Adams, “Al-Lajjun: Forgotten Provincial Capital in Ottoman Palestine,” Levant (Published online: 9 May 2023): 1–24.
- M.J. Adams, “The Three Temples in antis at Megiddo,” Journal of Ancient Egyptian Interconnections 37 (2023): 17–38.
- R. Kalisher, M.S. Cradic, M.J. Adams, M.A.S. Martin, I. Finkelstein, “Cranial trephination and infectious disease in the Eastern Mediterranean: The evidence from two elite brothers from Late Bronze Megiddo, Israel,” PLOS One (22 Feb, 2023).
- R. Shaar, Y. Gallet, Y. Vaknin, L. Gonen, M.A.S. Martin, M.J. Adams, I. Finkelstein, “Archaeomagnetism in the Levant and Mesopotamia Reveals the Largest Changes in the Earth’s Geomagnetic Field,” Journal of Geophysical Research – Solid Earth (2022): 1–16.
- S.J. Price, M.J. Adams, Y. Tepper, “Lifeways and Settlement Choices at Tell Abu Shusha, Israel: An Integrated Spatial Approach to Survey Archaeology,” Archaeological Prospection (2022): 1–15.
- M. Fischer, M.J. Adams, N.L. Ben Ami, and Y. Tepper, “A Fragmentary Sculpture of Victoria from the Legionary Base at Legio,” Israel Exploration Journal 72.2 (2022): 238–254.
- L. Sapir-Hen, D.N. Fulton, M.J. Adams, and I. Finkelstein, “Temple and the Town at Early Bronze Age I Megiddo: Faunal Evidence for the Emergence of Complexity,” Bulletin of the American Schools of Oriental Research 387 (2022): 1–14.
- I. Finkelstein and M.J. Adams, “The Megiddo Gates: Outdated Views Versus New Data,” Tel Aviv 48.2 (2021): 208–212.
- Y. Tepper, W. Eck, G. Leyfirer, and M.J. Adams, “A Roman Military Funerary Inscription from Legio, Israel,” Tel Aviv 48.2 (2021): 248–266.
- I. Finkelstein, M.J. Adams, E. Hall, and E. Levy, “The Iron Age Gates of Megiddo: New Evidence and Updated Interpretations,” Tel Aviv 46.2 (2019): 167–91.
- M.J. Adams, M. Cradic, Y. Farhi, M. Peers, and Y. Tepper, “A Betyl with a Decorated Base from the Principia of the Roman VIth Ferrata Legionary Base, Legio, Israel,” Israel Museum Studies in Archaeology 9 (2019): 68–91.
- V. Linares, M.J. Adams, M.S. Cradic, I. Finkelstein, O. Lipschits, M.A.S. Martin, R. Neumann, C. Spiteri, P.W. Stockhammer, and Y. Gadot, “First Evidence for Vanillin in the Old World: Its Use as Mortuary Offering in Middle Bronze Canaan,” Journal of Archaeological Science: Reports 25 (2019): 77–84.
- R. Homsher, M.J. Adams, A. Prins, R. Gardner-Cook, and Y. Tepper, “New Directions with Digital Archaeology and Spatial Analysis in the Jezreel Valley,” Journal of Landscape Ecology 10.3 (2017): 154–164.
- M.J. Adams, “The Egyptianized Pottery Cache from Megiddo’s Area J: A Foundation Deposit for Temple 4040,” Tel Aviv 44.2 (2017): 141–164.
- M.J. Adams, “Djehutihotep and Megiddo in the Early Middle Bronze Age,” Journal of Ancient Egyptian Interconnections 13 (2017): 1–11.
- Y. Tepper, J. David, and M.J. Adams, “Excavations at the Camp of the Roman Sixth Ferrata Legion at Legio (el-Lajjun), Israel. A Preliminary Report of the 2013 season,” Strata: The Bulletin of the Anglo-Israel Archaeological Society 34 (2016): 87–120.
- D. Langut, M.J. Adams, and I. Finkelstein, “Climate, Settlement Patterns and Olive Horticulture in the Southern Levant during the Early Bronze and Intermediate Bronze Ages (ca. 3600–1950 BCE),” Levant 48.2 (July 2016): 1–18.
- R.S. Homsher, B. L. Drake, Y. Tepper, M. J. Adams, and J. K. David, “From the Bronze Age to the ‘Lead Age’. Observations on Sediment Analyses at Two Archaeological Sites in the Jezreel Valley, Israel: the Roman Camp at Legio and the Early Bronze Age Village at Tel Megiddo East,” Mediterranean Archaeology & Archaeometry 16.1 (2016): 187–204.
- A. Prins, M.J. Adams, M. Ashley, R.S. Homsher, “Digital Archaeological Fieldwork and the Jezreel Valley Regional Project, Israel,” Near Eastern Archaeology 77:3 (2014): 196–201.
- M.J. Adams, J. David, R. Homsher, M.E. Cohen, “New Evidence for the Rise of a Complex Society in the Late Fourth Millennium at Tel Megiddo East in the Jezreel Valley,” Near Eastern Archaeology 77:1 (2014): 32–43.
- M.J. Adams, I. Finkelstein and D. Ussishkin, “The Great Temple of Early Bronze I Megiddo,” American Journal of Archaeology 118.2 (2014): 1–21.
- J. Pincus, T. DeSmet, Y. Tepper, and M.J. Adams, “Ground Penetrating Radar and Electromagnetic Archaeogeophysical Investigations at the Roman Legionary Camp at Legio, Israel,” Archaeological Prospection 20.3 (2013): 1–13.
