= Israeli Geographical Association =

Professional association

Israeli Geographical Association (Hebrew: האגודה הגאוגרפית הישראלית, HaAguda HaGe'ografit HaYisra'elit) is a professional association of geographers in Israel. the Society members engaged in all areas of human and physical Geography. the Israeli Geographic Society is working since 1959 to promote Israel's varied geography and its representation in the world. Israeli Geographical Association is a member of International Geographical Union (IGU). "

Between the goals of the Association: to promote knowledge, geographical research and teaching, raising awareness of the achievements and contribution to geography, geography domain representation in various forums, promoting the professional status of geographers.

Between tasks Association: Annual Conference which takes place during Hanukkah and Society Awards which geographically unique contribution to geographical education, distributing a monthly newsletter and journals including the Journal "Horizons in Geography", running a distribution list and a website.

The Association operates under the auspices of the Israeli Student Organization of Geography, member of European Students of Geography (EGEA).

The Association is a nonprofit organization and it operates according to democratic principles. The Association Council and the President is chosen every two years and are a higher authority. Between the presidents of the Association in the past, Israel Prize laureates were: Professor David Amiran, Professor Dov Nir, Professor Moshe Brawer and Professor Arie Shachar.
