= Baruch Halpern =

American academic

Baruch Halpern is the Covenant Foundation Professor of Jewish Studies at the University of Georgia. He was a leader of the archaeological digs at Tel Megiddo 1992–2007, as well as of an archaeological survey in southeastern Cilicia (Turkey). As an undergraduate at Harvard in 1972, he wrote a political analysis of the Bible, which subsequently influenced research into its authorship.

== Career ==
He is noted for his use of archaeological information to interpret the meaning of Biblical texts (for example, the explanation of Ehud's murder of King Eglon and escape without detection from the "upper room," see Judges 3:12–30, in Halpern's book The First Historians: The Hebrew Bible and History, pp. 55–59). He has said:

You cannot know the culture without knowing the material culture, either. So we need to combine text with what's in the ground, and, when our evidence is a little dirigible, we also need ethnological help, preferably from our region. This is no different in terms of reconstructing thought than needing to know the central and related languages involved.

Halpern's theory of the development of Israelite monotheism, first articulated in a 1986 publication, involves the differentiation of the state God, YHWH, from His former subordinates and colleagues, collectively "the baal" or "the baals". This grew into alienation especially around and after the fall of Israel ca. 720 and the Assyrian devastation of Judah in 701. Economically, specialization and the operation of comparative advantage spread partly as a result of competing operative trade networks; this led to partial industrialization and to relative urbanization. Intellectually, the trade-driven renaissance in intellectual exchange provoked a Reformation, of which the reforms of Hezekiah (ca. 701) and Josiah (ca. 622) were manifestations (all 2009).

Halpern has strongly criticized biblical minimalists, particularly Israel Finkelstein's "Low Chronology" theory: in his 1995 essay Erasing History: The Minimalist Assault on Ancient Israel he defends the historicity of the United Monarchy and of kings Saul, David and Solomon. However, he is far from a literalist: in his book David's Secret Demons: Messiah, Murderer, Traitor, King, he describes David as a bloody tyrant, whose image was later whitewashed by the Books of Samuel.

== Books ==
- Cultural Contact and Appropriation in the Axial-Age Mediterranean World, edited with Kenneth Sacks and Tyler E. Kelley. Leiden: Brill, 2016.
- From Gods to God. Leiden: Brill, 2009.
- David's Secret Demons: Messiah, Murderer, Traitor, King. Wm. B. Eerdmans Publishing. 2003
- The Rise of Ancient Israel: Symposium at the Smithsonian Institution (1991, with Hershel Shanks, William Dever, and P. Kyle McCarter)
- The Emergence of Israel in Canaan (1983)
- The Constitution of the Monarchy in Israel (1981)
- The First Historians: The Hebrew Bible and History (1980)

== Articles and shorter pieces ==
- "The Rise of Abimelek Ben-Jerubbaal," Hebrew Annual Review 2 (1978): 79–100.
- "The Centralization Formula in Deuteronomy," Vetus Testamentum 31.1 (1981): 20–38.
- "The Housebreaking Law of Exodus 21:37– 22:3: A Synchronic View," Maarav 20.2 (2013): 247–250.
