= John de Foxton =

Clergyman and author

John de Foxton (born 1369, fl. 1388–1434) was a clergyman and author from Yorkshire. He was a subdeacon from 1388; a vicar from 1406; a chaplain, probably in an aristocratic household, from 1408; and a rector from 1430 to 1434. He passed his entire career in Yorkshire.

A phlebotomy–zodiac man, from Foxton's Liber Cosmographiae

Between 1385 and 1408, Foxton worked on an encyclopaedic compilation with a scientific focus, the Liber Cosmographiae. It survives today in a single illustrated manuscript.

== Author ==
Foxton identifies himself as author of the Liber Cosmographiae by means of a cryptogram, citing modesty. His name probably indicates that he hailed from a place named Foxton, either the hamlet near Osmotherley or another hamlet in the North Riding.

In 1388, Foxton was ordained a subdeacon in York Cathedral. Since the usual age for such ordination was 19, he was probably born in 1369. He held a "title" from, that is, was sponsored by, Jervaulx Abbey in the archdeaconry of Richmond, although this probably meant only that the abbey vouched for his character and did not provide him an income.

Incomplete or lost registers prevent the tracing of Foxton's career. In 1406, he was appointed vicar of Fishlake with an income of thirteen pounds per year. By 1408, as indicated in the colophon of the Liber Cosmographiae, he was a chaplain of some sort, probably in a noble household, possibly the Nevilles. He is described the same way in a document of 1420. In 1430, he exchanged Fishlake for Laughton en le Morthen, which had an income of only six pounds, and received the rectorship of Dinnington. He resigned Dinnington in 1434 for reasons unknown. The record of his resignation still refers to him as a chaplain and he may have resigned to focus on his chaplaincy. After his he disappears from the record. He was probably dead by 1450.

== Liber Cosmographiae ==
=== Contents ===
The Liber Cosmographiae is "a compendium of popular science in 104 chapters" written in Latin prose. Its topics include mythography (angels, gods), history (classics, British history), medicine (obstetrics, menstruation, diet), prognostication (astrology, kalandologion), cosmography (constellations, planets, eclipses, comets) and meteorology (dew, thunder, tides, weather forecasting).

Foxton enciphers many words in a unique substitution alphabet, probably of his own devising. The purpose of it was to make chapters on prognostication inaccessible to the casual reader. According to John B. Friedman, who edited the text, Foxton's central idea is that "the planets influence the four elements and four humours". In an effort to save the orthodoxy of his position, Foxton acknowledges the role of human will. The stars and planets determine humanity's natural state, but humans can will good or evil. The motion of the spheres is responsible for tides (moon) and heat (sun), but their influence is, like magnetism, invisible. Since the fall of man, the humours have been out of balance. As a result, diet, medicine and prognostication are necessary to offset the imbalance. This is the reason Foxton devotes chapters to diet, physiognomy, cheiromancy, phlebotomy and lunaries.

An important influence on Foxton's outlook may have been his fellow Englishman, Themo Judaeus, who taught at Paris before 1371.

=== Composition ===
Foxton began work on the Liber in 1385, as indicated by a coded poem within, when he was only about sixteen years old. Although the prologue of the work does not name a patron, it is probable that the work was made for John Erghome, who was master regent and prior of the Augustinian Friary in York in 1385. The completed work may never have been presented to Erghome on account of his death.

Most of the work was completed by 1396. Foxton had access to the Durham Dean and Chapter Library and shortly after 1396 made use of the manuscript Arundel 507 for its anthology of proverbial poetry. The Liber Cosmographiae was not completed until 1408, since it mentions the battle of Bramham Moor that took place that year.

=== Sources ===
Foxton extensively borrowed verbatim from the De natura rerum of Thomas of Cantimpré, especially in his first 28 chapters. To a lesser extent he used the Speculum historiale of Vincent of Beauvais, which was based on Thomas. He never cites Thomas by name and may not have known his name. He did not include Thomas's moralitates (moralizing stories). He used the writings of William of Conches, from which excerpts from Boethius and Plato entered the Liber. He also used the Pseudo-Boethian Disciplina scolarium and a commentary on its "Questions of Crato" passage. For the history in the final seven chapters, Foxton relied heavily on some folding parchment tables that hung in York Cathedral for the benefit of pilgrims between 1377 and 1534.

Foxton cites many authors, probably read mostly in florilegia. Classical and early Christian authors include Vergil, Ovid, Horace, Juvenal, Seneca the Younger, Pseudo-Seneca, Cato the Elder, Pseudo-Cato, Martianus Capella, Prudentius and Coelius Sedulius. Patristic and scholastic authorities include Augustine of Hippo, Pseudo-Augustine, the Moralia in Job, John Chrysostom, Jerome of Stridon, Cyprian of Carthage, Ambrose of Milan, Pseudo-Leo the Great, Isidore of Seville, Bede, Honorius Augustodunensis, the Glossa ordinaria, Bernard of Clairvaux, Alan of Lille, Albert the Great, Peter Comestor, Peter of Riga and Ulrich of Strasbourg. He also cites the Jewish author Moses Maimonides and the Pseudo-Aristotelian Secretum secretorum.

Among more recent sources that served also as models for his work, Foxton heavily mined John Ridewall's Fulgentius metaforalis and the anonymous Secretum philosophorum.

=== Manuscripts ===
The complete Liber Cosmographiae is known from a single manuscript, now Trinity College, Cambridge, R.15.21, where it occupies folios 1r–77v. It was written by a single scribe in a Gothic hand called textura semi-quadrata. The parchment measures 10 by 7 inches (250 mm × 180 mm) and the text is in two columns. The manuscript was copied at the Augustinian Friary in York, but illustrated elsewhere. The manuscript may be an autograph—i.e., Foxton may himself have been the scribe—but the poor state of the text in many places suggests that it is a copy and not the original.

The manuscript's colophon indicates that it was completed in 1408, the same year as the compendium was finished, and given by John de Foxton to Knaresborough Priory. The colophon includes a book curse on anyone who would take it from the priory. It was presumably acquired by a prelate at the Dissolution of the Monasteries, like many illuminated manuscripts. It was donated to Trinity College by Archbishop John Whitgift.

The Liber Cosmographiae is the main text of R.15.21, but it is not the only text. The same scribe also included an almanach and kalendar by John Somer; an account of the six ages of the world and the four ages of man; a list of famous people (drawn from the bible and classical history), heresies, church councils and emperors with the lengths of their reigns; and some excerpts from Martin of Opava's Chronicon pontificum et imperatorum. The last two folios were written by a different scribe, perhaps a later owner, and may have no connection to Foxton. They contain a list of British monarchs from Brutus of Troy to Richard II of England.

Sections of the Liber Cosmographiae are found across seven folios of the manuscript London, British Library, Harley 2321, copied in the mid-15th century.

=== Illustrations ===
The Liber in R.15.21 is decorated by twelve full-page miniatures in colour in the International Gothic style. It is otherwise mostly devoid of decoration, save for initials in red and blue ink and rubrication. Lunation and phlebotomy tables are done in red and black ink, astronomical diagrams are in red ink and cheiromantic hands in red ink. A series of illustrations of the zodiac were never completed.

It has been argued that the illustrator of the Liber was John Siferwas, who also illustrated the Sherborne Missal.

== Bibliography ==
- Chance, Jane (2000). Medieval Mythography. Vol. 2: From the School of Chartres to the Court at Avignon, 1177–1350. University Press of Florida.
- Diekstra, F. N. M. (1990). "The Text of John B. Friedman's Edition of John de Foxton's Liber Cosmographiae (1408)". Vivarium. 28 (1): 55–76. doi:10.1163/156853490X00054. JSTOR 42569833.
- Friedman, John Block (1982). "The Cipher Alphabet of John de Foxton's Liber Cosmographiæ". Scriptorium. 36 (2): 219–235. doi:10.3406/scrip.1982.1268. PMID 18924289.
- Friedman, John Block (1983). "John Siferwas and the Mythological Illustrations in the Liber cosmographiae of John de Foxton". Speculum. 58 (2): 391–418. doi:10.2307/2848260. JSTOR 2848260.
- Friedman, John Block, ed. (1988). John de Foxton's Liber Cosmographiae (1408): An Edition and Codicological Study. Brill.
- Friedman, John Block (2016). "John de Foxton". In G. Dunphy (ed.). Encyclopedia of the Medieval Chronicle Online. Brill. doi:10.1163/2213-2139_emc_SIM_000886.
- James, M. R. (1901). The Western Manuscripts in the Library of Trinity College, Cambridge: A Descriptive Catalogue. Vol. 2. Cambridge University Press.
- Rand, Kari Anne (2013). "The Syon Pardon Sermon: Contexts and Texts". In Martha W. Driver; Veronica O'Mara (eds.). Preaching the Word in Manuscript and Print in Late Medieval England: Essays in Honour of Susan Powell. Brepols. pp. 317–349.
- Thomas, Marcel (1978). L'Âge d'or de l'enluminure: Jean de France, duc de Berry et son temps. Éditions Vilo-Paris.
