= Jerry Pattengale =

American academic

Jerry A. Pattengale (born 1958) is a faculty member and administrator at Indiana Wesleyan University. He coined and founded the approach of “purpose-guided education” in 1997 while leading the implementation of student success programs at Indiana Wesleyan University. His approach includes calling for a humanities approach to student success, and the need for faculty involvement in the development of strategies.

In 2007 and 2008, he participated in Roundtable meetings at the White House on compassion efforts through OFBCI. In 2020, he spoke at the United Nations (NYC) as part of the UN's Plan of Action to Safeguard Religious Sites. From 2010 to 2014, he served as the founding Executive Director of the Green Scholars Initiative while researching historic items in the Green Collection. In 2026 it transitioned to “Logos” under Inspire, a foundation complementing Museum of the Bible.

Pattengale was one of the two founding scholars and leaders (2010) of the Museum of the Bible, which opened in Washington, D.C., in November 2017, and served as the museum's Executive Director of Education until retiring in 2018. In the spring of 2020 he returned as Senior Advisor to the President.

In 2019-2020 he served as the interim president and CEO for Religion News Service and the Religion News Foundation. He co-authored the six-episode TV docuseries (and book), Inexplicable: How Christianity Spread to the Ends of the Earth (TBN, 2020, hosted by Dennis Haysbert).

He founded the youth program, J.C. Body Shop, in 1981 - now enjoying an expansive state-of-the art facility on the edge of the Indiana Wesleyan University campus.

== Recognition ==
In 1994 he received a National Endowment of Humanities Award to Corinth, Greece, and in 2000 Houghton Mifflin and USC presented him The National Student Advocate Award. In 1993 and 1995 the student body of Azusa Pacific named him Professor of the Year, and in 1994, Alpha Chi (Honors) Outstanding Faculty of the Year. In 2012, while Pattengale was a non-resident Senior Fellow at Baylor University's Center for the Studies of Religion, Indiana Wesleyan University awarded him the World Changing Faculty Award In 2014, it named him its first University Professor since its 1920 founding.

In 2015 and 2016, the Indiana Associated Press Media Editors and the Hoosier State Press Association each honored Pattengale for his newspaper commentaries.

In 2017, he served as a consultant for Lee Strobel's film The Case for Christ (produced by Peter Schockey). He has served Indiana Wesleyan University in academic administration since 1997, most recently as Assistant Provost for Public Engagement. In 2021, Pattengale received the Indiana Wesleyan Alumni World Changer Award, in recognition of having made a significant difference in the field of higher learning. In Dec. 2021, The National Press Club awarded him its “Vivian Award” for his long-term service on its membership selection committee.

He is the recipient of Indiana's highest award, presented by its governor in 2024—"The Sagamore of the Wabash". He is the author of The New Book of Christian Martyrs as highlighted in the TV special, Heroes of the Faith hosted by Eric Stacklebeck. He was also the Editor and an on-screen personality for the four-hour TV series, David: King of Israel, seasons one and two, 2026-27 (hosted by Zachary Levi). He has authored dozens of books, including the public-school textbook for Museum of the Bible: The Bible’s Influence on Western Civilization in 2026.

He currently sits on the boards of Christianity Today, Africa New Life (Rwanda), Changing Destiny (Asia), Bible Journey, and The Jonathan Edwards Center at Yale University. He holds distinguished appointments at Excelsia College (Australia), Waverley Abbey College (UK), Gordon-Conwell Theological Seminary, and Sagamore Institute.

== Personal life ==
In 1993 he obtained a Ph.D. at Miami University; his dissertation was titled "Benevolent physicians in late antiquity: The cult of the anargyroi". Within his dozens of books and hundreds of news columns are references to his impoverished and adventurous childhood in Buck Creek, Indiana. His mantra among his education books is “The dream needs to be stronger than the struggle,” supported by years of research.

== "First Century Mark" ==
In May 2018, Dirk Obbink and Daniela Colomo published the papyrus fragment P.Oxy. 5345 in volume LXXXIII of the Oxyrhynchus Papyri series of the Egypt Exploration Society. This fragment contained portions of six verses from the first chapter of the Gospel of Mark, and was designated 𝔓^{137} in the standard classification of New Testament papyri. Obbink and Colomo dated it to the later 2nd or earlier 3rd century, but rumours of its content, provenance and date had been widely discussed since 2012, fuelled by an ill-advised claim by Daniel B. Wallace in 2012 that a fragmentary papyrus of Mark had been authoritatively dated to the late first century by one of the world's leading paleographers, and might consequently be the earliest surviving Christian text.

Following publication in 2018, the Egypt Exploration Society, the owners of the papyrus fragment, released a statement clarifying both the provenance of the fragment and the role of Obbink in the circumstances of misleading information subsequently emerging on social media. The EES stated that the text in the fragment had only been recognised as being from the Gospel of Mark in 2011. In an earlier cataloguing in the 1980s, the fragment had been described as 'I/II', which appeared to be the origin of the much discussed assertions of a very early date. In 2011/2012 the papyrus was in the keeping of Obbink, who had shown it to Scott Carroll and Pattengale, representing the Green Collection and its programs respectively. It was not until the spring of 2016 that the EES realised that the rumoured "First Century Mark" papyrus that had become the subject of so much speculation was one and the same as their own fragment P.Oxy. 5345; whereupon Obbink and Colomo were requested to prepare it for publication.

In the July/August 2019 issue of Christianity Today, Jerry Pattengale wrote an article in which he published for the first time his own perspectives on the 'First Century Mark' Saga. Pattengale states that he had been present with Scott Carroll in Obbink's rooms in Christ Church, Oxford in late 2011, when the Papyrus 137 fragment was offered for sale to the Museum of the Bible, which Pattengale then represented. Also offered for sale were fragments of the Gospels of Matthew, Luke and John, all of which Obbink had then proposed as likely to be of a 2nd-century date; but the Mark fragment was presented as more likely 1st century. According to Pattengale, he had undertaken due diligence in showing images of the four fragments to selected New Testament textual scholars, including Daniel B. Wallace, subject to their signing non-disclosure agreements in accordance with Obbink's stipulations; and purchase was eventually finalised, with the fragments agreed to remain in Obbink's possession for research prior to publication. It was not until a gala dinner in November 2017, celebrating the opening of the Museum of the Bible, that Pattengale realised that the First Century Mark fragment had been the property of the Egypt Exploration Society all along, and consequently had never legitimately been offered for sale. He reported this immediately, from the gala. The key backstory and personality profiles in this case are profiled in The Atlantic (May 2020) by Ariel Sabar.
