= John Ridewall =

John Ridewall (fl. 1331–1340), also known as John of Musca, was the 54th regent master of the Franciscans at Oxford. He received his doctorate in theology around 1331 and was regent in 1331–1332. He was still living in October 1340, when he was in Basel. His known writings are:

Minerva, Juno and Venus, from the illustrated copy of Fulgentius metaforalis in Palatinus Latinus 1066

- Commentarius super Fulgencium, his most popular work, a commentary on the Mitologiae of Fulgentius
- Lectura super Apocalypsi, a commentary on Revelation surviving only in excerpts and quotations in Robert Holcot
- A commentary on Augustine of Hippos' De civitate Dei, of which only books 1–3 and 6–7 survive

The Commentarius super Fulgencium, better known as Fulgentius metaforalis, has been edited at least twice, firstly by Hans Liebeschuetz in 1926 and more recently and completely by Ralph Hanna in 2023. It was designed to offer material to preachers by giving a moralizing treatment of classical mythology. It is found both as a marginal text surrounding the text of Fulgentius, a format common for commentaries, and as an independent treatise unaccompanied by Fulgentius' text. It is preserved in nine manuscripts, but nowhere complete. A majority of the manuscripts are of German origin. Some manuscripts contain an anonymous short continuation on the four virtues, De quattuor virtutibus, ascribed to a nameless "chancellor of Paris". Both texts are found in the illustrated manuscript Palatinus Latinus 1066 from southern Germany. The Liber cosmographiae of John de Foxton has been called a continuation of Fulgentius metaforalis. Ridewall's work also furnished material for two further condensations, the Ymagines Fulgencii and Prudentia depingebatur.

Two further works are sometimes attributed to Ridewall:

- Ovidii Metamorphoseos fabule ccxviii moraliter exposite, a commentary on Ovid's Metamorphoses, anonymous in the manuscript, sometimes presumed to be Ridewall's, but usually attributed to Pierre Bersuire
- In Valerium ad Rufinum de uxore non ducenda, a commentary on Walter Map's Dissuasio Valerii ad Rufinum philosophum ne uxorem ducat, usually attributed to Ridewall, but possibly by John of Wales

== Bibliography ==
- Allen, Judson Boyce (1979). "Commentary as Criticism: The Text, Influence, and Literary Theory of the Fulgentius Metaphored of John Ridewall". In P. Tuynman; G. C. Kuiper; E. Kessler (eds.). Acta Conventus Neo-Latini Amstelodamensis. Fink Verlag. pp. 25–47.
- Catto, Jeremy (2004). "Ridevall [Musca], John". Oxford Dictionary of National Biography (online ed.). Oxford University Press. doi:10.1093/ref:odnb/23621. (Subscription, Wikipedia Library access or UK public library membership required.)
- Chance, Jane (2000). Medieval Mythography. Vol. 2: From the School of Chartres to the Court at Avignon, 1177–1350. University Press of Florida.
- Friedman, John Block, ed. (1988). John de Foxton's Liber Cosmographiae (1408): An Edition and Codicological Study. Brill.
- Hanna, Ralph (2021). "Lost Libraries: The Case of the Oxford Franciscans, c. 1330–1340". Journal of the Early Book Society for the Study of Manuscripts and Printing History. 24: 27–50.
- Hanna, Ralph, ed. (2023). John Ridewall, Fulgentius metaforalis. Liverpool University Press.
- Little, Andrew G. (1892). The Grey Friars of Oxford. Vol. 1, Part 2. Oxford University Press.
- Saxl, Fritz (1942). "A Spiritual Encyclopaedia of the Later Middle Ages". Journal of the Warburg and Courtauld Institutes. 5: 82–142.
- Smalley, Beryl (1956). "John Ridewall's Commentary on De civitate Dei". Medium Ævum. 25 (3): 140–153.
- Smith, J. J. (2003). "John de Ridevall" (PDF). New Catholic Encyclopedia. Vol. 7: Hol–Jub (2nd ed.). Gale. p. 955.
