= Papyrus 137 =

Papyrus 𝔓^{137}
- New Testament manuscript
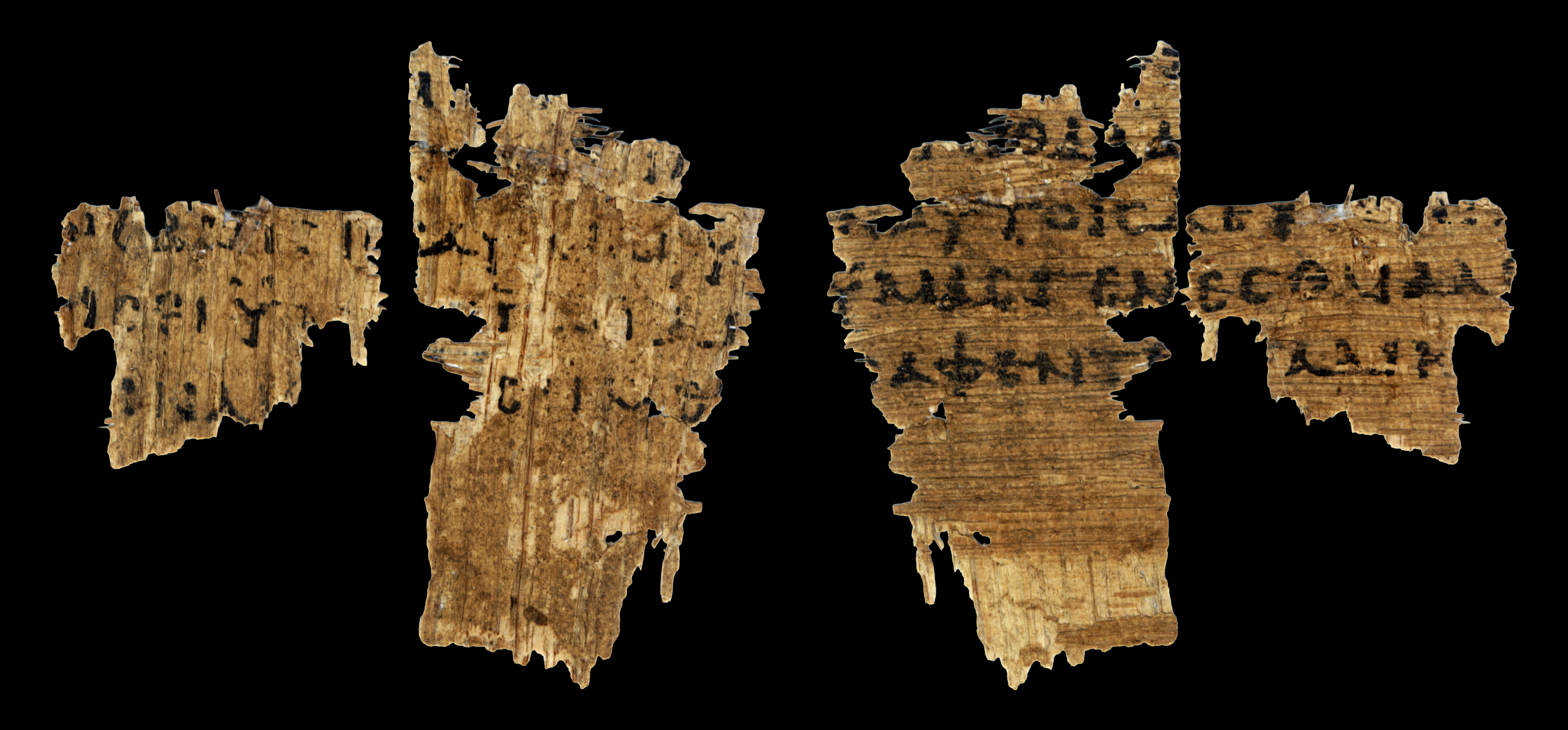
- Recto, Mark 1:7-9 (left); verso, Mark 1:16-18 (right)
- Name: P. Oxy. 5345
- Text: Mark 1:7-9; 1:16-18
- Date: c. 150-250
- Script: Greek
- Found: Egypt
- Now at: Sackler Library
- Cite: D. Obbink and D. Colomo, OP LXXXIII (2018), pp. 4-7.
- Size: 4.4 cm * 4.0 cm
- Type: Alexandrian Text-Type

Papyrus 137 (designated as 𝔓^{137} in the Gregory-Aland numbering system) is the earliest surviving manuscript of the Gospel of Mark. It is a late 2nd or early 3rd century fragment of the first chapter of the Gospel of Mark (verses 7–9 on the recto side and 16–18 on the verso side.) The fragment is from a codex and has been published in the Oxyrhynchus papyrus series as P.Oxy. LXXXIII 5345.

== Description ==
The fragment preserves parts of the bottom five lines (recto and verso) of a leaf; which could represent the first page of a single quire codex; and which may be reconstructed as having 25 lines per page with a written area of 9.4cm x 12 cm. On the recto side, the papyrus strips are laid vertically, while on the verso side they are laid horizontally. It is the earliest surviving witness to the text that it covers; otherwise the only early papyrus witness to Mark is in six surviving leaves of Papyrus 45, dated to the 3rd Century, which nowhere overlaps with the text in 𝔓^{137}. Letters on the verso survive clearly, but those on the recto are seriously abraded. The handwriting is in a formal bookhand which the editors propose as having the characteristics of the "‘Formal Mixed" hand (juxtaposing narrower and wider letter forms) elsewhere found in dateable documents of the later second and third centuries. The editors propose the fragments Papyrus 103 and Papyrus 77 of the Gospel of Matthew, also from Oxyrhynchus and conserved at the Sackler Library, as being the closest New Testament papyri to 𝔓^{137} in handwriting and date.

=== Particular readings ===
The term 'Holy Spirit' at verse 8 on the recto is shortened from πνευματι to π̣̅ν̣̅ι as a nomen sacrum. Also in verse 8 on the recto, the dative preposition εν('in') is not found in 𝔓^{137} either before 'water' or before 'Holy Spirit'; whereas the standard text of Mark in Novum Testamentum Graece (NA28) has the dative preposition in the second instance only; "..he will baptize you in the Holy Spirit", following in this the Codex Sinaiticus. In omitting a dative preposition in both instances at verse 8, 𝔓^{137} supports the alternative reading of this verse in Mark of the Codex Vaticanus and all editions of the Nestle-Aland Novum Testamentum Graece up to NA25. All four canonical Gospels introduce their accounts of the ministry of Jesus with these words from John the Baptist. In the Gospel of Luke (3:16) the dative preposition is found before 'Holy Spirit' but not before 'water'; whereas in the Gospel of Matthew (3:11) and the Gospel of John (1:33) both 'water' and 'Holy Spirit' are preceded by the dative preposition. The fragment otherwise supports no established variant readings from the standard texts for Mark; although the name of 'Jesus' is omitted from verse 17 at the third line of the verso, possibly through parablepsis as a scribal error. The editors note that the space presumed on the recto above the preserved lines of the fragment would imply an opening text of Mark of very similar length to that witnessed in the Codex Sinaiticus; contrary to the proposals of Karl Lachmann and others that some of these verses (especially 2 and 3) might be later intrusions.

Present location

It is currently housed at the Sackler Library (P. Oxy. LXXXIII 5345) in Oxford.

== "First-Century Mark" ==
𝔓^{137} was first published in 2018, but rumours of the content and provenance of a yet unpublished Gospel papyrus had been widely disseminated on social media since 2012, following a claim by Daniel B. Wallace that a recently identified fragmentary papyrus of Mark had been dated to the late first century by a leading papyrologist, and might therefore be the earliest surviving Christian text.

In May 2018, Bart D. Ehrman discussed the First-Century Mark (FCM) issue on his personal blog, taking into consideration his February 2012 debate with Wallace at the University of North Carolina at Chapel Hill:

Like many of you, I have many questions about the bizarre way the discussion of the so-called "First-Century Gospel of Mark" unfolded. I was intimately connected with the first announcement of the discovery, which was made precisely in order to trump me in a public debate. As it turns out, the announcement was based on false information acquired through hearsay. But that's the past, and Dan Wallace has apologized, so that is that.

Several days earlier, Wallace had given an apology on his personal blog:

In my debate with Bart, I mentioned that I had it on good authority that this was definitely a first-century fragment of Mark. A representative for who I understood was the owner of FCM urged me to make the announcement at the debate, which they realized would make this go viral. However, the information I received and was assured to have been vetted was incorrect. It was my fault for being naïve enough to trust that the data I got was unquestionable, as it was presented to me. So, I must first apologize to Bart Ehrman, and to everyone else, for giving misleading information about this discovery. While I am sorry for publicly announcing inaccurate facts, at no time in the public statements (either in the debate or on my blogsite) did I knowingly do this. But I should have been more careful about trusting any sources without my personal verification, a lesson I have since learned.

Following its publication in 2018, the Egypt Exploration Society (EES), owners of the papyrus fragment, released a statement asserting that:

- the provenance of the fragment was undisputed, having been excavated by Grenfell and Hunt in Oxyrhynchus, most probably in 1903;
- at no time since had the fragment left Oxford;
- at no time had the EES offered the fragment for sale;
- at no time had the EES imposed a non-disclosure agreement on any scholar accessing the fragment.

The EES clarified that the text in the fragment had only been recognised as being from the Gospel of Mark in 2011. In an earlier cataloguing in the 1980s by Revel Coles, the fragment had been described as 'I/II', which appeared to be the origin of the much discussed assertions of a very early date. In 2011/2012 the papyrus was in the keeping of Dirk Obbink, who had shown it to Scott Carroll, then representing the Green Collection, in connection with a proposal that it might be included in the exhibition of biblical papyri Verbum Domini at the Vatican in Lent and Easter 2012. It was not until the spring of 2016 that the EES realised that the much rumoured "First Century Mark" papyrus that had been the subject of so much speculation was one and the same as their own fragment P.Oxy. 5345; whereupon Dirk Obbink and Daniela Colomo were requested to prepare it for publication in the Oxyrhynchus Papyri series.

In June 2019 a further statement was released by the EES, following the publication by the Museum of the Bible "Scholars Initiative" director Michael Holmes of a contract between Professor Dirk Obbink and Hobby Lobby dated 17 January 2013, for the sale of a number of fragmentary texts, one of which Holmes identified as P.Oxy. LXXXIII 5345. The EES reaffirmed their previous statement that this fragment had never been offered for sale by the EES while offering the clarification that, in that statement, they had "simply reported Professor Obbink’s responses to our questions at that time, in which he insisted that he had not sold or offered for sale the Mark fragment to the Green Collection, and that he had not required Professor Wallace to sign a Non-Disclosure Agreement in relation to such a sale."

In June 2019, in a web-only article of Christianity Today, Jerry Pattengale published for the first time his own perspective on the 'First Century Mark' Saga. Pattengale states that he had been present with Scott Carroll in Dirk Obbink's rooms in Christ Church, Oxford in late 2011, when the 𝔓^{137} fragment was offered for sale to the Museum of the Bible, which Pattengale then represented. Also offered for sale were fragments of the Gospels of Matthew, Luke and John, all of which Dirk Obbink had then proposed as likely to be of a 2nd-century date; but the Mark fragment was presented as more likely 1st century. According to Pattengale, he had undertaken due diligence in showing images of the four fragments to selected New Testament textual scholars – subject to their signing non-disclosure agreements in accordance with Dirk Obbink's stipulations; and purchase was eventually finalised, with the fragments agreed to remain in Professor Obbink's possession for research prior to publication. It was not until a gala dinner in November 2017, celebrating the opening of the Museum of the Bible, that Pattengale realised that the "First Century Mark" fragment had been the property of the EES all along, and consequently had never legitimately been offered for sale.

== See also ==
- List of New Testament papyri
- Mark 1
- Oxyrhynchus Papyri
