= Brothers Poem =

Poem written by Sappho

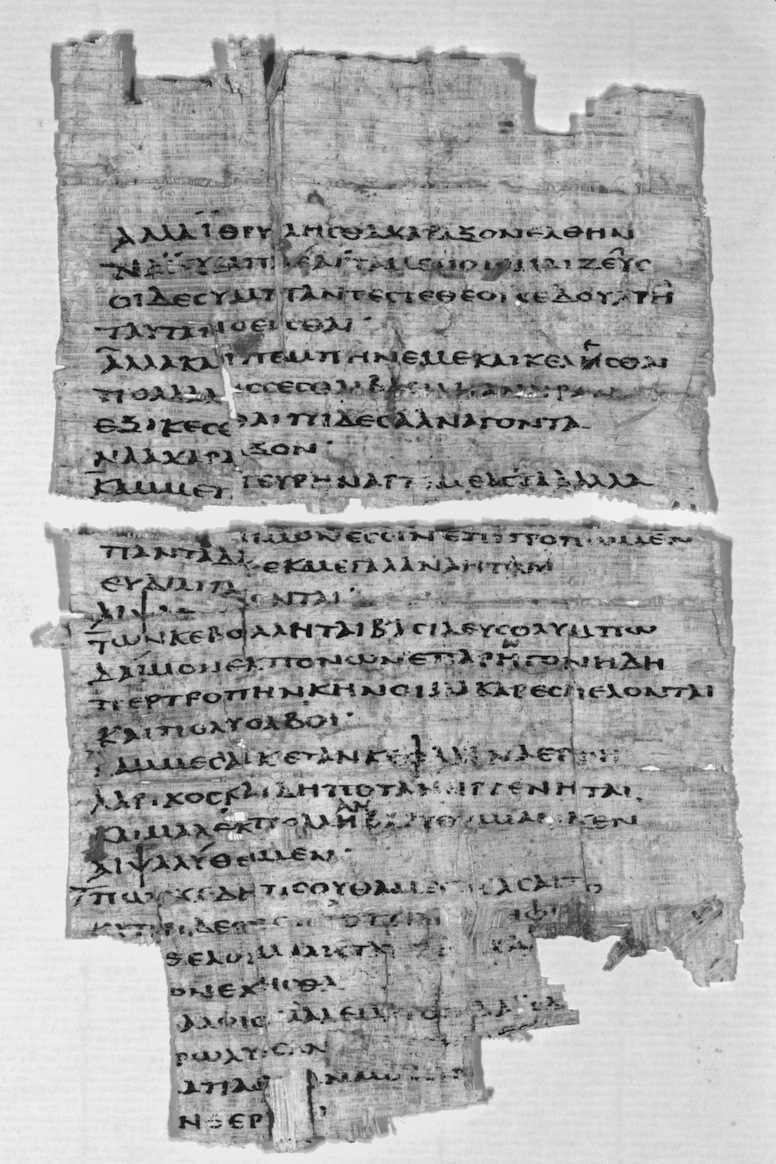
P. Sapph. Obbink: the fragment of papyrus on which the Brothers Poem was discovered

The Brothers Poem or Brothers Song (Note: Modern editions of Sappho's poetry use a numbering system based on that introduced by Edgar Lobel and Denys Page in their 1955 edition of Sappho and Alcaeus. The Brothers Poem was originally referred to by Martin West as fr. 9a. In Camillo Neri's 2021 edition, the first complete new critical edition of Sappho's poetry since the discovery, it is fr. 10. Fragment numbers for Sappho's poetry in this article are those used by Neri, which largely matches the numeration of the previous standard edition by Eva-Maria Voigt.) is a series of lines of verse attributed to the archaic Greek poet Sappho (c. 630 – c. 570 BC), which had been lost since antiquity until being rediscovered in 2014. Most of its text, apart from its opening lines, survives. It is known only from a papyrus fragment, comprising one of a series of poems attributed to Sappho. It mentions two of her brothers, Charaxos and Larichos, the only known mention of their names in Sappho's writings, though they are known from other sources. These references, and aspects of the language and style, have been used to establish her authorship.

The poem is structured as an address – possibly by Sappho herself – to an unknown person. The speaker chastises the addressee for saying repeatedly that Charaxos will return (possibly from a trading voyage), maintaining that his safety is in the hands of the gods and offering to pray to Hera for his return. The narrative then switches focus from Charaxos to Larichos, who the speaker hopes will relieve the family of their troubles when he becomes a man.

Scholars tend to view the poem's significance more in historical rather than in literary terms. Research focuses on the identities of the speaker and the addressee, and their historical groundings. Other writers examine the poem's worth in the corpus of Sappho's poetry, as well as its links with Greek epic, particularly the homecoming stories of the Odyssey. Various reconstructions of the missing opening stanzas have been offered.

== Preservation ==
Sappho is thought to have written around 10,000 lines of poetry, of which only around 650 survive. Only one poem, the Ode to Aphrodite, is known to be complete; many preserve only a single word. In 2014, Dirk Obbink, Simon Burris, and Jeffrey Fish published five fragments of papyrus, containing nine separate poems by Sappho. Three were previously unknown, (Note: Fragments 16a, 18a, and the Brothers Poem. The others overlap with the already known fragments 5, 9, 16, 17, 18, and 26.) and the find amounted to the largest expansion of the surviving corpus of Sappho's work for 92 years. The most impressive is the Brothers Poem fragment, called P. Sapph. Obbink, part of a critical edition of Book I of Sappho's poetry. (Note: The standard Alexandrian edition of Sappho's poetry was divided into nine books on the basis of their metre; Book I contained those poems composed in Sapphic stanzas.) The remaining four fragments, P. GC. inv. 105 frr. 1–4, are written in the same hand, and have the same line-spacing.

P. Sapph. Obbink measures 176 mm × 111 mm. Carbon-dating places it as between the first and third centuries AD, which is consistent with the third century AD handwriting. The roll of which P. Sapph. Obbink was part would have been produced in Alexandria, and likely taken to Fayum. There is evidence that the roll was damaged and repaired; it was later reused as cartonnage – a material similar to papier-mâché made with linen and papyrus – which Obbink suggests was used as a book cover. (Note: Cartonnage was often used for making mummy cases, and it was initially believed that the Brothers Poem fragment was from such material. However, the lack of gesso and paint traces suggest that it was in fact domestic or industrial cartonnage.) P. Sapph. Obbink preserves 20 lines of the Brothers Poem, followed by 9 lines of another work by Sappho, the Kypris Poem (fr. 26). It is, according to author and scholar James Romm, the best-preserved extant Sappho papyrus. A second papyrus, Papyrus Oxyrhynchus 2289, published by Edgar Lobel in 1951, preserves enough of the Brothers Poem to show that at least one stanza preceded the well-preserved portion.

== Provenance ==
Soon after the discovery of P. Sapph. Obbink was made public in January 2014, scholars began to raise questions about its provenance. The initial version of Obbink's article announcing the discovery said that the papyrus was in a private collection, but did not discuss its origin or ownership history, as would be usual when reporting on a newly-discovered ancient artefact; C. Michael Sampson describes this absence as "anomalous and suspicious". Archaeologists immediately criticised this lack of transparency, and the initial version of Obbink's article was soon taken down. Since then, several contradictory claims have been made about the history of P. Sapph. Obbink.

Discussions of the provenance began shortly after the announcement of the discovery in January 2014. Bettany Hughes reported in the Sunday Times that the papyrus was originally owned by a German officer, while Obbink wrote in the Times Literary Supplement that it was found in mummy cartonnage. Obbink later claimed that the German officer mentioned by Hughes was an "imaginative fantasy", and that the original belief that the papyrus had come from mummy cartonnage was due to a misidentification. Based on information contained in a brochure for a sale of the papyrus compiled by Christie's in 2015, Sampson identifies the German officer mentioned by Hughes as Ranier Kriedel and argues that this initial story was fabricated to cover for defects in the papyrus' true provenance.

In 2015, Dirk Obbink presented a second account of the provenance in a paper delivered to the Society for Classical Studies. He claimed that the papyrus derived from the collection of David Moore Robinson, who had purchased it in 1954 from an Egyptian dealer, Sultan Maguid Sameda, and on his death left it to the University of Mississippi Library. (Note: Brent Nongbri, professor of the history of religion at the MF Norwegian School of Theology, Religion and Society, suggests that Robinson in fact bequeathed the fragments to William H. Willis, then the chair of the department of classics at the University of Mississippi.) Part of the Robinson collection was offered for sale through Christie's in 2011; Obbink reported that P. Sapph. Obbink was included in this sale, and was bought by a collector in London. It was this anonymous owner who gave Obbink, the head of Oxford University's Oxyrhynchus Papyri project, access to the papyrus and permission to publish it. However the presence of the papyrus in the 2011 sale is unverifiable. In an article for Eidolon, C. Michael Sampson and Anna Uhlig observe that no documentation supporting this account has been produced, and that the evidence for it is "principally Obbink's word". Following the publication of a 2020 article by Sampson, in which he concluded that "I doubt [Obbink's 2015 account of the provenance] is true even in part", Anton Bierl and André Lardinois published a retraction to Obbink's chapter in The Newest Sappho which repeated this account, citing the "tainted" provenance, and Obbink's failure to provide a "substantive response" to Sampson's allegations. Photographs of the Green Collection fragments, apparently taken by the dealer from which the Green Collection acquired them, can be dated by their metadata to December 2011; as the Robinson papyri were not collected from Christie's by their buyer until January 2012 the Green Collection fragments cannot have been sold as part of this lot. This discrepancy by extension casts doubt on the association of P. Sapph. Obbink with this sale.

A third possible provenance was reported in 2020, when Brent Nongbri published an email from Mike Holmes, the Director of the Museum of the Bible Scholars Initiative, which revealed evidence that P. GC. inv. 105 had been sourced from Turkish antiquities dealer Yakup Eksioglu. The Atlantic reported that Eksioglu had corroborated this, and had also claimed that P. Sapph. Obbink came from his collection. In an article for the Center for Hellenic Studies, Theodore Nash concluded that the papyrus was "almost guaranteed" to be connected to Eksiolgu. According to Eksioglu, P. Sapph. Obbink and P. GC inv. 105 had been in his family collection for over a century, though he provided no documentation for this. Brian D. Hyland rejects this as "simply not believable".

Critics of the lack of transparency around the provenance of the papyrus have suggested that this is to hide a questionable origin. Sampson suggests that the accounts given in 2014 and 2015 were fabricated to conceal an undocumented – or "unmentionable" – true origin. Theodore Nash argues that "the convoluted cartonnage narrative was simply a red herring to legitimise a recently looted papyrus". Hyland suggests that the papyri might instead have been smuggled out of Egypt around 2011, during the overthrow of president Mubarak; or that they may have been among the uncatalogued papyri excavated by Grenfell and Hunt at Oxyrhynchus. Roberta Mazza, who also believes that the papyri were illegally smuggled out of Egypt, doubts that they were uncatalogued Oxyrynchus papyri, as it is unlikely that scholars working on these papyri – particularly Edgar Lobel, who was especially interested in the works of Sappho – would have failed to identify the distinctive Sapphic stanzas of P. Sapph. Obbink.

In 2013 and in 2015 P. Sapph. Obbink was privately offered for sale through Christie's. The papyrus was never bought, and remained in storage at Christie's until taken by the police in 2022. The related Green Collection fragments were returned to Egypt in 2020.

== Poem ==
=== Content ===
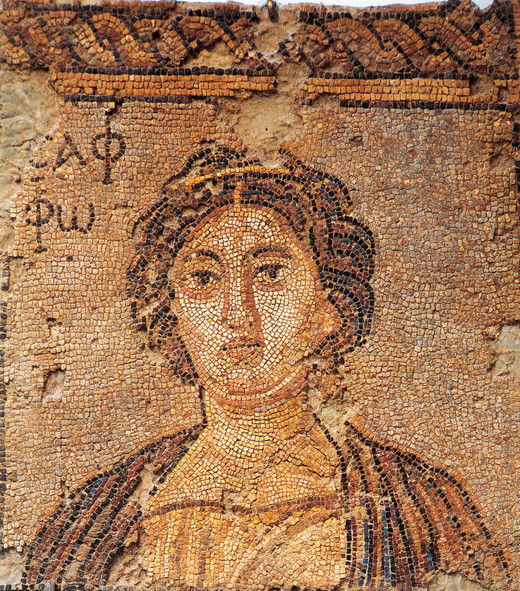
A Roman-era mosaic of Sappho from Sparta

The poem is 20 lines (five stanzas) long and written in Sapphic stanzas, a metre named after Sappho, which is composed of three long lines followed by one shorter line. The beginning of the poem is lost, but it is estimated that the complete work was probably between one and three stanzas longer. It lies within the genre of homecoming prayers; others of Sappho's works on this theme include fragments 5, 15 and 17.

The narrative consists of an address to an unnamed listener, structured in two parallel sections, concerning two of Sappho's brothers, Charaxos and Larichos. The speaker hopes that Charaxos will return successfully from a trading voyage, and that Larichos will grow into manhood, and take up his position among the elites of society in Lesbos.

The first two extant stanzas detail Charaxos' arrival. In the first, the speaker reproaches the addressee for repeatedly saying that Charaxos will return "with his ship full", that only gods can know such things, and that the addressee should send her to pray to Hera for Charaxos' safe return. The third and fourth stanzas develop into a more general examination of human dependence on gods. The speaker asserts that while human fortunes are changeable ("fair winds swiftly follow harsh gales") Zeus gives good fortune to those he favours. In the final stanza, the speaker hopes that Larichos will "[lift] his head high" and "become an ἄνηρ [man] in all senses", as Obbink puts it, and release the family from its troubles.

=== Authorship ===
When Obbink published the poem in 2014, he attributed it to Sappho based on its metre, dialect (Aeolic), and mentions of Charaxos and Larichos, both of whom are identified in other sources as her brothers. It is possible that the text is an ancient forgery; though the song was included in at least some Hellenistic editions of Sappho (from which P. Sapph. Obbink and P. Oxy. 2289 derive), a classical imitation of Sappho is still possible. Nonetheless, evidence provided by Herodotus indicates that Charaxos was mentioned in poems that were attributed to Sappho during the fifth century BC; therefore it is likely to be at least authentically from archaic Lesbos.

=== Characters ===
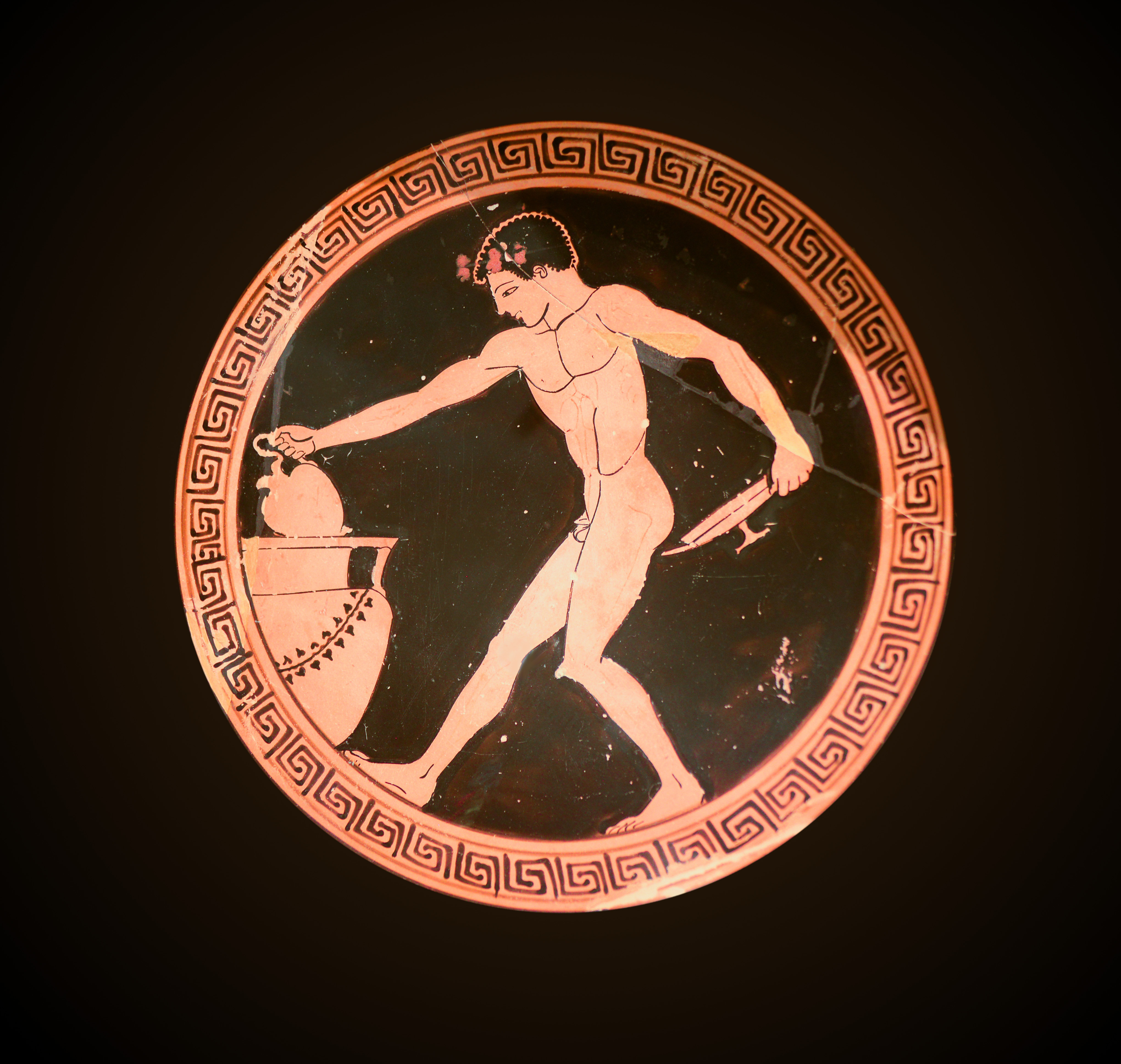
Youth pouring wine, illustrated on a red-figure cup by the Cage Painter. According to Athenaeus, Larichos was Sappho's brother, and a wine-pourer in his youth.

Neither of the two characters is named. Whether the speaker can be identified with Sappho herself is central to its interpretation. André Lardinois observes that most of the identified speakers in Sappho's poetry are female. Melissa Mueller identifies the speaker as Sappho, and the poem has generally been interpreted as being autobiographical. Not all scholars have identified the speaker with the historical Sappho; Bär and Eva Stehle both argue that the speaker is a fictionalised or literary version of Sappho. If the speaker is to be identified as Sappho, Obbink suggests that she is to be read as a young woman: her brother Larichos (who can only be six or so years younger than her, as that is how old she was when her father died, in a biographical tradition preserved in Ovid's Heroides) is shortly to come of age (Obbink puts him at around twelve); Sappho-the-speaker is therefore still a teenager herself.

The addressee of the poem is unnamed in the surviving text, but many suggestions have been made as to their identity – Camillo Neri lists eleven possible candidates. (Note: Neri's list includes: Scamondronymus, Sappho's father; Cleïs, her mother; Larichos; Erigyius, a third brother known from the ancient sources but not mentioned in the Brothers Poem; Sappho's daughter, also called Cleïs; another family member or acquaintance; a slave or nurse; Charaxos' lover Doricha/Rhodopis; Charaxos' wife or fiancée on Lesbos; the speaker's companion or companions; and Sappho herself.) Obbink suggests the most likely candidates are Rhodopis or Doricha, described in ancient sources as the lover of Charaxos, (Note: According to Herodotus, Charaxos' lover was a courtesan called Rhodopis; according to Athenaeus and Posidonius, she was called Doricha. Strabo says that she was called both Rhodopis and Doricha. It is unclear whether these are two names for the same person, or whether they were different people whom Herodotus confused.) and Sappho's mother, to whom Sappho addressed other poems. Most scholars agree that the addressee is some concerned friend or relative of Charaxos. Many (including Martin L. West, Franco Ferrari, Camillo Neri, and Leslie Kurke) select Sappho's mother as the most likely option. Giambattista d'Alessio draws parallels with other fragments of Sappho which mention a mother, particularly fragment 9, which also appears to mention a mother in association with religious ritual.

This is not universally agreed upon. The classical historian Anton Bierl argues that the central dispute of the poem is between masculine and feminine ideologies. He suggests that the speaker's offer to pray to Hera is a "solution appropriate to her gender", and contrasts with the masculine belief that the family's problems can be solved through Charaxos' pursuit of wealth. He therefore suggests that the addressee is a male relative of Sappho. Lardinois also believes that the addressee is a man: he argues that Sappho's mother could have gone to pray to Hera herself, and therefore it does not make sense for her to send Sappho on her behalf. In contrast, Mueller and Leslie Kurke both argue that the addressee is probably meant to be female, based on Sappho's use of the word θρυλέω ("chattering" or "babbling") to describe their speech. The word has negative connotations that would make Sappho unlikely to use it to address a man. Anja Bettenworth has argued that the addressee is of a lower social status than Sappho, again based on the use of θρυλέω, but Kurke argues they are likely to be in a position of authority over Sappho, as she expects them to send her to pray to Hera.

The final two characters, Charaxos and Larichos, are identified as Sappho's brothers in ancient sources. Charaxos is first mentioned by Herodotus, who describes his love for the courtesan Rhodopis; Strabo and Athenaeus say that he was a wine trader. The earliest mention of Larichos comes from Athenaeus, who says that in his youth he was a wine-pourer in the prytaneion (town hall) in Mytilene. Modern scholars are uncertain whether either was Sappho's actual brother. For instance, Lardinois sees Charaxos and Larichos as fictional characters: he draws comparisons to the poetry of Archilochus about Lycambes and his daughters, generally considered to be fictionalised. He observes that in the surviving Sapphic corpus they appear to be frozen in time – Charaxos is always absent from home and in a relationship with Doricha, and Larichos is always a young wine-pourer – which he suggests is "more suggestive of fictional characters than of real brothers".

=== Context ===
Sappho's poetry from the first book of the Alexandrian edition appears to have been about either the family and religious or cultic practices, or about passion and love. The Brothers Poem focuses on her family. Its original performance context is uncertain, but most scholars consider that it was intended for monodic performance – that is, by a single singer, rather than a chorus. As with all of Sappho's poetry the melody that would have accompanied the poem does not survive. Aristoxenus reports that Sappho used the mixolydian mode, and in antiquity she was associated with the barbitos (a stringed instrument similar to the lyre); based on this information, Armand D'Angour has set the poem to music in an attempt to reconstruct what it might have sounded like in antiquity.

Brotherhood was a frequent theme of archaic Greek poetry, and the relationship between brothers was often used to explore conceptions of proper behaviour. The Brothers Poem seems to have been one of several about Charaxos and Larichos. Eva Stehle suggests that it may have been part of a "series of 'brothers poems'", though David Gribble notes that the fragments of Sappho's work which do survive are insufficient to conclude that she composed a series telling the story of Charaxos' relationship with Doricha.

Sappho portrays Charaxos as irresponsible, with Larichos as his more respectable foil. Unlike in the versions of this trope in Homer and Hesiod, Sappho inserts a third, female, figure into the relationship. In this scheme, the figure with moral authority is unable to be the moral example to the wayward Charaxos due to her gender; she must rely on Larichos who still has the potential to become an upstanding adult. Thus, Laura Swift sees the poem as an example of Sappho reworking established epic tropes from a female perspective – as she also does in fragment 16.

Anton Bierl identifies seven other fragments of Sappho that seem to have dealt with Charaxos or Doricha. Like the Brothers Poem, fragments 5, 15, and 17 focus on homecomings; fragments 5 and 15 are both likely to be about Charaxos, and Bierl suggests that fragment 17, a cultic hymn referring to Menelaus' visit to Lesbos on his way home from Troy, may be a prayer for a safe journey for Charaxos. Four other surviving fragments of Sappho, 3, 7, 9, and 20, may all have been connected with the story of Charaxos and Doricha.

The Brothers Poem follows shortly after fragment 5 in the edition of Sappho preserved by P. Sapph. Obbink, with probably only one column of text between them. Silvio Bär argues that the poem was deliberately positioned here because it was seen as a sort of continuation of that fragment by the editor of the Alexandrian edition of Sappho's poetry. He suggests that it acts to correct the views put forward in fragment 5: there, Sappho prays to the Nereids, not just for the safe return of her brother but that "whatever his heart desires be fulfilled"; in the Brothers Poem she recognises that such a broad request is out of the competence of the Nereids and should more properly be addressed to the goddess Hera.

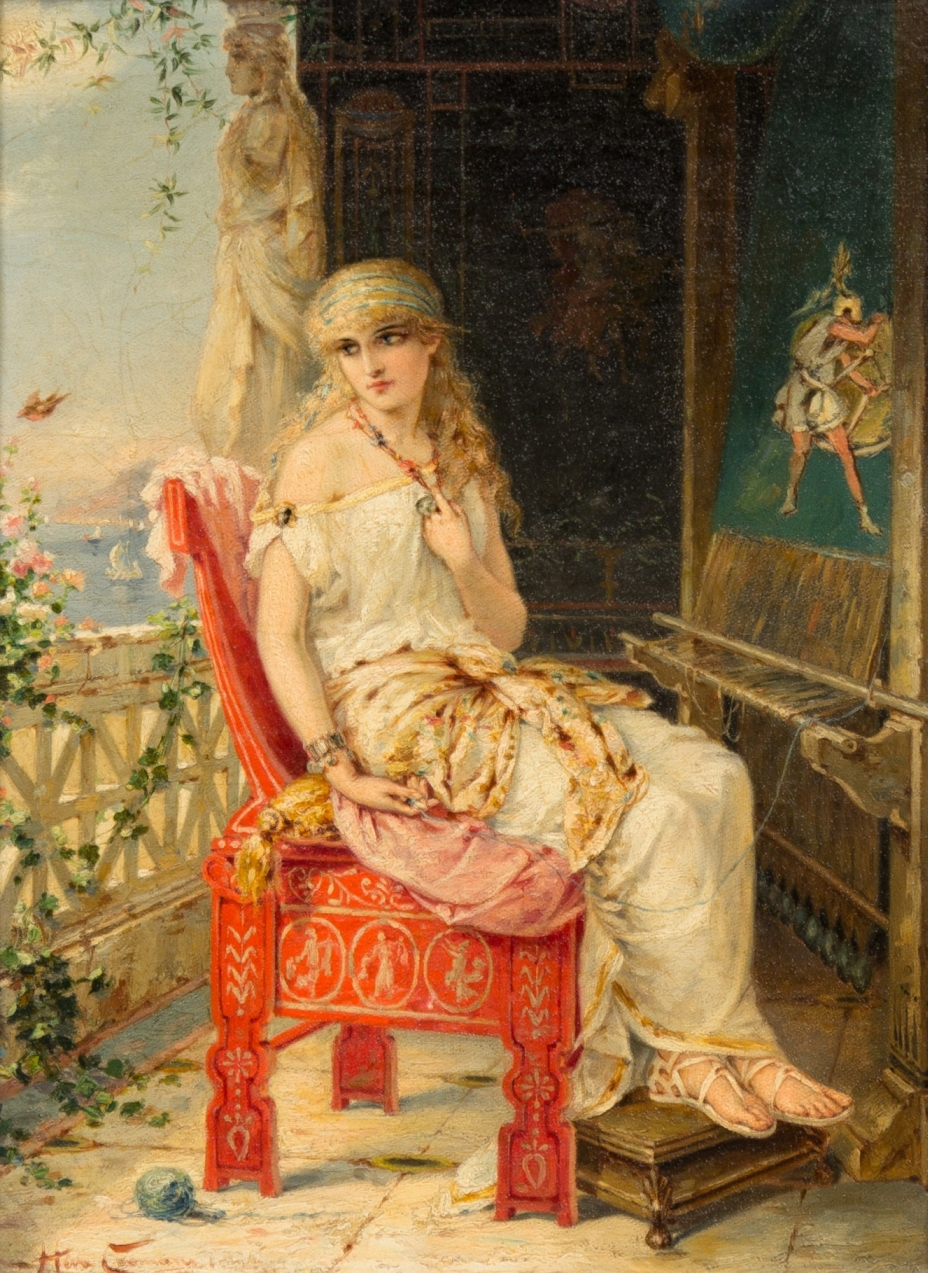
The role of the speaker (possibly Sappho herself) in the Brothers Poem has been compared to that of Penelope in the Odyssey; she awaits the return of Charaxos just as Penelope (depicted here by Heva Coomans) waits for her husband Odysseus.

Links between Homer's Odyssey and the Brothers Poem have been observed by many scholars. Bär describes the epic as a "crucial intertext" for the Brothers Poem. The relationship in the poem between the speaker, Charaxos, and Larichos parallels that of Penelope, Odysseus, and Telemachus in Homer: in the Brothers Poem, the speaker awaits Charaxos' return from overseas and Larichos' coming-of-age; in the Odyssey, Penelope awaits Odysseus' return and Telemachus' coming-of-age. Additionally, Anton Bierl suggests that the context of Charaxos' being away in Egypt – according to Herodotus, in love with the courtesan Rhodopis – parallels Odysseus' entrapment by Calypso and Circe. A specific parallel to the Odyssean homecoming narrative is found in line 9 [13]. Sappho uses the adjective ἀρτεμής ("safe"), which occurs only once in the Odyssey, at 13.43, where Odysseus hopes that he will return to Ithaca to find his family safe – just as the speaker hopes in the third stanza of the Brothers Poem that Charaxos will return to Lesbos to find his family safe.

Mueller suggests that the Brothers Poem is a deliberate reworking of the Homeric story, focusing on the fraternal relationship between Sappho and Charaxos in contrast to the conjugal one between Odysseus and Penelope. According to Anastasia-Erasmia Peponi, this should be seen in the context of an archaic Greek tradition of domestic – and specifically sisterly – discourses.

Along with stories of Odysseus' homecoming in the epic tradition, the Brothers Poem has similarities to several other genres of archaic Greek poetry. Joel Lidov sees it as being in the tradition of prayers for safe returns; Richard Martin identifies structural similarities to Archilochus' Cologne Epode (fr. 196a (Note: Fragment numbers for Archilochus' poems are given according to Martin West's enumeration in Iambi et Elegi Graeci.)), a piece of iambic invective; and Peter O'Connell suggests parallels with songs of welcome, in particular Archilochus fr. 24. André Lardinois notes parallels between Sappho's concerns about Charaxos and Hesiod's Works and Days: for instance both address the narrator's dispute with their brother, and are concerned with the risks of sea travel and trade.

=== Missing stanzas ===
How much of the Brothers Poem has been lost is unknown. An overlap between P. Oxy. 2289 and P. Sapph. Obbink, the apparent alphabetic arrangement in the Alexandrian edition of her works, (Note: The 2014 discoveries of which the Brothers Poem was a part apparently confirmed that at least the first book of the Alexandrian edition of Sappho's poetry was arranged alphabetically. Based on this, the Brothers Poem would be expected to start with a word beginning with "π".) and the implausibility of any poem beginning with the word ἀλλά (meaning "but" or "and yet"), suggest that at least one opening stanza is missing. Bär has argued against this position, noting that the overlap between the Oxyrhynchus and Obbink papyri is sufficiently small (only six characters) as not to be conclusive. He argues that there are other known exceptions to the alphabetical ordering of the first Alexandrian edition of Sappho's works, thematic reasons why the Brothers Poem might have been placed out of order to follow closely after fragment 5, and parallels elsewhere in Greek literature for an inceptive ἀλλά.

Despite Bär's arguments, most authors conclude that the Brothers Poem is missing at least one, and perhaps as many as three stanzas. Gauthier Liberman suggests that it was originally seven stanzas long; Kurke argues it is likely that only one stanza is missing. There are a variety of theories around the content of the missing stanzas. Mueller suggests that they may have revealed the identity of the addressee. Joel Lidov proposes that the latterly passive addressee actually speaks in the missing stanzas.

Obbink provides a reconstruction of a single initial stanza of the poem. He argues that the mention of Larichos in the later stanza appears too suddenly, and therefore he had probably been mentioned in earlier, now missing, lines. Athenaeus notes how Sappho often praised Larichos for being a wine-pourer in the prytaneion at Mytilene; this wine-pouring may have been mentioned here. Obbink also suggests that the opening lines originally contained a mention of the death of Sappho's father when she was young, which was the source of Ovid's anecdote at Heroides 15.61–62. Kurke has argued that the missing stanza discussed Charaxos, giving the complete poem a symmetry of three stanzas discussing each of the brothers.

== Reception ==
The discovery of the Brothers Poem, along with fragments of eight other poems – the largest discovery of new material by Sappho in almost a century – was the subject of significant media attention. James Romm, writing in The Daily Beast, called it "a spectacular literary discovery", and Tom Payne in The Daily Telegraph said that it was "more exciting than a new album by David Bowie". Other commentators expressed concern about the provenance of the papyrus, fearing that it had been illegally acquired on the black market, or even that it was a forgery like the Gospel of Jesus' Wife. Douglas Boin in The New York Times criticised the failure to discuss the papyrus' provenance properly as "disturbingly tone deaf to the legal and ethical issues". Following reports in 2019 that Obbink had illicitly sold several fragments of papyrus to Hobby Lobby, which were then donated to the Green Collection, further questions about the provenance were raised. Charlotte Higgins reported in The Guardian that "there are even doubts as to its authenticity. The latest gossip in classical circles is that it might even be a fake. 'Everything about it seems too good to be true,' one senior Cambridge classicist told me."

Though classicists considered it the "most spectacular" of the 2014 finds, it is not considered one of Sappho's best works. Martin West originally considered the work to be "very poor stuff" and "frigid juvenilia", though he later toned down his criticism. Liberman wrote that the poem is clumsy, displaying signs of hasty composition. Richard Rawles suggested that part of the reason that the poem was initially considered disappointing was because it was not about sexuality or eroticism – a factor that he predicted would make the fragment of greater interest in the future. Some commentators have been more positive. Though Loukas Papadimitropoulos said that his initial impression was that it was simplistic, he concluded that the meaning of the poem was "perhaps the most profound in all of Sappho's extant work", and that the poem turns the "simple [...] into something highly significant".

Despite scholars' disappointment over its quality, the Brothers Poem is valuable for the historical and biographical information it contains. It is the first fragment of Sappho discovered to mention the names "Charaxos" and "Larichos", both described as Sappho's brothers by ancient sources but not in any of her previously known writings. Before the poem was found, scholars had doubted that Sappho ever mentioned Charaxos.

== Works cited ==
- Bär, Silvio (2016). "'Ceci n'est pas un Fragment': Identity, Intertextuality and Fictionality in Sappho's 'Brothers Poem'". Symbolae Osloenses. 90 (1): 8–54. doi:10.1080/00397679.2016.1253259. S2CID 171358001.
- "Sappho's 'New' Poem Sung". BBC. 5 May 2015.
- Bettenworth, Anja (2014). "Sapphos Amme: Ein Beitrag zum neuen Sapphofragment (Brothers Poem)". Zeitschrift für Papyrologie und Epigraphik. 191: 15–9. JSTOR 43909575.
- Bierl, Anton (2016). "'All You Need is Love': Some Thoughts on the Structure, Texture, and Meaning of the Brothers Song as well as on Its Relationship to the Kypris Song (P. Sapph. Obbink)". In Bierl, Anton; Lardinois, André (eds.). The Newest Sappho: P. Sapph. Obbink and P. GC inv. 105, frs.1–4. Leiden: Brill. pp. 302–336. ISBN 978-90-04-31483-2.
- Bierl, Anton; Lardinois, André (2016). "Introduction". In Bierl, Anton; Lardinois, André (eds.). The Newest Sappho: P. Sapph. Obbink and P. GC inv. 105, frs.1–4. Leiden: Brill. pp. 1–9. ISBN 978-90-04-31483-2.
- Bierl, Anton; Lardinois, André (2021). "Retraction Notice". In Bierl, Anton; Lardinois, André (eds.). The Newest Sappho: P. Sapph. Obbink and P. GC inv. 105, frs.1–4. Leiden: Brill. ISBN 978-90-04-31483-2.
- Boedecker, Deborah (2016). "Hera and the Return of Charaxos". In Bierl, Anton; Lardinois, André (eds.). The Newest Sappho: P. Sapph. Obbink and P. GC inv. 105, frs.1–4. Leiden: Brill. pp. 188–207. ISBN 978-90-04-31483-2.
- Boin, Douglas (2 March 2014). "Papyrus, Provenance and Looting". The New York Times.
- Childers, Christopher (2016). "'Brothers' and Others: New Sappho Poems". New Criterion. 34 (6): 26–31.
- d'Alessio, Giambattista (2018). "Fiction and Pragmatics in Ancient Greek Lyric". In Budelmann, Felix; Phillips, Tom (eds.). Textual Events: Performance and Lyric in Early Greece. Vol. 1. Oxford: Oxford University Press. doi:10.1093/oso/9780198805823.001.0001. ISBN 978-0-19-880582-3.
- de Kreij, Mark (2016). "Ουκ εστι Σαπφους τουτο το ασμα: Variants of Sappho's Songs in Athenaeus' Deipnosophistae". Journal of Hellenic Studies. 136: 59–72. doi:10.1017/S0075426916000057.
- Gannon, Megan (23 January 2015). "Sappho's New Poems: The Tangled Tale of Their Discovery". Live Science.
- Gribble, David (2016). "Getting Ready to Pray: Sappho's New 'Brothers' Song". Greece & Rome. 63 (1): 29–68. doi:10.1017/S0017383515000248. S2CID 163406443.
- Higgins, Charlotte (9 January 2020). "A scandal in Oxford: the curious case of the stolen gospel". The Guardian. Archived from the original on 10 January 2020.
- Hughes, Bettany (2 February 2014). "Lover, Poet, Muse: A Ghost Made Real". The Sunday Times. Archived from the original on 10 November 2019.
- Hyland, Brian D. (2021). "A Note on the Provenance of the Sappho Fragments P.GC. inv. 105". Zeitschrift für Papyrologie und Epigraphik. 218.
- Kurke, Leslie (2016). "Gendered Spheres and Mythic Models in Sappho's Brothers Poem". In Bierl, Anton; Lardinois, André (eds.). The Newest Sappho: P. Sapph. Obbink and P. GC inv. 105, frs.1–4. Leiden: Brill. pp. 238–265. ISBN 978-90-04-31483-2.
- Lardinois, André (2016). "Sappho's Brothers Song and the Fictionality of Early Greek Lyric Poetry". In Bierl, Anton; Lardinois, André (eds.). The Newest Sappho: P. Sapph. Obbink and P. GC inv. 105, frs.1–4. Leiden: Brill. pp. 167–187. ISBN 978-90-04-31483-2.
- Lardinois, André (2021). "Sappho's Personal Poetry". In Finglass, P. J.; Kelly, Adrian (eds.). The Cambridge Companion to Sappho. Cambridge: Cambridge University Press. ISBN 978-1-316-63877-4.
- Liberman, Gauthier (2014). Reflections on a New Poem by Sappho Concerning her Anguish and her Brothers Charaxos and Larichos (PDF). FIEC. Translated by Ellis, Paul. Bordeaux.
- Lidov, Joel (2016). "Songs for Sailors and Lovers". In Bierl, Anton; Lardinois, André (eds.). The Newest Sappho: P. Sapph. Obbink and P. GC inv. 105, frs.1–4. Leiden: Brill. pp. 55–109. ISBN 978-90-04-31483-2.
- Martin, Richard P. (2016). "Sappho, Iambist: Abusing the Brother". In Bierl, Anton; Lardinois, André (eds.). The Newest Sappho: P. Sapph. Obbink and P. GC inv. 105, frs.1–4. Leiden: Brill. pp. 110–126. ISBN 978-90-04-31483-2.
- Mazza, Roberta (2024). Stolen Fragments: Black Markets, Bad Faith, and the Illicit Trade in Ancient Artefacts. Stanford, California: Redwood Press. ISBN 978-1503632509.
- Mueller, Melissa (2016). "Re-Centering Epic Nostos: Gender and Genre in Sappho's Brothers Poem". Arethusa. 49 (1): 25–46. doi:10.1353/are.2016.0004. S2CID 162664480.
- Nash, Theodore (November 2020). "Looting and Faking". Center for Hellenic Studies. Archived from the original on 25 August 2021.
- Neri, Camillo (2015). "Il Brothers Poem e l'edizione alessandrina (in margine a P. Sapph. Obbink)". Eikasmos (in Italian). 26: 53–76. doi:10.2307/jj.32155425.6.
- Neri, Camillo, ed. (2021). "Saffo - testimonianze e frammenti: Introduzione, testo critico, traduzione e commento". Saffo: Testimonianze e Frammenti (in Italian). de Gruyter. doi:10.1515/9783110735918. ISBN 9783110735918. S2CID 239602934.
- Nongbri, Brent (2017). "Further Details on the Robinson Papyri". Variant Readings. Archived from the original on 29 May 2019.
- Nongbri, Brent (3 August 2019). "Dirk Obbink, Scott Carroll, and Sappho". Variant Readings. Archived from the original on 8 November 2019.
- Nongbri, Brent (29 January 2020). "Important Developments with the New Sappho Papyrus". Variant Readings. Archived from the original on 25 August 2021.
- Obbink, Dirk (2014). "Two New Poems by Sappho". Zeitschrift für Papyrologie und Epigraphik. 189: 32–49. JSTOR 23850358.
- Obbink, Dirk (2015a). "Interim Notes on 'Two New Poems of Sappho'". Zeitschrift für Papyrologie und Epigraphik. 194: 1–8. JSTOR 43909704.
- Obbink, Dirk (2015b). Provenance, Authority, and Text of the New Sappho Papyri (PDF). Society for Classical Studies: New Fragments of Sappho. New Orleans. Archived from the original (PDF) on 23 July 2017.
- Obbink, Dirk (2016). "Goodbye Family Gloom! The Coming of Charaxos in the Brothers Song". In Bierl, Anton; Lardinois, André (eds.). The Newest Sappho: P. Sapph. Obbink and P. GC inv. 105, frs.1–4. Leiden: Brill. pp. 208–224. ISBN 978-90-04-31483-2.
- O'Connell, Peter A. (2018). "'Charaxus Arrived with a Full Ship!' The Poetics of Welcome in Sappho's Brothers Song and the Charaxus Song Cycle". Classical Antiquity. 37 (2): 236–266. doi:10.1525/ca.2018.37.2.236. S2CID 149961744.
- Papadimitropoulos, Loukas (2016). "Sappho's 'Brothers Poem': An Interpretation". Symbolae Osloenses. 90 (1): 2–7. doi:10.1080/00397679.2016.1240960. S2CID 171386109.
- Payne, Tom (30 January 2014). "A New Sappho Poem is More Exciting Than a New David Bowie Album". The Daily Telegraph. Archived from the original on 21 September 2017.
- Peponi, Anastasia-Erasmia (2016). "Sappho and the Mythopoetics of the Domestic". In Bierl, Anton; Lardinois, André (eds.). The Newest Sappho: P. Sapph. Obbink and P. GC inv. 105, frs.1–4. Leiden: Brill. pp. 225–237. ISBN 978-90-04-31483-2.
- Prauscello, Lucia (2021). "The Alexandrian Edition of Sappho". In Finglass, P. J.; Kelly, Adrian (eds.). The Cambridge Companion to Sappho. Cambridge: Cambridge University Press. ISBN 978-1-316-63877-4.
- Rawles, Richard (12 February 2014). "New Sappho: Not For Valentine's Day!". University of Nottingham Blogs. Archived from the original on 27 August 2017.
- Rayor, Diane; Lardinois, André (2014). Sappho: A New Translation of the Complete Works. Cambridge: Cambridge University Press. ISBN 978-1-107-02359-8.
- Romm, James (28 January 2014). "Scholars Discover New Poems from Ancient Greek Poetess Sappho". The Daily Beast.
- Sabar, Ariel (June 2020). "A Biblical Mystery at Oxford". The Atlantic.
- Sachs, Rioghnach (2019). "Transgressing Translations: Interpreting Ancient Lesbian Texts as Anglican Hymns" (PDF). Journal of Languages, Texts and Society. 3.
- Sampson, C. Michael (2020). "Deconstructing the Provenances of P.Sapph.Obbink". Bulletin of the American Society of Papyrologists. 57. doi:10.2143/BASP.57.0.3288503.
- Sampson, C. Michael; Uhlig, Anna (5 November 2019). "The Murky Provenance of the Newest Sappho". Eidolon. Archived from the original on 8 November 2019.
- Stehle, Eva (2016). "Larichos in the Brothers Poem: Sappho Speaks Truth to the Wine-Pourer". In Bierl, Anton; Lardinois, André (eds.). The Newest Sappho: P. Sapph. Obbink and P. GC inv. 105, frs.1–4. Leiden: Brill. pp. 266–292. ISBN 978-90-04-31483-2.
- Swift, Laura (30 January 2014). "New Sappho Poems Set Classical World Reeling". The Conversation. Archived from the original on 8 April 2017.
- Swift, Laura (2018). "Thinking with Brothers in Sappho and Beyond" (PDF). Mouseion: Journal of the Classical Association of Canada. 5 (1): 71–87. doi:10.3138/mous.15.1.6. S2CID 165679812.
- West, Martin L. (2014). "Nine Poems of Sappho". Zeitschrift für Papyrologie und Epigraphik. 191: 1–12. JSTOR 43909573.
