= Ymagines Fulgencii =

Reference work

Cupidity and Avarice personified, from the illustrated copy in Pal. lat. 1066

The Ymagines Fulgencii ('Images of Fulgentius') is a 14th-century Latin reference work of mythography, containing "descriptions of the representations of diverse mythological and allegorical figures."

== Content ==
The Ymagines begins with the words Refert Fulgentius de ornatu orbis, referring to a nonexistent work of Fulgentius as its source. In fact, it is derived only indirectly from Fulgentius' authentic Mythologicon via John Ridewall's commentary, Fulgentius metaforalis. There is an abridged copy of the Fulgentius metaforalis (Vatican, Reg. lat. 453), dating to the late 14th century and probably produced in France, which may represent "the first step of the process which eventually produced the complete Ymagines".

In its complete form, the Ymagines contains 33 chapters, the last sixteen derived from the Fulgentius metaforalis. The first seventeen are:

1. Jupiter (with three wings)
2. Reason
3. Charity
4. Friendship
5. Three Graces
6. Jupiter (as the sun)
7. Virgo
8. Earth
9. Woman
10. Mortal sin
11. Vanity
12. Love
13. Cerberus
14. Fortune
15. Tripartite life of man (Juno, Minerva and Venus)
16. Chimera
17. Liber

== Manuscripts ==
Vanity personified in Pal. lat. 1066

The Ymagines is found in many manuscripts, frequently alongside Robert Holcot's Moralitates and in some cases even misattributed to Holcot. Nobody has yet catalogued all the manuscripts of the Ymagines. Among the known manuscripts containing the Ymagines in whole or in part are:

- Bordeaux, Bibliothèque municipale, 267
- Heidelberg, Universitätsbibliothek, Cod. Sal., VII, 104
- London, British Museum, Additional 21429
- Madrid, Biblioteca de la Universidad, 111
- Paris, Bibliothèque Mazarine, 986
- Paris, Bibliothèque nationale de France, Latin 590, the oldest copy
- Troyes, Bibliothèque municipale, 1701
- Vatican City, Biblioteca Apostolica, Pal. lat. 159
- Vatican City, Biblioteca Apostolica, Pal. lat. 1066 (fols. 235r–243v), which also contains the Fulgentius metaforalis (fols. 217v–231v)
- Vatican City, Biblioteca Apostolica, Pal. lat. 1726
- Vatican City, Biblioteca Apostolica, Vat. lat. 4347

In the Heidelberg manuscript and Pal. lat. 1066, the order of figures is different.

== Bibliography ==
- Allen, Judson Boyce (1979). "Commentary as Criticism: The Text, Influence, and Literary Theory of the Fulgentius Metaphored of John Ridewall". In P. Tuynman; G. C. Kuiper; E. Kessler (eds.). Acta Conventus Neo-Latini Amstelodamensis. Fink Verlag. pp. 25–47.
- Piqueras Yagüe, Pablo (2023). "Search of Sources of Bersuire's Ovidius moralizatus after Two Illuminated Passages". Il Capitale Culturale: Studies on the Value of Cultural Heritage (Supplementi 15): 69–104. doi:10.13138/2039-2362/3271.
