= GTJ =

GTJ may refer to:

- Galápagos triple junction, a geological area in the eastern Pacific Ocean
- Grace Theological Journal, a defunct academic journal published by Grace Theological Seminary
