= Purpose-guided education =

Purpose-guided education prioritizes intrinsic motivation and helps students become more engaged in learning experiences through connecting their beliefs and life goals to curricular requirements. Jerry Pattengale first coined the phrase "purpose-guided education", and began its usage at Indiana Wesleyan University in 1997. The graduation rates increased over 20% over the following ten years, and ensuing publications, collaborative research projects, and other scholarly activities gained national attention. The Center for Life Calling and Leadership is perhaps the most visible manifestation of this educational philosophy. Key books include Why I Teach, The Purpose-Guided Student, The Explorer's Guide, and the basic thesis of Educating Students Purposefully. Pattengale began questioning aspects of the prevailing approach to student success, as noted in "Student Success or Student Non-Dissatisfaction". Through surveying over 400 institutions he discovered that over 90% of them based their student success approach on student satisfaction surveys and external issues instead of intrinsic motivation. The original usage of this student success approach is found in The Purpose-Guided Student.

== As a response to limited student success models ==
Pattengale says that "Students are most at-risk when they have no clear understanding of the relevance of college to life after or outside of college. It is important to help alleviate obstacles to educational pursuits, and to address areas of dissatisfaction." A fundamental objective should be for students to learn about their values and develop a sense of purpose. He argues that this sense of direction will overshadow dissatisfaction and help to sustain them in their challenges. This notion is similar to the maxim of the late Chip Anderson, co-author of Gallup's StrengthsQuest, "If the Why is big enough, the How will show up."

The application of purpose-guided education to the college student success discussion reflects a general theme among recent best-sellers and trends.

A battery of popular books reflects this idea of "beginning with the end in mind," as Steven Covey champions in his Seven Habits for Highly Successful People. An increasing number of teachers and professors are shoving aside mainstay "student success" curriculum and making room for this Coveyistic genre. Themes throughout the texts of popular writers like John Maxwell, "Dr. Phil" and Parker Palmer imbibe this notion of "alignment," or "merging" a person's core with an articulated life purpose. Likewise, Alfie Kohn's provocative best-seller, Punished by Rewards, candidly chastises educators for focusing on external issues and incentives instead of intrinsic concerns. Denise Clark Pope's Doing School likewise challenges the current educational steps to academic "success", a notion also implied in My Freshman Year.

== Purpose in the history of education ==
Pattengale notes is that Purpose-Guided Education reclaims the foundational tenets of education. Socrates' mantra was that "The unexamined life is not worth living." This examination, as outlined in The Purpose-Guided Student, needs to occur against the backdrop of questions about the human condition, similar to those raised in the classics, and in recent thoughtful works dealing with the same. This need for a knowledge base in the purpose-guided model, making the best decisions based on the best available information, is endorsed in many corners of higher education. For example, Robert Maynard Hutchins, closely associated with the Great Books movement, was wary of any social or institutional commitments fueled by zeal without knowledge, and the latter came most notably through a study of the great thinkers through the ages, in the "great conversation." In 1970, he cautioned educators:

It is the absence of anything relevant in the current program of the multiversity that has produced this demand for relevance on the part of the young. When young people are asked, "What are you interested in?" they answer that they are interested in justice, they want justice for the Negro, they want justice for the Third World. If you say, "Well, what is justice?" they haven't any idea …. They are ignorant of the fact that there is a Great Conversation echoing back through history on the subject of justice.

During the Middle Ages the trivium and quadrivium provided the curricular knowledge base to study theology, "the Queen of the sciences." Students were preparing to understand more fully their place in this world, and doing so through a deeper understanding of a higher (supernatural) power. In today's universities, as UCLA's H.E.R.I. reports on spirituality outline, the majority of students in the first decade of the 21st century place top importance on spirituality, though the shift has changed considerably from the Judeo-Christian version to a more general spirituality. Nonetheless, there is a heightened interest (like the Middle Ages) in understanding one's place in this world. Numerous studies are trying to find the place once again in education for these metaphysical questions in the curriculum, and while there is a common theme among these "Why" questions, there is a wide range of suggested solutions. Some recent studies want to merely raise the questions, like Anthony Kronman's Education's End: Why Our Colleges and Universities Have Given Up on the Meaning of Life. While this basic question resonates with purpose-guided education, Kronman's solutions differ drastically. It is argued that they do not providing a format for students to find, articulate and pursue their life purpose after the questions are raised. Recent scholarly works more aligned with purpose-guided education are Christian Smith's Soul Searching: The Religious and Spiritual Lives of America's Teenagers and The Schooled Heart: Moral Formation in American Higher Education by Douglas Henry and Michael Beaty.

== At Indiana Wesleyan University ==
During the 1980s, considerable focus in education was placed on a student's vocation (instead of career) and aligning life goals with curricular choices instead of following traditional majors without understanding one's passions. Many schools, like Indiana Wesleyan University, began to focus on "whole-person development," and became ripe for the research and development of a coherent educational philosophy based on the notion of purpose. The Lilly Endowment, Inc. funded a major Program for the Theological Exploration of Vocation initiative for universities to assist with helping students to understand better their life calling, or vocation. Indiana Wesleyan University was one of the recipients of these grants, and the $5 million grant helped with the intense research and development underpinning purpose-guided education, and especially with the founding of the Center for Life Calling and Leadership, a general education curriculum with "Becoming Worldchangers" as its main course, a humanities-based first-year seminar. The entire education experience at Indiana Wesleyan is based on "World Changing Outcomes", involves learning experiences involving both faculty and student development, and includes a Dean of Mentoring and a Mentor Residence Hall.

A longevity study of 1700 students conducted in conjunction with Indiana University's Research Center validated the value of the purpose-guided curriculum, with positive odds ratios for every cohort studied, and some as high as 12% more likely to succeed than those not in the purpose-guided track. Today, all IWU students go through some key aspect of the purpose-guided programs. Four key purpose-guided initiatives converged to aid student success efforts, and simultaneously to garner selection among the twelve "founding" (original) institutions in the Foundations of Excellence project. These included the mentoring program, the first-year seminar, the Center for Life Calling and Leadership, and most recently, the Mentoring Hall. A dean and associate dean of mentoring were added in 1999 and 2001. The first-year seminar is required of all new students, included transfers. The Center for Life Calling and Leadership, with the aid of the Lilly Endowment, has become a true local, community, and national center. It provides a variety of services, including a curriculum and advising for all pre-declared students.

== See also ==
- Career
- Motivation
- University student retention
