= Daniel B. Wallace =

American Bible scholar and academic

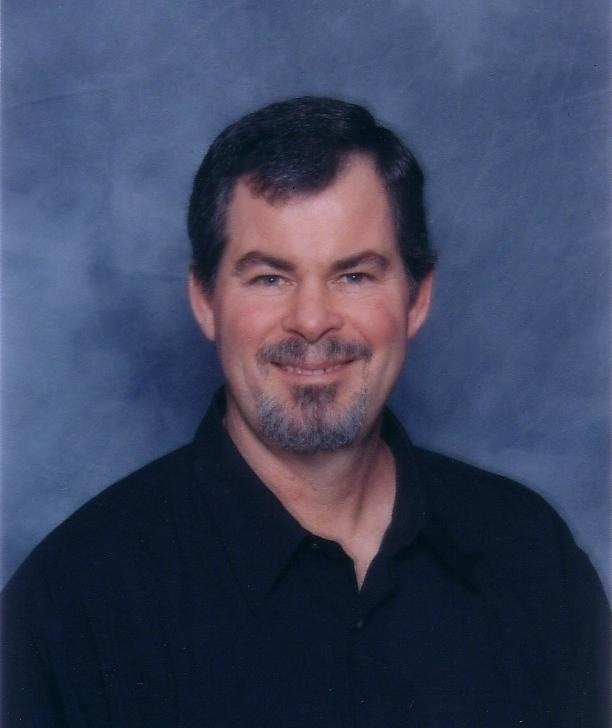
- Professor Wallace in 2004
- Born: Daniel Baird Wallace; June 5, 1952 (age 74); California
- Occupation: Professor of New Testament

Academic background
- Education: Biola University (B.A., 1975); Dallas Theological Seminary (Th.M., 1979; Ph.D., 1995)

Academic work
- Discipline: New Testament textual criticism, Koine Greek grammar
- School or tradition: Evangelical Christian textual critic
- Institutions: Dallas Seminary; Grace Theological Seminary
- Main interests: New Testament authentication, early Christian writings, Koine Greek grammar
- Website: danielbwallace.com

Daniel Baird Wallace (born June 5, 1952) is an American professor of New Testament Studies at Dallas Theological Seminary. He is also the founder and executive director of the Center for the Study of New Testament Manuscripts, the purpose of which is digitizing all known Greek manuscripts of the New Testament via digital photographs.

== Early life ==
Wallace was born in June 1952, in California. He earned his B.A. (1975) from Biola University, and his Th.M. (1979) and Ph.D. (1995) in New Testament studies from Dallas Theological Seminary. He also pursued postdoctoral studies in a variety of places, including in Cambridge at Tyndale House, Christ's College, Clare College, and Westminster College, in Germany at the Institute for New Testament Textual Research, University of Tübingen, and the Bavarian State Library, and at the National Library of Greece in Athens.

== Career ==
Wallace began his academic career teaching at Dallas Seminary from 1979 until 1981 and then at Grace Theological Seminary from 1981 until 1983, before returning to Dallas where he has been tenured since 1995. He published his first edition of Greek Grammar Beyond The Basics in 1996. It has since become a standard work in the field and has been translated into half a dozen languages. Two-thirds of schools that teach the subject use the textbook. He also has served as senior New Testament editor for the NET Bible and has founded the Center for the Study of New Testament Manuscripts. In 2016 he was the president of the Evangelical Theological Society. In 2019 he joined the Committee on Bible Translation which is responsible for the NIV.

== Views ==
Wallace, along with DTS colleague Darrell L. Bock, has been an outspoken critic of the alleged "popular culture" quest to discredit conservative evangelical views of Jesus—including the writings of Elaine Pagels and Bart Ehrman. He is a contributor to the Ehrman Project, a website that critiques the writings of Bart Ehrman. Wallace critiqued Ehrman's Misquoting Jesus: The Story of Who Changed the Bible and Why for misrepresenting commonly held views of textual criticism, especially in Ehrman's view of the "orthodox corruption of Scripture." Wallace and Ehrman dialogued at the Greer-Heard Point-Counterpoint Forum in April 2008, at Southern Methodist University in October 2011, and again at UNC Chapel Hill in February 2012. Wallace holds to Calvinist theology and cessationism.

== "First Century Mark" Controversy ==
In 2012 Wallace claimed that a recently identified papyrus fragment of the Gospel of Mark had been definitively dated by papyrologist, Dirk Obbink, to the late first century, and would shortly be published by E.J. Brill. The fragment might consequently be the earliest surviving Christian text. This claim resulted in widespread speculation on social media and in the press as to the fragment's content, provenance, and date, exacerbated by Wallace's inability to give any further details due to a non-disclosure agreement. The fragment, designated Papyrus 137 and subsequently dated by its editors to the later 2nd or earlier 3rd century, was eventually published in 2018, in the series of Oxyrhynchus Papyri LXXXIII. After the publication, Daniel Wallace confirmed that Papyrus 137 was indeed the fragment that he had been referring to, and that he had signed a non-disclosure agreement at the request of Jerry Pattengale, then representing the Museum of the Bible in its efforts to purchase this particular fragment; efforts that proved unavailing, as all the time it had been in the ownership of the Egypt Exploration Society, and had not legitimately been offered for sale.

== Works ==
=== Books ===
- Wallace, Daniel B. (1996). Greek Grammar Beyond the Basics: An Exegetical Syntax of New Testament Greek. Grand Rapids, MI: Zondervan. ISBN 978-0-310-21895-1. OCLC 37227757.
- ——— (2000). The Basics of New Testament Syntax: An Intermediate Grammar. Grand Rapids, MI: Zondervan. ISBN 0-310-23229-5. OCLC 43684564.
- ———; Sawyer, M. James, eds. (2005). Who's Afraid of the Holy Spirit? An Investigation into the Ministry of the Spirit of God Today. Dallas, TX: Biblical Studies Press. ISBN 978-0-737-50068-4. OCLC 62866519.
- ———; Komoszewski, J. Ed; Sawyer, M. James (2006). Reinventing Jesus: How Contemporary Skeptics Miss the Real Jesus and Mislead Popular Culture. Grand Rapids, MI: Kregel Publications. ISBN 0-8254-2982-X.
- ———; Bock, Darrell L. (2007). Dethroning Jesus: Exposing Popular Culture's Quest to Unseat the Biblical Christ. Nashville, TN: Thomas Nelson. ISBN 978-0-7852-2615-4.
- ———; Edwards, Grant G. (2007). A Workbook for New Testament Syntax: companion to Basics of New Testament syntax and Greek grammar beyond the basics: an exegetical syntax of the New Testament. Grand Rapids, MI: Zondervan. ISBN 978-0-310-27389-9. OCLC 154666705.
- ——— (2009). Granville Sharp's Canon and its Kin: semantics and significance. Studies in Biblical Greek. Vol. 14. New York: Peter Lang. ISBN 978-0-820-43342-4. OCLC 213408489.
- ——— (2011). Revisiting the Corruption of the New Testament: Manuscript, Patristic, and Apocryphal Evidence. Text and Canon of the New Testament. Grand Rapids, MI: Kregel Academic. ISBN 978-0825433382.
- ———; Burnette, Brittany C.; Moore, Terri Darby (2013). A Reader's Lexicon of the Apostolic Fathers. Grand Rapids, MI: Kregel Academic. ISBN 978-0-825-43949-0. OCLC 860757187.

=== Chapters ===
- ——— (1991). "Inspiration, Preservation, and New Testament Textual Criticism". In Meadors, Gary T. (ed.). New Testament Essays in Honor of Homer A. Kent, Jr. Winona Lake, IN: BMH Books. pp. 69–102. ISBN 978-0-884-69231-7.
- ——— (1994). "The Majority Text Theory: History, Methods, and Critique". In Ehrman, Bart D.; Holmes, Michael W. (eds.). The Text of the New Testament in Contemporary Research: Essays on the Status Quaestionis. Studies and Documents. Vol. 46. Grand Rapids, MI: Eerdmans. pp. 297–320. ISBN 978-9-004-25840-2.
- ——— (2005). "Introduction: Who's Afraid of the Holy Spirit? - The Uneasy Conscience of a Non-Charismatic Evangelical". In ———; Sawyer, M. James (eds.). Who's Afraid of the Holy Spirit? An Investigation into the Ministry of the Spirit of God Today. Dallas, TX: Biblical Studies Press. pp. 1–14. ISBN 978-0-737-50068-4. OCLC 62866519.
- ——— (2005). "The Witness of the Spirit in Romans 8:16: Interpretation and Implications". In ———; Sawyer, M. James (eds.). Who's Afraid of the Holy Spirit? An Investigation into the Ministry of the Spirit of God Today. Dallas, TX: Biblical Studies Press. pp. 37–52. ISBN 978-0-737-50068-4. OCLC 62866519.
- ——— (1997). "A Scripture Index". In Moulton, James Hope; Milligan, George (eds.). Vocabulary of the Greek Testament (Modern reprint ed.). Peabody, MA: Hendrickson. ISBN 9781565632714.
- ——— (2006). "Laying a Foundation: New Testament Textual Criticism". In Bock, Darrell L.; Fanning, Buist M. (eds.). Interpreting the New Testament Text: Introduction to the Art and Science of Exegesis: a Festschrift for Harold Hoehner. Wheaton, IL: Crossway Books. pp. 33–56. ISBN 978-1-581-34408-0.
- ———; Ehrman, Bart D. (2011). "The Textual Reliability of the New Testament: a dialogue". In Stewart, Robert B. (ed.). The reliability of the New Testament. Minneapolis, MN: Fortress Press. ISBN 978-0-800-69773-0. OCLC 646121910.

=== Journal articles ===
- ——— (1983). "The Semantic Range of the Article-Noun-kai-Noun Plural Construction in the New Testament". Grace Theological Journal. 4: 59–84.
- ——— (1984). "The Relation of Adjective to Noun in Anarthrous Constructions in the New Testament". Novum Testamentum. 26: 128–167. doi:10.1163/156853684X00293.
- ——— (1985). "The Semantics and Exegetical Significance of the Object - Complement Construction in the New Testament". Grace Theological Journal. 6: 91–112.
- ——— (1989). "The Majority Text : A New Collating Base?". New Testament Studies. 35 (4): 609–618. doi:10.1017/S0028688500015241. S2CID 170703623.
- ——— (1989). "Orgizesthe in Ephesians 4:26 : Command or Condition?". Criswell Theological Review. 3: 353–372.
- ——— (1989). "Some Second Thoughts on the Majority Text". Bibliotheca Sacra. 146: 270–290.
- ——— (1990). "John 5,2 and the Date of the Fourth Gospel". Biblica. 71 (2): 177–205.
- ——— (1990). "Galatians 3:19-20 : A Crux Interpretum for Paul's View of the Law". Westminster Theological Journal. 52: 225–245.
- ——— (1990). "A Textual Problem in 1 Thessalonians 1:10 : Ek Tēs Orgēs Vs Apo Tēs Orgēs". Bibliotheca Sacra. 147: 470–479.
- ——— (1991). "Inspiration, Preservation, and New Testament Textual Criticism". Grace Theological Journal. 12: 21–50.
- ——— (1991). "The Majority Text and the Original Text : Are They Identical?". Bibliotheca Sacra. 148: 151–169.
- ——— (1992). "Inspiration, Preservation, and New Testament Textual Criticism". Grace Theological Journal. 12 (1): 21–51. - (reprint of article in Homer Kent's Festschrift [see above])
- ——— (1993). "Reconsidering "The Story of Jesus and the Adulteress Reconsidered". New Testament Studies. 39 (2): 290–296. doi:10.1017/S0028688500022852. S2CID 170366837.
- ——— (1994). "7Q5 : The Earliest NT Papyrus?". Westminster Theological Journal. 56 (1): 173–180.
- ——— (June 1994). "The Majority-Text Theory : History, Methods and Critique". Journal of the Evangelical Theological Society. 37 (2): 185–215.
- ——— (1994). "A Review of The Earliest Gospel Manuscript? by Carsten Peter Thiede". Bibliotheca Sacra. 151: 350–354.
- ——— (1994). "Who's Afraid of the Holy Spirit? The Uneasy Conscience of a Noncharismatic Evangelical". Christianity Today. 38: 34–38.
- ——— (1995). "Historical Revisionism and the Majority Text Theory : The Cases of F H A Scrivener and Herman C Hoskier". New Testament Studies. 41 (2): 280–285. doi:10.1017/S0028688500021299. S2CID 162203178.
- ——— (1996). "Review of 'Levels of Constituent Structure in New Testament Greek.'". Critical Review of Books in Religion. 9: 249–251.
- ——— (1998). "Granville Sharp : A Model of Evangelical Scholarship and Social Activism". Journal of the Evangelical Theological Society. 41: 591–613.
- ———; Burer, Michael H. (January 2001). "Was Junia Really an Apostle? a Re-examination of Rom 16.7". New Testament Studies. 47 (1): 76–91.
- ——— (2001). "Innovations in Text and Translation of the NET Bible, New Testament". The Bible Translator. 52 (3): 335–349. doi:10.1177/026009350105200305. S2CID 171770385.
- ——— (2003). "Greek Grammar and the Personality of the Holy Spirit". Bulletin for Biblical Research. 13 (1): 97–125. doi:10.2307/26422781. JSTOR 26422781. S2CID 248445869.
- ——— (2006). "The Gospel according to Bart: A Review Article of Misquoting Jesus by Bart Ehrman". Journal of the Evangelical Theological Society. 49: 327–49.
