= Dirk Obbink =

American papyrologist and classicist (born 1957)

Dirk D. Obbink (born 13 January 1957 in Lincoln, Nebraska) is an American papyrologist and classicist. He was Lecturer in Papyrology and Greek Literature in the Faculty of Classics at Oxford University until 6 February 2021, and was the head of the Oxyrhynchus Papyri Project until August 2016. Obbink was also a fellow and tutor in Greek at Christ Church Oxford, from which role he was suspended in October 2019, as a result of allegations that he had stolen some of the Oxyrhynchus papyri and sold them to the Museum of the Bible.

== Early life and education ==
Obbink's father Jack was director of the Federal Housing Administration office in Omaha; his mother worked for the state government. He attended Lincoln Southeast high school in Lincoln, Nebraska, and took a BA in English at the University of Nebraska–Lincoln in 1979, before earning an MA in Classical Studies and Papyrology there in 1984. In 1987, he received his PhD in Classics at Stanford University with his 1986 dissertation entitled Philodemus, De Pietate I.

== Career ==
After an assistant professorship at Columbia University in New York in 1995, Obbink was appointed to the post of Lecturer in Papyrology and Greek Literature in the Faculty of Classics at Christ Church, Oxford University and was appointed the head of the Oxyrhynchus Papyri Project. The Oxyrhynchus Papyri are a large collection of ancient manuscript fragments discovered by archaeologists at an ancient rubbish dump near Oxyrhynchus in Egypt. They include thousands of Greek and Latin documents, letters and literary works. In addition, from 2003 to 2007, Obbink was a faculty member at the University of Michigan, as a professor of classical studies and the Ludwig Koenen Collegiate Professor of Papyrology.

From 1998 to circa 2015, Obbink was the Director of the Imaging Papyri Project at Oxford. This project is working to capture digitised images of Greek and Latin papyri held by the Ashmolean Museum (the Oxyrhynchus Papyri), and the Bodleian Library and the Biblioteca Nazionale in Naples (the carbonized scrolls from the Villa of the Papyri at Herculaneum), for the creation of an Oxford bank of digitised images of papyri. The newly digitised versions of the literary texts will be published. An international team of papyrologists combine traditional philological methods with more recent digital imaging techniques. They have made accessible heavily damaged texts from the ancient world, many of which had been regarded as being irretrievably lost. In this way the damaged texts of the Oxyrhynchus Papyri and the Villa of the Papyri can now be read for the first time.

Obbink has made significant contributions in the fields of ancient literature, society and philosophy. He is familiar with the poetry of Sappho or Simonides discovered in the Egyptian Oxyrhynchus papyri, as he is with the technical-philosophical writings of the Epicurean Philodemus, the text of which he helped recover from the carbonized papyrus rolls discovered in The Villa of the Papyri at Herculaneum.

In 2001, Obbink was awarded a MacArthur Fellowship for his work on the papyri from Oxyrhynchus and Herculaneum. In May 2007, the Katholieke Universiteit Leuven awarded him an honorary doctorate.

In March 2010, Obbink appeared in Channel 4's series Alexandria: The Greatest City, presented by Bettany Hughes. In the programme he talked about the ancient Library of Alexandria. He also featured briefly in the 2015 BBC documentary Love and Life on Lesbos with Margaret Mountford, in which he showed Mountford a papyrus brought to him by an anonymous private collector in 2012 and that is now believed to be a manuscript copy, executed in about A.D. 200, of a poem written by Sappho in c. 600 B.C.

== Alleged sale of stolen papyri ==
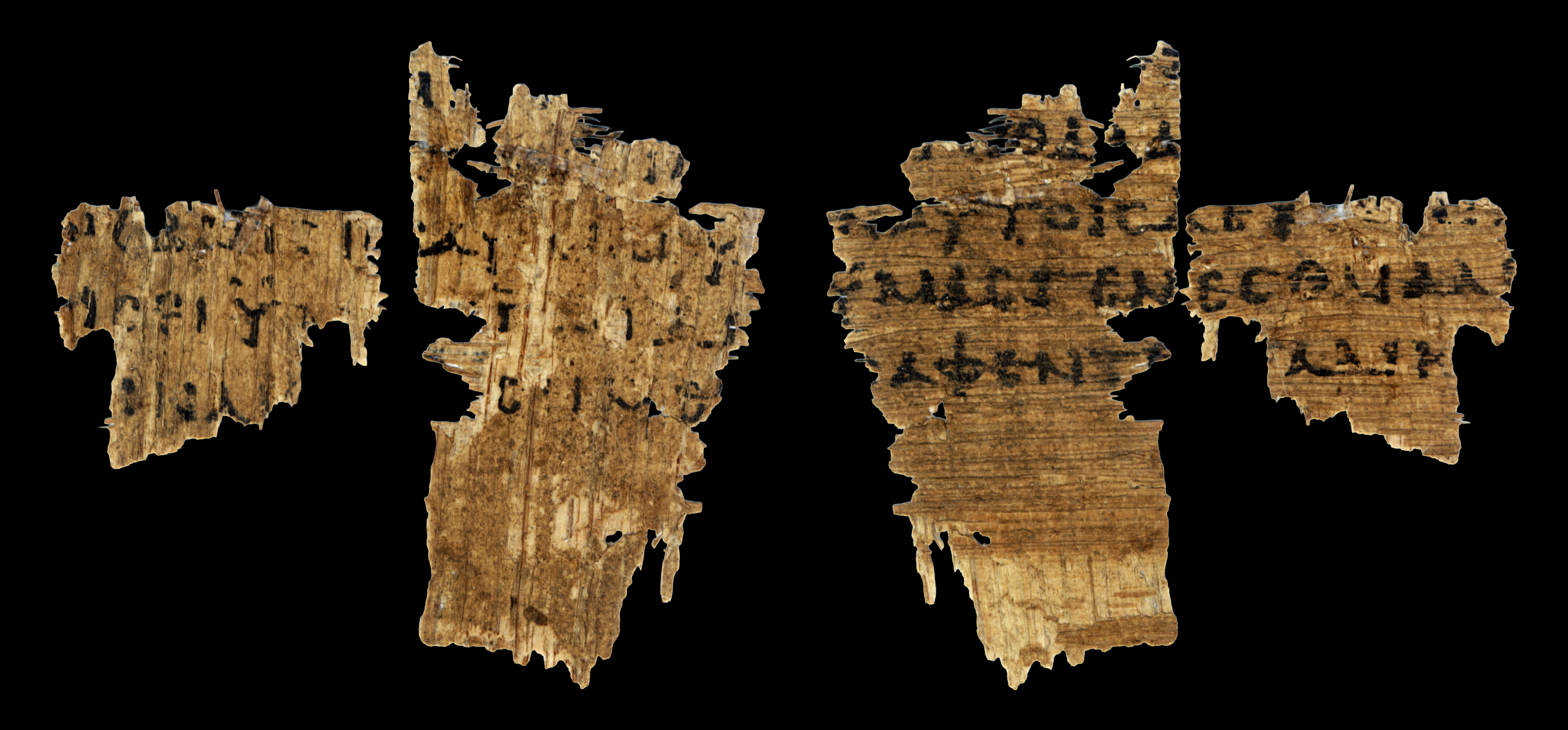
P.Oxy. 5345 with parts of Mark I 7–9, 16–18

In August 2016 the Egypt Exploration Society (EES) decided not to reappoint Obbink as general editor of the Oxyrhynchus Papyri series, stating this was “because of unsatisfactory discharge of his editorial duties, but also because of concerns, which he did not allay, about his alleged involvement in the marketing of ancient texts.” In May 2018 Obbink and Daniela Colomo published the papyrus fragment P.Oxy. 5345 in volume LXXXIII of the Oxyrhynchus Papyri series of the Egypt Exploration Society. This fragment contained portions of six verses from the first chapter of the Gospel of Mark, and was designated 𝔓^{137} in the standard classification of New Testament papyri. Obbink and Colomo dated it to the later second or earlier third century, but rumours of its content, provenance and date had been widely discussed since 2012, fuelled by an ill-advised claim by Daniel B. Wallace in 2012 that a fragmentary papyrus of Mark had been authoritatively dated to the late first century by one of the world's leading paleographers, and might consequently be the earliest surviving Christian text.

Following publication in 2018, the EES, the owners of the papyrus fragment, released a statement clarifying both the provenance of the fragment and Obbink's role in the circumstances of misleading information subsequently emerging on social media. The EES stated that the text in the fragment had only been recognised as being from the Gospel of Mark in 2011. In an earlier cataloguing in the 1980s by Revel Coles, the fragment had been described as 'I/II', which appeared to be the origin of the much discussed assertions of a very early date. In 2011/2012 the papyrus was in the keeping of Obbink, who had shown it to Scott Carroll, then representing the Green Collection, in connection with a proposal that it might be included in the exhibition of biblical papyri Verbum Domini at the Vatican during Lent and Easter 2012. It was not until the spring of 2016 that the EES realised that the rumoured "First Century Mark" papyrus that had become the subject of so much speculation was one and the same as their own fragment P.Oxy. 5345, whereupon Obbink and Colomo were requested to prepare it for publication.

In June 2019, the EES released a further statement following the publication by Michael Holmes of the Museum of the Bible of a contract between Obbink and Hobby Lobby dated 17 January 2013 for the sale of a number of fragmentary texts, one of which Holmes identified as P.Oxy. LXXXIII 5345. The Egypt Exploration Society reaffirmed its previous statement that this fragment had never been offered for sale by the EES, while offering the clarification that, in that statement, they had "simply reported Professor Obbink's responses to our questions at that time, in which he insisted that he had not sold or offered for sale the Mark fragment to the Green Collection, and that he had not required Professor Wallace to sign a Non-Disclosure Agreement in relation to such a sale".

In the July/August 2019 issue of Christianity Today, Jerry Pattengale wrote an article in which he published for the first time his own perspectives on the 'First Century Mark' saga. Pattengale stated that he had been present with Scott Carroll in Obbink's rooms in Christ Church, Oxford in late 2011, when the 𝔓^{137} fragment was shown to the Museum of the Bible, which Pattengale then represented. Also shown for sale were fragments of the Gospels of Matthew, Luke and John, all of which Obbink had then proposed as likely to be of a second century date, while the Mark fragment was presented as more likely first century. According to Pattengale, he had undertaken due diligence in showing images of the four fragments to selected New Testament textual scholars, including Daniel B. Wallace – subject to their signing non-disclosure agreements in accordance with Obbink's stipulations; and the purchase was eventually finalised, with the fragments agreed to remain in Obbink's possession for research prior to publication. It was not until a gala dinner in November 2017, celebrating the opening of the Museum of the Bible, that Pattengale realised that the First Century Mark fragment had been the property of the Egypt Exploration Society all along, and consequently had never legitimately been offered for sale. Obbink had shared personally with Pattengale and Carroll, and in his documents, that he was researching and selling these items for a wealthy family.

In October 2019, the EES announced that twelve papyrus fragments and one parchment fragment were being returned to them by the Museum of the Bible, which acknowledged that the fragments belonged to the EES. The Museum of the Bible stated that eleven of these pieces had come into their possession after having been sold to Hobby Lobby by Obbink in two batches in 2010. The other two pieces are reported to have been bought from a dealer based in Israel. The EES said that the corresponding catalogue card and photograph for most of these thirteen items were also missing from the EES collection, and that they were only able to identify the missing items because backup copies of the catalogue cards and photographs had been made. The EES is continuing to check its collection for any more items that may have been taken without permission. These thirteen items are:

- P.Oxy. inv. 39 5B.119/C(4–7)b: Genesis 5
- P.Oxy. inv. 20 3B.30/F(5–7)b: Genesis 17
- P.Oxy. inv. 102/171(e): Exodus 20–21
- P.Oxy. inv. 105/149(a): Exodus 30.18–19
- P.Oxy. inv. 93/Dec. 23/M.1: Deuteronomy
- P.Oxy. inv. 8 1B.188/D(1–3)a: Psalms 9.23–26
- P.Oxy. inv. 16 2B.48/C(a): Sayings of Jesus
- related to P.Oxy. inv. 101/72(a): Romans 3
- P.Oxy. inv. 29 4B.46/G(4–6)a: Romans 9–10
- P.Oxy. inv. 106/116(d) + 106/116(c): 1 Corinthians 7–10
- P.Oxy. inv. 105/188(c): Quotation of Hebrews
- P.Oxy. inv. 3 1B.78/B(1–3)a: Scriptural homily
- P.Oxy. inv. 8 1B.192/G(2)b: Acts of Paul (parchment)

Since June 2019, Obbink has had his access to the EES collection removed, and as of October 2019 he is under investigation by Oxford University for removing texts belonging to the EES from university premises.

In a statement to the Waco Tribune-Herald, Obbink denied all accusations of wrongdoing and claimed that documents linking him to the sale of the papyrus fragments were forgeries deliberately intended to damage his reputation and career. In October 2019, Obbink was suspended from his role at Christ Church, Oxford.

In November 2019, the chairman of the EES stated that 120 pieces had been discovered to be missing from their collection of Oxyrhynchus papyri, including the thirteen items from the Museum of the Bible and another six items now in the collection of Andrew Stimer in California. The Museum of the Bible has returned these pieces to the EES. Stimer has also agreed to return his items to the EES. The alleged thefts of these items were reported to the Thames Valley Police on 12 November 2019. Obbink's arrest by officers from Thames Valley police was reported on 16 April 2020 in the student newspaper The Oxford Blue.

In June 2021 the Museum of the Bible stated it was suing Obbink for £5 million. Hobby Lobby, the company behind the Museum, alleges that Obbink sold fragments of papyrus and ancient objects stolen from an Oxford University collection in seven private sales between 2010 and 2013, worth a total of $7,095,100. In December 2021, Christianity Today reported that a default judgement had been issued against Obbink. The case was transferred to the Western District of Oklahoma, where Hobby Lobby is headquartered, in 2023. On March 11, 2024, a further default judgment was issued against Obbink, who neither appeared in court nor named an attorney throughout the entire case. Hobby Lobby was awarded its $7,000,000 investment, interest, and other fees. As of the date of the judgment, Obbink has refunded only $10,000 to Hobby Lobby.

== Activities after arrest ==
In 2021, Obbink reported that he was working on a publication which would demonstrate the provenance of the highly contested manuscript P. Sapph. Obbink. He has not been heard from since, but a BBC radio programme first broadcast on 12 March 2025 tracked Obbink down to a house 'on the outskirts of Oxford', where he refused to speak to the presenter of the programme.

== Select publications ==
- Alan K. Bowman (Author, Editor), R.A. Coles (Editor), N. Gonis (Editor), Dirk Obbink (Editor), Peter John Parsons (Editor), Oxyrhynchus: A City and Its Texts Egypt Exploration Society (2007) ISBN 0-85698-177-X
- Christopher A. Faraone (Editor), Dirk Obbink (Editor) Magika Hiera: Ancient Greek Magic and Religion OUP USA (1997) ISBN 0-19-511140-0
- Marcello Gigante (Author)and Dirk Obbink (Translator) Philodemus in Italy: The Books from Herculaneum (The Body in Theory: Histories of Cultural Materialism) The University of Michigan Press (2002) ISBN 0-472-08908-0
- Dirk Obbink (Editor), Philodemus and Poetry: Poetic Theory and Practice in Lucretius, Philodemus, and Horace Oxford University Press USA (1995) ISBN 0-19-508815-8
- T. V. Evans (Editor), D. D. Obbink (Editor) The Language of the Papyri Oxford University Press (2009) ISBN 0-19-923708-5
- A.E. Raubitschek (Author), Dirk Obbink (Editor), Paul A.Vander Waerdt (Editor), The School of Hellas: Essays on Greek History, Archaeology and Literature Oxford University Press Inc (1991) ISBN 0-19-505691-4
- Dirk Obbink, Philodemus On Piety: Part 1, Critical Text with Commentary: Critical Text with Commentary Pt.1 Clarendon Press (1996) ISBN 0-19-815008-3
- Jean-Jacques Aubert (Contributor), Roger S. Bagnall (Editor), Dirk D. Obbink (Editor) Columbia Papyri X (American Studies in Papyrology) American Society of Papyrologists (1996) ISBN 0-7885-0275-1
- N. Gonis (Editor), Dirk Obbink (Editor), P. J. Parsons (Editor) Oxyrhynchus Papyri 68 (4639-4704) (Graeco-Roman Memoirs) Egypt Exploration Society (2003) ISBN 0-85698-142-7
- N. Gonis (Editor), Dirk Obbink (Editor), D. Colomo (Editor) Oxyrhynchus Papyri: v. 69 (Graeco-Roman Memoirs) Egypt Exploration Society (2005) ISBN 0-85698-143-5
- N. Gonis (Author), Dirk Obbink (Author) Oxyrhynchus Papyri: Pt. 73 (Graeco-Roman Memoirs) Egypt Exploration Society (2009) ISBN 0-85698-182-6
- John T. Fitzgerald (Author, Editor), Dirk Obbink (Author, Editor), Glenn Stanfield Holland (Author, Editor), et al. Philodemus and the New Testament World (Novum Testamentum Supplements) Brill (2003) ISBN 90-04-11460-2
- Anubio, Carmen Astrologicum Elegiacum, ed. Dirk Obbink, Bibliotheca Teubneriana; K. G. Saur, Munich and Leipzig (2006) ISBN 3-598-71228-6
- David Sider and Dirk Obbink (eds.), Doctrine and Doxography: Studies on Heraclitus and Pythagoras, de Gruyter, Berlin 2013.
