= Secretum Philosophorum =

The Secretum Philosophorum was a popular Latin text originating in England c.1300–1350. Ostensibly a treatise on the Seven Liberal Arts, it merely uses them as a framework in which to describe and demystify practical tricks, ‘tricks of the trade’ and applied science.

== Sections ==
Prologue (Iste liber quem per manibus habemus vocatur Secretum Philosophorum.)

Book I is nominally on ‘Grammar’ which ‘teaches us to write correctly’ (Grammatica docet recte scribere et recte loqui). Explaining that no-one can write correctly without the proper instruments, the subsequent text consists of technical recipes for the materials required ‘for correct writing’, plus some recipes for concealing meanings by the use of invisible ink and ciphers. Book I is thus in fact an artists' recipe book. Book I thus includes recipes for pigments, tempering, adhesives, varnish, writing tablets, artificial pumice and invisible ink, and for writing on metal by etching; many of these technical recipes are unique, rare, variant or unusually early witnesses to practices, or clarify obscure recipes in other treatises; the instructions appear to be for amateur use. Book I then ends with homilies on ‘correct speaking’ (discretion and the dangers of lying), taken from the pseudo-Aristotle Secretum secretorum, with a note on ‘weasel words’ for concealing meaning.

Book II, ‘Rhetoric’ ‘teaches ornate speech’ (Rethorica docet ornate loqui). It collects riddles.

Book III, ‘Dialectic’ ‘teaches to discern between true and false’ (Dialetica docet discernere verum a falso et ab apparenti vero). It collects various tricks for deceiving the five senses, with mirrors and conjuring tricks.

Book IV, ‘Arithmetic’ ‘teaches numbers per se’ (Arismetrica docet de numero per se). It rejoices in the multiplication of chains of immense numbers.

Part V, ‘Music’ ‘teaches the numbers of sound’ (Musica docet de numero sonoro). It describes the monochord, and a recipe for gut strings.

Book VI, ‘Geometry’ ‘teaches magnitudes, i.e. to measure’ (Geometria docet de magnitudinibus id est de mensuris quantitatum). It gives practical tricks for measuring, especially buildings.

Book VII, ‘Astronomy’ ‘teaches movements of the heavens and their effects on men’ (Astronomia docet de magnitudine mobili hoc est de motibus firmamenti et planetarum et eorum effectibus). It is principally astrology, but includes a very early illustrated treatise on hydraulics.

== Manuscripts, editions and translations ==
Nearly 30 manuscripts of the Secretum philosophorum survive, making it something of a medieval 'bestseller', and Lynn Thorndike considered the Secretum philosophorum to have formed part of the general intellectual furniture of most even partially well-read individuals, and urged its publication. Nevertheless, as yet no complete edition or translation has been published.

Book I: An edition and translation of the recipes for scribes and illuminators, together with a technical commentary, has been published by Clarke (2009), which see for a list of surviving manuscripts.

Book II: Some of the riddles are edited (with suggested solutions) by Galloway (1995).

Book III: An edition, English translation, and commentary has been published by Goulding (2006).

Book V: The recipe for gut strings has been published by Jacques Handschin (1944-5).
