= Il Capitale Culturale: Studies on the Value of Cultural Heritage =

- Discipline: Cultural studies
- Language: English, Italian
- Edited by: Pietro Petraroia

Publication details
- Publisher: eum edizioni università di macerata (Italy)
- Frequency: Biannual
- Open access: Yes
- License: CC-by

Standard abbreviations
- ISO 4: Cap. Cult.

Indexing
- ISSN: 2039-2362

Links
- Journal homepage; About the Journal; Online archive

Il Capitale Culturale: Studies on the Value of Cultural Heritage is an electronic scientific journal, published in Open Access by eum - edizioni università di macerata., promoted by the University of Macerata (Italy), and founded by Massimo Montella in 2010.

The journal mission declares its intention to achieve the goal of implementing studies, research and planning activities for enhancing cultural heritage. It publishes two issues per year, plus special supplements dedicated to conference proceedings or to special topics. Each contribution, released under the Creative Commons BY-SA license, is identified by a DOI, Digital Object Identifier

It is based on the Open Journal Systems software, and indexed by some international bibliographic services, such as the DOAJ - Directory of open access journals, the Web of Science - Emerging Sources Citation Index, and Scopus.

The editor-in-chief, after the loss of the founder, is Pietro Petraroia
