= Green Collection =

Private collection of biblical manuscripts and artifacts

- Genre: Biblical manuscripts and related artifacts
- Locations: Oklahoma City, Oklahoma
- Inaugurated: March 31, 2011
- Major events: Passages exhibit
- Patrons: Steve Green, president of Hobby Lobby
- Website: GreenCollection.org

The Green Collection, later known as the Museum Collection, is one of the world's largest private collection of rare biblical texts and artifacts, made up of more than 40,000 biblical antiquities assembled by the Green family, founders of the American retail chain Hobby Lobby.

The collection is displayed in the $400-million Museum of the Bible which opened in 2017 in Washington, DC.

== Background ==
The collection is named for the Green family, founders and leaders of Hobby Lobby, the world's largest privately owned arts and crafts retailer. The collection was assembled beginning in November 2009 by its original director, ancient/medieval manuscript specialist Scott Carroll, in cooperation with Steve Green, president of Hobby Lobby and the collection's benefactor. The Green Collection is legally owned by Hobby Lobby.

After 2016, the Green Collection became known as the Museum Collection.

== Highlights ==
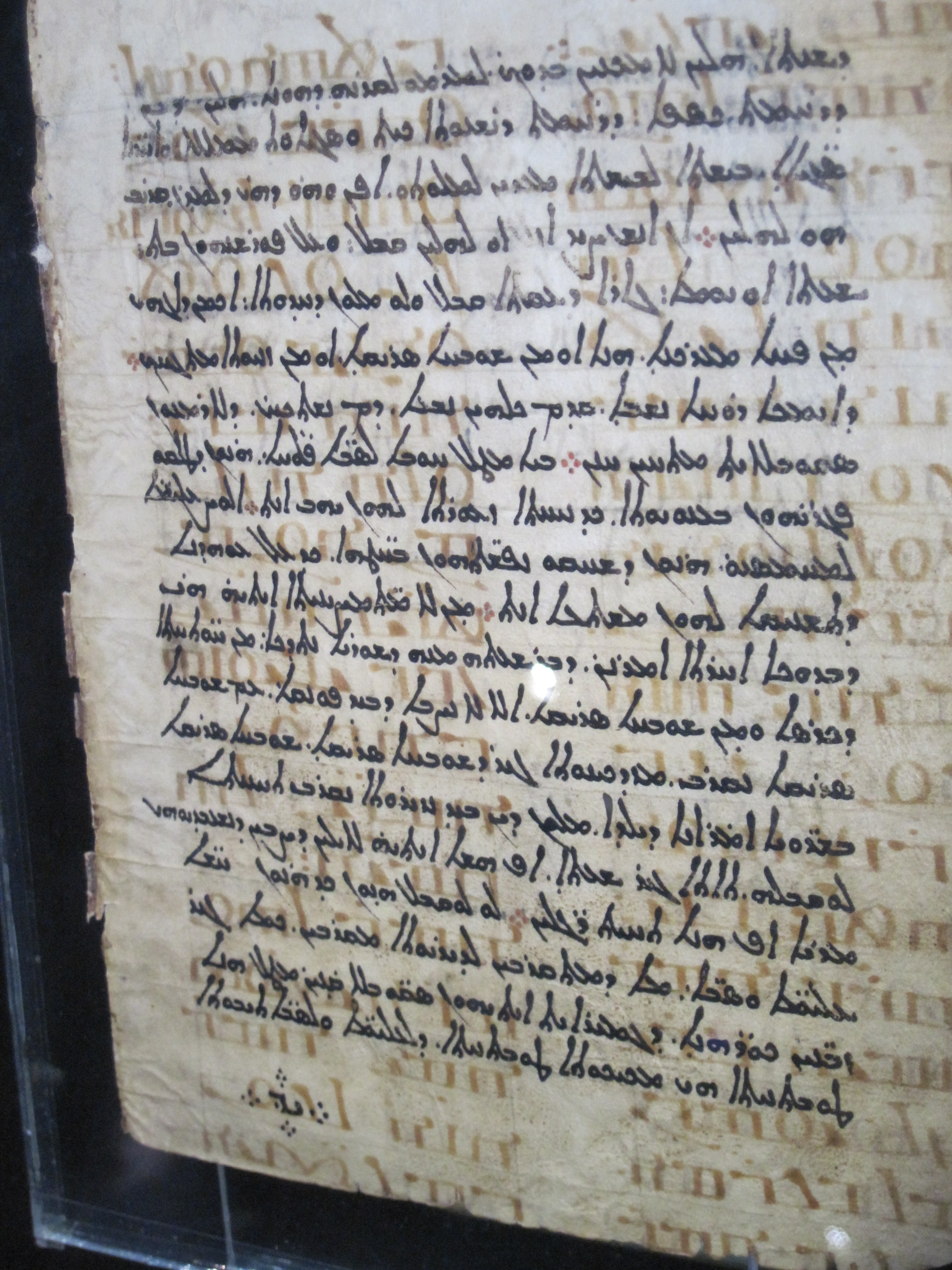
Codex Climaci Rescriptus

The capstone of the Green Collection is the Codex Climaci Rescriptus, known as Uncial 0250 (in the Gregory-Åland numbering); which is a palimpsest whose underwriting includes pages from a Greek uncial manuscript of the New Testament, as well as pages from a Christian Palestinian Aramaic uncial manuscript of the Old and New Testament. Paleographically the Greek section has been assigned to the eighth century (or seventh century), and the Christian Palestinian Aramaic section to the sixth century.

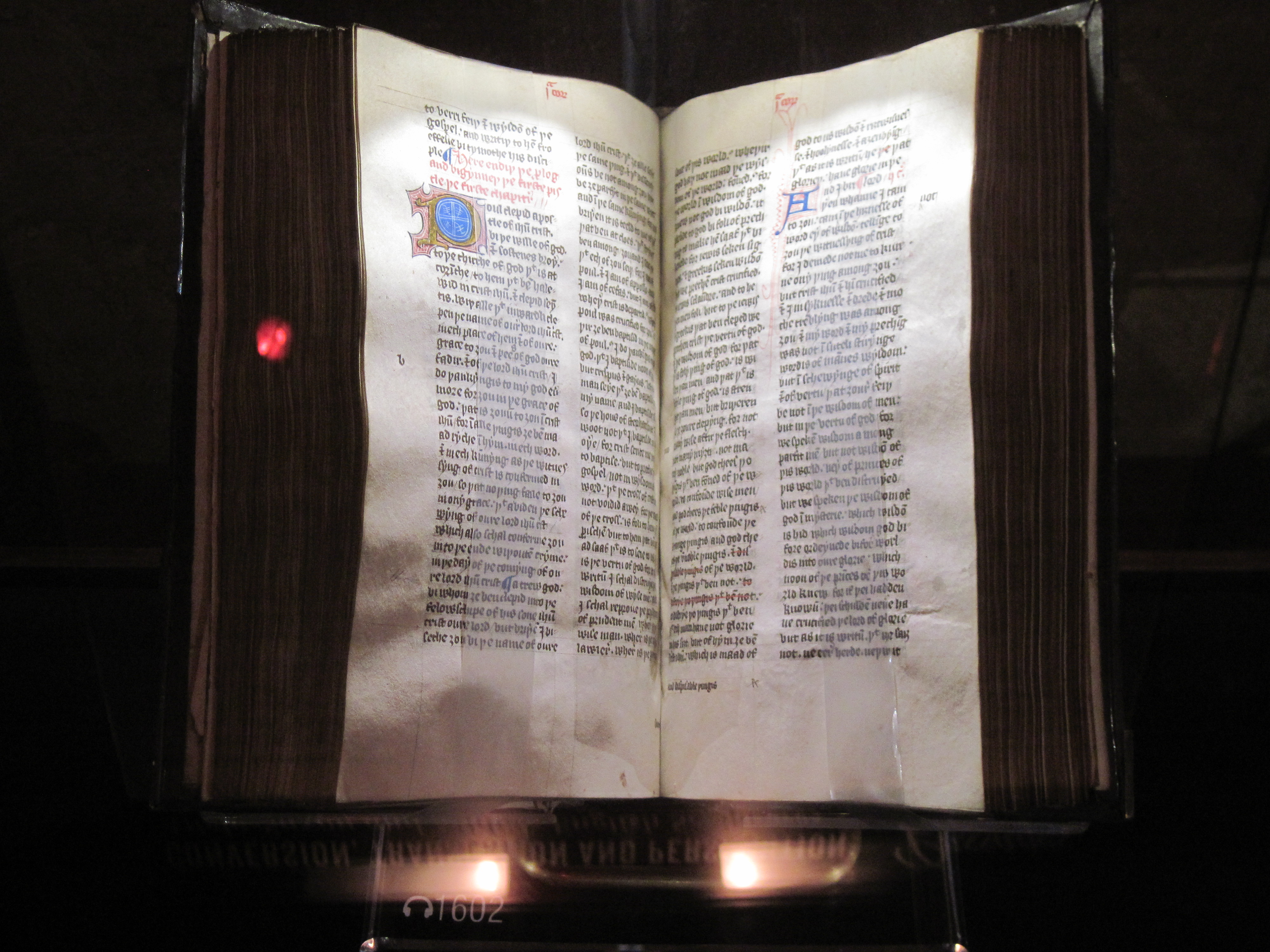
A John Wycliffe Bible in the Green Collection

Other items in the Green Collection include:

- The world's largest private collection of Jewish scrolls, including Torahs that survived the Spanish Inquisition, scrolls confiscated by the Nazis and recovered in concentration camps and others from across the globe
- One of the world's largest holdings of unpublished biblical and classical papyri, including texts that date back to the lost Library of Alexandria
- Rare illuminated manuscripts and previously unknown biblical texts and commentaries
- The earliest-known, near-complete translation of the Psalms in Middle English, including the Canticles and commentary predating Wycliffe's translation
- An undocumented copy of Wycliffe's New Testament in Middle English
- Some of the earliest printed texts, including a large portion of the Gutenberg Bible and the world's only complete Block Bible in private hands
- Early tracts and Bibles belonging to Martin Luther, including a little-known letter written the night before his excommunication
- An undocumented fragment of the Tyndale New Testament, published while he awaited execution
- Numerous items illustrating the contribution of Jews and Catholics to the King James translation of the Bible and other historical artifacts

== Contested provenance and forgeries ==
In 2015 questions were raised about the provenance of some articles in the collection when The Daily Beast ran a story about two or three hundred cuneiform tablets purchased from an Israeli antiquities dealer and confiscated by US Customs when they were being shipped to the Green collection storage facility in Oklahoma City in 2011. As of 2015, the tablets remained impounded as a legal dispute regarding the possible illegal purchase of antiquities removed from a conflict zone (Mesopotamia) proceeds. In 2020, thousands of antiquities from the Green Collection and Museum of the Bible were returned to Egypt and Iraq.

The museum previously held 16 purported Dead Sea Scrolls, but in March 2020, all of the fragments were confirmed to be archaeological forgeries.

== Worldwide exhibitions ==
=== Book of Books ===
On October 23, 2013, a special exhibition drawn from the Green collection, Book of Books, opened at the Bible Lands Museum in Jerusalem, Israel. It will be in Jerusalem until May 24, 2014. It then will become part of the permanent exhibition in the new museum.

=== Verbum Domini and Verbum Domini II exhibits ===
Select items from Passages, the Green Collection, and items on loan from other private collections around the world were displayed in St. Peter's Square, Vatican City, for Lent and Easter 2012, highlighting the Jewish and Christian contributions to the formation and preservation of the Bible. The exhibition was repeated in 2014. American Bible Society and the Vatican Library supported this endeavor.

=== "Passages" ===
Passages, a traveling exhibition featuring select items from the Green Collection that tell the story of the English Bible, was announced to a gathering of business, government, academic and religious leaders at the Vatican Embassy in Washington, DC, on March 31, 2011. Passages made its worldwide debut at the Oklahoma City Museum of Art in Oklahoma City—home to Hobby Lobby's headquarters—in May 2011. The exhibit was eventually seen by more than 63,000 people in Oklahoma's capital city.

Visitors to Passages interact with more than 400 rare biblical texts, artifacts and discoveries through multimedia and historical settings in an 30,000-square-foot (2,800 m^{2}) exhibit designed to tell the story of how today's Bible came to be.

=== Other exhibits ===
Portions of Passages and the Green Collection have also been on display on various college and university campuses throughout its worldwide tour, including Baylor University for its conference on "The King James Bible and the World It Made, 1611–2011" in April 2011, Liberty University in September 2011, Gordon-Conwell Theological Seminary in February 2012, and Indiana Wesleyan University in April 2013. Items from the Green Collection appeared at a series of conferences in West Africa in September 2011, and have also been displayed at the Ark Encounter and Creation Museum.

In honor of the Pope's September 2015 visit to Philadelphia, the Museum of the Bible sponsored a special exhibition of Verbum Domini II at the Philadelphia Convention Center adjacent to the World Meeting.

== Green Scholars Initiative ==
Formed in the summer of 2010, the Green Scholars Initiative, later known as the Scholars Initiative, provides university mentors and student scholars at participating institutions with research opportunities on items from the Green Collection. Participants in the Scholars Initiative must sign non-disclosure agreements, an unusual requirement for humanities scholarship. The scholarly analyses by the Scholars Initiative participants help the Green Collection identify and value its items.

Academics and textual experts participating in the Scholars Initiative have included:

- Mariam Ayad, University of Memphis: Lead Mentor-Scholar, Papyri Project and Egyptian and Coptic texts
- Gordon Campbell, University of Leicester: Co-Senior Scholar, King James Version Project
- Robert Duke, Azusa Pacific University: Scholar of Hebrew texts
- Jeffrey Fish, Baylor University: Scholar of Greek texts
- Ralph Hanna, University of Oxford: Senior Scholar, Richard Rolle Project
- David Lyle Jeffrey, Baylor University: Senior Scholar, Christian tradition and spirituality
- Alister McGrath, University of Cambridge: Senior Scholar, KJV Critical Text Project
- Curt Niccum, Abilene Christian University: Distinguished Scholar of Ethiopic texts
- Dirk Obbink, University of Oxford: Senior Scholar, Papyri
- Thomas Oden, Drew University: Senior Scholar, African texts
- David Riggs, Indiana Wesleyan University: Distinguished Scholar of Latin texts
- Marcel Sigrist, École Biblique: Senior Scholar, Cuneiform
- Daniel B. Wallace, Center for the Study of New Testament Manuscripts, and Dallas Theological Seminary: Mentor-Scholar
- Peter Williams, University of Cambridge: Scholar of Aramaic texts
- Benno van den Toren, University of Oxford: Distinguished Scholar of Dutch texts

== Museum of the Bible ==
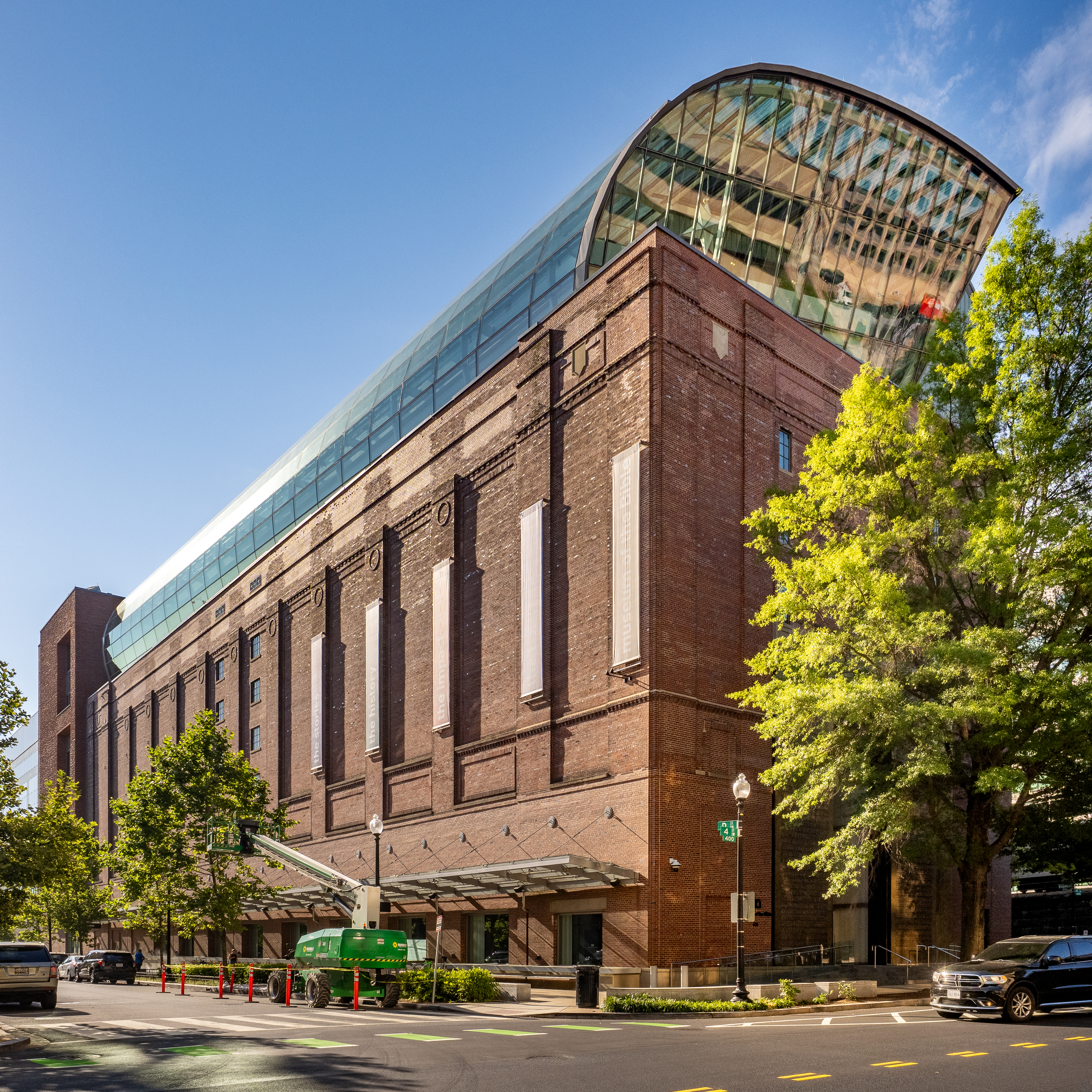
The Museum of the Bible in Washington, D.C., photographed in 2024

In 2012, Steve Green announced his family's intention to open a permanent institution, which he claimed would be a scholarly museum, not an evangelistic outreach ministry, within the next four years to house the Green Collection. The mission statement of the museum, however, as found in its 501(c)3 tax filings for 2011, the most recent year available, is "To bring to life the living Word of God, to tell its compelling story of preservation, and to inspire confidence in the absolute authority and reliability of the Bible." More recently, Green told a press conference that the Museum will focus on the Bible's impact, history and narrative, explaining that while he might hope that the museum would bring people to Christianity, the museum is not created as a tool of evangelizing, “We’re not discussing a lot of particulars of the book. It’s more of a high-level discussion of here’s this book, what is its history and impact and what is its story."

The Greens identified Washington, DC, Dallas, and New York City as finalists for the museum's location.

In July 2012, the Green Collection announced the purchase of the building housing the Washington Design Center in DC, for a reported $50 million, to house the as-yet-unnamed national Bible museum. The building is located two blocks from the National Mall at 300 D. Street SW, near the Federal Center SW Metro station. The museum will reportedly charge admission, as do other private museums in Washington, such as the National Building Museum, the International Spy Museum, and the Newseum. The museum was constructed in the former Design Center, an historically protected Renaissance Revival building close to the National Mall and the United States Capitol.

Donations from the Green Collection are made to the Museum of the Bible, providing a tax write-off to Hobby Lobby.
