= Peter Shockey =

American filmmaker and screenwriter (born 1955)

Peter Shockey (born 1955) is an American filmmaker and screenwriter.

He has received a New York City Film Festival award for his television film Life After Life (1992). In addition, both he and his works have appeared on talk shows and television shows such as Oprah and the 700 Club.

Peter co-wrote the book Journey of Light with Stowe D. Shockey and its focus is to implement her experience as an abused child in order to help others. Peter and Stowe both live in Nashville, Tennessee.

Currently, he is working as a professor of Media Production & Writing classes at Webster University in Tashkent.

== Books ==
- Journey of Light: Stories of Dawn after Darkness (co-wrote with Stowe D. Shockey, Doubleday, 2007. ISBN 978-0-385-50126-2
