= Ralph Hanna =

American writer and medievalist

Ralph Hanna is Professor Emeritus of Paleography at Keble College, Oxford and Professor Emeritus of English at University of California, Riverside. After undergraduate study at Amherst College, he earned his M.A. and Ph.D. at Yale University. He is the author of Pursuing History: Middle English Manuscripts and Their Texts (1996), London Literature, 1300-1380 (2005), The English Manuscripts of Richard Rolle: A Descriptive Catalogue (2010), Introducing English Medieval Book History: Manuscripts, Their Producers and Their Readers (2014), and Editing Medieval Texts: An Introduction (2015). He has also edited a number of important Middle English texts, including volumes such as Richard Rolle: Uncollected Prose and Verse, With Related Northern Texts (2007), the Speculum Vitae, with David Lawton The Siege of Jerusalem (2003), and, with Sarah Wood, Richard Morris's Prick of Conscience: A Corrected and Amplified Reading Text (2013), all with the Early English Text Society.
