= John B. Friedman =

American medievalist

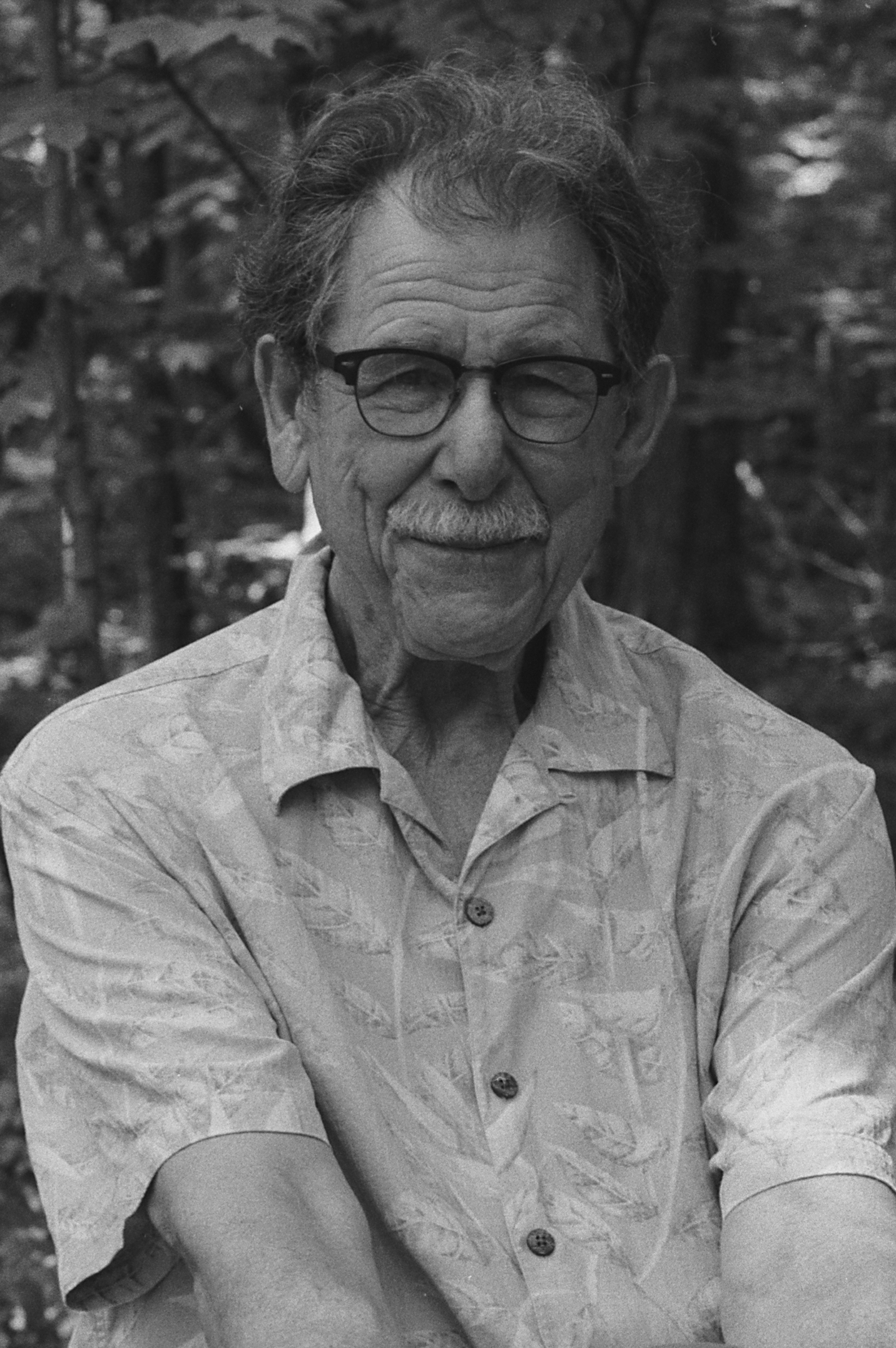

John Block Friedman (born December 8, 1934, in Troy, New York) is an American medievalist and Emeritus Professor of English at the University of Illinois Urbana-Champaign. His research has spanned classical mythology, medieval literature, manuscript studies, and medieval material culture. He is noted for his work on the legend of Orpheus in the Middle Ages and for his monograph The Monstrous Races in Medieval Art and Thought. In later work, Friedman has explored the use of digital tools in palaeography and has contributed to the study of medieval and early modern fashion and iconography. He resides in Columbus, Ohio, and is married to the medievalist Kristen Mossler Figg.

== Education ==
Friedman received a B.A. from Reed College in 1960, an M.A. from the Johns Hopkins University in 1962, and a Ph.D. from Michigan State University in 1965.

== Areas of specialization ==
Friedman’s areas of research include Middle English literature, iconography, manuscript studies, medieval fashion history, travel and geography in medieval texts, and material culture.

== Career and Scholarship ==
Friedman’s early scholarship focused on the adaptation of classical myths by Christian authors in Late Antiquity and the Middle Ages. His study of the Orpheus myth examined its transformation into a Christian allegory, particularly in narratives depicting a descent into the underworld to rescue souls. He later pursued research into medieval encyclopedias and the representation of so-called "monstrous races"—figures described in medieval texts as inhabiting the edges of the known world. The Monstrous Races in Medieval Art and Thought(1981) addresses theological and anthropological questions raised by these beings, such as whether they possessed souls or reflected divine intent.

In the 1990s, Friedman applied early digital methodologies to the analysis of Gothic handwriting, using pixel-count analysis to explore scribal attribution. His work contributed to the identification of the scribe William de Stiphel and was part of early research in the application of pattern recognition to manuscript studies. He has also explored the literary transformation of classical and folkloric figures in his article “Eurydice, Heurodis, and the Noon-Day Demon,” which examines narrative, myth, and characterization.

Friedman has also collaborated on edited volumes and encyclopedic reference works. With Kristen Figg and Kathrin Giogoli, he co-edited an edition and translation of the Secrets de l’Histoire Naturelle, a Middle French geographical compendium with 56 illustrations depicting real and imagined lands. Their edition was based on BnF MS fr. 22971 and was accompanied by commentary and translations. This work was later used as a central resource in a 2024 exhibition at the Getty Museum in Malibu, California.

More recently, Friedman’s scholarship has addressed representations of fashion and class in medieval art and literature. His research includes analysis of clothing and appearance in the pastourelle genre, as well as broader studies of social status as conveyed through visual details such as hair styling, garment trimming, and ornamentation. His work in this area has extended to figures in the art of Hieronymus Bosch and Albrecht Dürer, and to the examination of grooming practices in late medieval Europe.

The Monstrous Races in Medieval Art and Thought received a favorable review in The New York Times upon publication and has remained in print in multiple editions.

== Academic appointments ==
Friedman began his academic career as an Assistant Professor of English at Connecticut College from 1965 to 1968. He then served as an Associate Professor of English at Sir George Williams University in Montreal between 1968 and 1971. From 1971 to 1996, he was a Professor of English at the University of Illinois Urbana-Champaign. During the 1986–1987 academic year, he held the position of Herbert F. Johnson Distinguished Professor at the Institute for Research in the Humanities at the University of Wisconsin–Madison. He was affiliated with the Beckman Institute for Advanced Science and Technology at the University of Illinois from 1992 to 1996. In 1996, he was named Professor Emeritus of English and Medieval Studies at the University of Illinois. He later served as a Visiting Professor of English at Kent State University’s Salem campus from 1997 to 2010. Since 2014, he has been a Fellow at the Center for Medieval and Renaissance Studies at The Ohio State University.

== Fellowships and recognitions ==
Friedman was awarded a Woodrow Wilson Fellowship in 1961–1962 and received a Guggenheim Fellowship for the 1979–1980 academic year. He also held a Grant-in-Aid from the American Council of Learned Societies in 1983–1984 and was the recipient of an Arnold O. Beckman Research Award in 1989. He was affiliated with the Center for Complex Systems Research at the Beckman Institute from 1989 to 1990. His other academic honors include a Visiting Scholar appointment at the Wren Library, Trinity College, Cambridge in 1978–1979; an appointment as Associate of the Center for Advanced Study at the University of Illinois in 1975–1976; and a fellowship at the Southeastern Institute of Medieval and Renaissance Studies in the summer of 1975.

== Articles about his work on computer-assisted analysis and classification of medieval scripts. ==
1. "Computer Notes," The Chronicle of Higher Education (1 April 1991)
2. "The Who's Who of Medieval Characters."
3. "Medieval Penmanship to be Computerized," Insight Magazine, (April 1991)
4. "Illuminating Manuscripts," The Economist (London), (25 May 1991), p. 128
5. "Scribes' Sign," Massachusetts Institute of Technology, Technology Review (July 1991), p. 72

== Publications ==
=== Books ===
1. Book of the Wonders of the World. Studies, Transcription and Translation [BnF] MS fr. 22971.
2. Associate Editor, Encyclopedia of Medieval Chronicles.
3. Brueghel’s Heavy Dancers: Transgressive Clothing, Class & Culture in the Late Middle Ages.
4. Encyclopedia of Medieval Pilgrimage.
5. Arts & Humanities Through the Eras: Medieval Europe 814-1450.
6. Trade, Travel, and Exploration in the Middle Ages: An Encyclopedia.
7. The Princess with the Golden Hair: Letters of Elizabeth Waugh to Edmund Wilson 1933—1942.
8. Orphée au Moyen Age, traduit par Jean-Michel Roessli.
9. (With Jessica Wegmann), Medieval Iconography: A Research Guide.
10. Northern English Books, Owners, and Makers in the Late Middle Ages.
11. John de Foxton's Liber Cosmographiae (1408): An Edition and Codicological Study.
12. The Monstrous Races in Medieval Art and Thought. Now in 3rd paperback edition.
13. Orpheus in the Middle Ages.

=== Recent articles and book chapters ===
1. “Werewolf Transformation in the Manuscript Era.”
2. “Dürer’s Rhinoceros and what he or she was wearing: Carnations, Luxury Gardens, Identity Formation, and Urban Splendor, 1460-1550."
3. “Coats, Collars, and Capes: Royal Fashions for Animals in the Early Modern Period.”
4. “Eyebrows, Hairlines, and ‘Hairs Less in Sight’: Female Depilation in Late Medieval Europe.”
5. “Tracking the Mysterious Loz in the Secrets of Natural History.”
6. . —, and Melanie Bond, “Fashion and Material Culture in the Tabletop of the Seven Deadly Sins Attributed to Hieronymus Bosch.”
7. “Bonnacon Defence in Medieval Natural History.”
8. “Combs, Mirrors, and other Female Beauty Bling in the Later Middle Ages.”
9. “Word into Image: Apocryphal Infancy Gospel Motifs on Antoni Gaudí’s Sagrada Familía Nativity Façade.”
10. “Reading Monstrous Peoples in Greece and Rome.”
11. “Revisiting the Animal Wonders of London, British Library MS Cotton Vitellius A. XV.”
