= Grace Theological Journal =

- Language: English
- Edited by: John C. Whitcomb, followed by John J. Davis

Publication details
- History: 1980-1991
- Publisher: Grace Theological Seminary (United States)
- Frequency: Biannually

Standard abbreviations
- ISO 4: Grace Theol. J.

Indexing
- ISSN: 0198-666X
- OCLC no.: 6203551

Grace Theological Journal (GTJ) was a peer-reviewed academic journal published by Grace Theological Seminary. It contained articles of theological interest, the majority of which were written by the faculty of the seminary. It was abstracted and indexed in the ATLA Religion Database.

The founding editor-in-chief was John C. Whitcomb; towards the end of its run the journal was edited by John J. Davis.
