= List of Indiana Wesleyan University alumni =

The following is a list of Indiana Wesleyan University alumni.

== Academics ==
- James Huffman, historian specializing in East Asian history; professor emeritus at Wittenberg University
- Jerry Pattengale, founder of purpose-guided education, director of Green Scholars Initiative, executive director at the Museum of the Bible in Washington, D.C.
- Harold W. Stoke, academic and university president (University of New Hampshire 1944–1947, Louisiana State University (LSU) 1947–1951, Queens College 1958–1964)
- Aly Williams, academic administrator; 17th president of Midland University

== Arts, literature, and entertainment ==
- Laurell K. Hamilton, author
- Keith O'Conner Murphy, singer and songwriter
- John M. Pratt, American newspaper editor, publisher of Louisville Herald-Post, co-founder of North American Newspaper Alliance and former chairman of the Heritage Foundation

== Business, entrepreneurship, and philanthropy ==
- Kari Underly, American meat cutter, author, and CEO of Range, Inc.; James Beard Award finalist for The Art of Beef Cutting (2011)

== Government, law, public policy, and military ==
- Joseph Kofi Adda, member of Parliament in Ghana
- Jerry Bonnet, former interim Secretary of State of Indiana
- Jean Breaux, Indiana state senator
- Jeff Cardwell, former chair of the Indiana Republican Party
- André Carson, U.S. representative
- Marc Griffin, lawyer, world's youngest judge
- Tim Harris, former member of the Indiana House of Representatives
- Ghassan Hitto, former opposition prime minister of Syria
- Julie McIntosh, physician and politician; member of the Oklahoma State Senate
- Yemi Mobolade, mayor of Colorado Springs, Colorado
- Renee Pack, member of the Indiana House of Representatives
- Scott Schneider, former member of the Indiana State Senate (2009–2016)
- Becky Skillman, 49th Lieutenant Governor of Indiana
- John Snyder, member of the Florida House of Representatives
- Randy Truitt, Indiana state representative
- Kyle Walker, member of the Indiana Senate

== Religion ==
- Leo G. Cox, minister and theologian
- John L. Drury, ordained minister in The Wesleyan Church, theologian and educator
- R. Sheldon Duecker, bishop of the United Methodist Church

== Science, technology, medicine, and engineering ==
- Marti Jett, biochemist and researcher specializing in PTSD and coagulopathy; director of the at the U.S. Army Center for Environmental Health Research
- Paul Otto Schallert, physician and botanist; educator of botany at Salem College

== Sports ==
- Brandon Beachy, professional baseball player
- Jared Embick, head coach of the University of Akron men's soccer team
- Kyle Mangas, NBA G League basketball player for Austin Spurs; two-time NABC NAIA Division II Player of the Year, Bevo Francis Award winner, and all-time leading scorer at Indiana Wesleyan University
- Nico Matern, professional soccer midfielder
- Jamar Newsome, professional football player
- Jordan Weidner - professional basketball player
