= James Huffman =

James Huffman may refer to:

- James W. Huffman (1894–1980), United States Senator from Ohio (1945–1946)
- Jim Huffman (born 1945), law professor at Lewis & Clark Law School and 2010 candidate for United States Senator from Oregon
- James Huffman (historian) (born 1941), American historian
