= Aly Williams =

American academic administrator

17th President of Midland University
- Assuming office April 10, 2025
- Succeeding: Jody Horner

Personal details
- Children: 3
- Education: Indiana Wesleyan University; Eastern Illinois University; Walden University

Aly Williams is an American academic administrator who is the incoming 17th president of Midland University, a role she will assume on April 10, 2025. She previously held positions at Indiana Wesleyan University, including vice president of academic affairs and chief academic officer, and has academic interests in health behaviors of college students and the link between faith and fitness.

== Education ==
Williams earned a B.S. in psychology from Indiana Wesleyan University in 1994. She pursued a M.S. in exercise science at Eastern Illinois University, which she completed in 1995. In 2012, she obtained a Ph.D. in community health promotion and education from Walden University.

Williams completed the Athletic Trainer (AT) certification and is a Certified Strength and Conditioning Specialist (CSCS).

== Career ==
Williams spent 20 years as a professor of exercise science and athletic training at Indiana Wesleyan University. During this period, she also worked for 10 years as an athletic trainer for Indiana Wesleyan Athletics. Her academic interests include health behaviors of college students and the link between faith and fitness. In 2020, she was appointed vice president of academic affairs for the College of Arts and Sciences and chief academic officer at Indiana Wesleyan University.

On February 27, 2025, Williams was announced as the 17th president of Midland University. She is set to assume office on April 10, 2025, succeeding Jody Horner, who had served as president since January 2015.

== Personal life ==
Williams is married and has three children.
