= Harold W. Stoke =

American college president

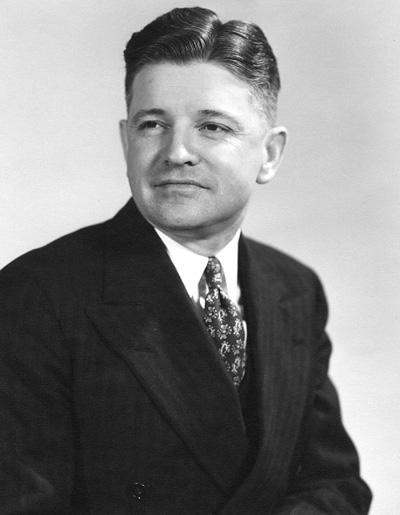

7th President of the University of New Hampshire
- In office 1944–1947
- Preceded by: Fred Engelhardt
- Succeeded by: Arthur S. Adams

President of the Louisiana State University
- In office 1947–1951

Personal details
- Born: May 11, 1903 Bosworth, Missouri, US
- Died: April 6, 1982 (aged 78) Seattle, Washington, US
- Education: Marion College; University of Southern California (M.A.); Johns Hopkins University (Ph.D)

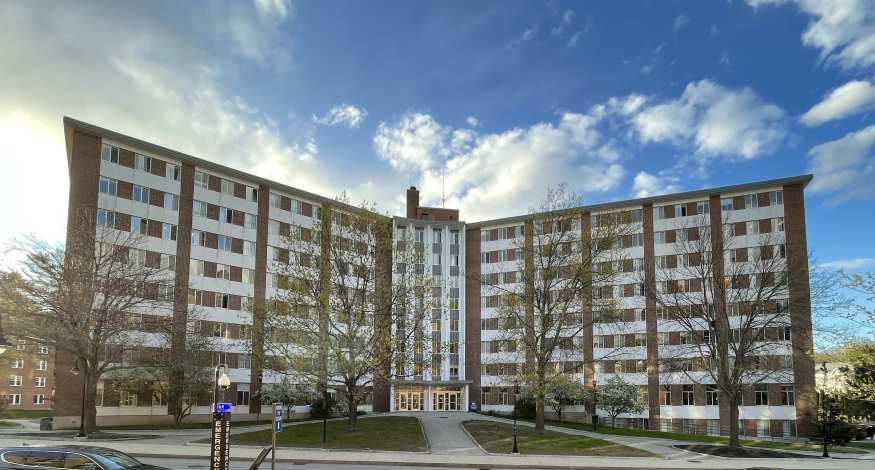
Stoke Hall at the University of New Hampshire

Harold Walter Stoke (May 11, 1903 – April 6, 1982) was an American college president. Stoke was President of University of New Hampshire, Louisiana State University, and Queens College in New York. Stoke was a trained historian and political scientist. In 1958, He wrote about the principles of college and university administration in "The American college president" published by Harper.

Stoke was educated at Marion College, (renamed Indiana Wesleyan University in 1988) (A.B. 1924), the University of Southern California (M.A. 1925), and Johns Hopkins University (Ph.D. 1930).

Stoke was a professor of political science and public administration at the University of Wisconsin, University of Nebraska and the University of Pennsylvania.

In September 1944 Stoke came to University of New Hampshire. Stoke was inaugurated the seventh President of the University in December. He served from 1944 to 1947. After three years at New Hampshire, Stoke resigned (August 1947) to become President of Louisiana State University until he stepped down in 1951.

He was President of Queens College, New York, for six years, resigning in 1964.

He died on April 6, 1982.

The University of New Hampshire built Stoke Hall, a high-rise student residence, that was dedicated on November 16–17, 1966, in his honor.
