= Arthur S. Adams =

American academic and college president

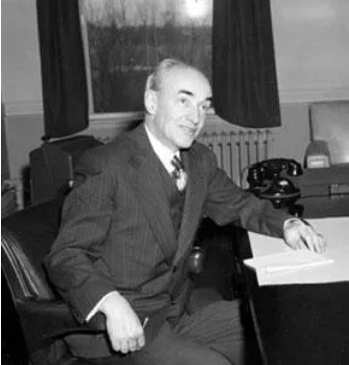

8th President of the University of New Hampshire
- In office 1948–1950
- Preceded by: Harold W. Stoke
- Succeeded by: Robert F. Chandler

Personal details
- Born: July 1, 1896 Winchester, Massachusetts, US
- Died: November 18, 1980 (aged 84) Concord, New Hampshire, US
- Education: United States Naval Academy; University of California, Berkeley; Colorado School of Mines

Arthur Stanton Adams (July 1, 1896 – November 18, 1980) was an American academic who served as the eighth president of the University of New Hampshire. He also served as Assistant Dean of Engineering and Director of the Engineering Science Management War Training Program and Provost at Cornell University. In 1948, he was appointed the eighth president of the University of New Hampshire in Durham, New Hampshire.

He was chairman of the Reserve Forces Policy Board at the United States Department of Defense from 1953 to 1955. From 1962 to 1965, he served as the second president of the Salzburg Global Seminar, a non-profit organization based in Salzburg, Austria, whose mission is to challenge current and future leaders to develop creative ideas for solving global problems. Dr. Adams co-authored The Development of Physical Thought and Fundamentals of Thermodynamics.

== Early life and education ==
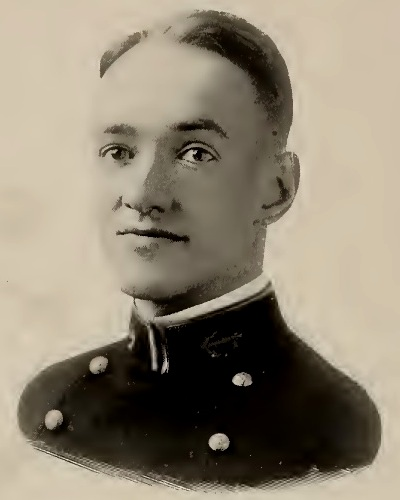
Adams' senior year portrait from the United States Naval Academy, c. 1918

Adams was born in Winchester, Massachusetts, on July 1, 1896. He attended the United States Naval Academy, where he graduated in 1918, and then served as an officer in the United States Navy. Released from active duty as a lieutenant (junior grade) in November 1921 after a service injury, he began to pursue an academic career. Adams studied physics at the University of California at Berkeley, earning a master's degree. He also obtained a doctor of science degree in metallurgy from the Colorado School of Mines.

== Career ==
After the United States entered World War II, Adams returned to active duty in the Navy as a lieutenant commander in June 1942. By April 1944, he had been promoted to captain and made director of the V-12 Navy College Training Program.

== Death ==
Adams died on November 18, 1980, at the age of 84, in Concord, New Hampshire.

Adams and his wife Dorothy Anderson Adams (July 17, 1898 – August 12, 1954) are buried at Arlington National Cemetery.

== Legacy ==
In 2010, the University of New Hampshire converted one of the towers of the closed The New England Center and Hotel into a student residence, that was renamed Adams Tower West, in his honor. After Adams Presidency he had returned to UNH as a consultant on the establishment of the New England Center for Continuing Education.

Academic offices
Preceded by H. Wallace Peters	Provost of Cornell University; 1946 – 1948	Succeeded by Cornelis W. de Kiewiet
Non-profit organization positions
Preceded by	President of the American Council on Education; 1950 –	Succeeded by
Preceded by Dexter Perkins	President of the Salzburg Global Seminar; 1962 – 1965	Succeeded by Paul M. Herzog
