= Socialist Party of North Carolina =

- Founded: 1996 (SPUSA)
- Headquarters: Carrboro, NC
- Ideology: Democratic socialism Socialist feminism
- National affiliation: Socialist Party USA
- Colors: Red

Website
- www.socialistpartync.org

The Socialist Party of North Carolina (SPNC) is a multi-tendency democratic socialist political party in the U.S. state of North Carolina. The party was launched in 1901 as the state organization of the Socialist Party of America (SPA), its direct organizational antecedent, and later reformed in 1996 as the state SPUSA affiliate after the SPA became Social Democrats, USA.

== Socialist Party of America Affiliation ==
Socialist Party of North Carolina
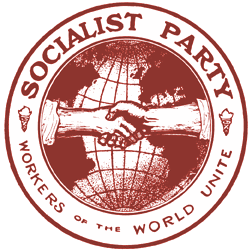
- Founded: 1901 (SPA)
- Ideology: Democratic socialism
- National affiliation: Socialist Party of America
- Colors: Red

=== Background ===
Throughout the 19th Century and well into the 20th, North Carolina was an overwhelmingly agrarian state, with 75 percent of North Carolinians living rurally as late as 1930. The farmers of the state were not atomized and apolitical, however, as the state was home to a tradition of political and economic reform dating back to the beginning of the Progressive Era in the middle 1880s. The populist Farmers' Alliance had grown deep roots in Carolina soil, exemplified by the presence some 2,200 local organizations in the state with a total membership of 90,000 by 1890.

In this period economic development in North Carolina was related in the first place to the region's massive tobacco industry, with North Carolina workers responsible for the manufacture of half the output of cigarettes and two-thirds the output of chewing tobacco. The fabric and clothing manufacturing industry also began to expand dramatically, with North Carolina mills producing half of the nation's cotton yarn by the early 20th Century.

=== Establishment ===
The Socialist Party of America was founded in 1901. The first SP nominee for President was labor leader Eugene V. Debs and he received votes in North Carolina several times. The first time was in 1904, when he received 125 votes. In 1912, the party held its convention with 100 delegates from 12 counties in Winston-Salem. A theme of the meeting was opposition to global war. In that year, Socialist nominee Debs received 1,025 votes.

In 1916, Socialist nominee Allen Benson received 509 votes for president. In 1920, Debs was once again the nominee and earned 446 votes while in federal prison. The vote totals were relatively low because small parties were required to print and pay for the ballots with the names of their party's nominees.

The party's 1920 platform included calls for the repeal of poll taxes and the guaranteeing of voting rights regardless skin color, which did not come to fruition until the Civil Rights Movement decades later.

=== The Great Depression years ===
In October 1932, Socialist presidential candidate Norman Thomas spoke before 1,200 people in Raleigh. He earned 5,591 votes in the general election.

The Socialist Party of North Carolina held a convention in Greensboro, North Carolina in 1932 during the Great Depression. It was actively involved in various labor disputes, including locally in the 1934 textile workers strike. During the 1930s, attempts were made to form a united front between members of the Communist Party and Socialist Party in North Carolina.

Following the successful efforts to put Thomas on the 1932 ballot, North Carolina drastically increased its ballot access requirements. The North Carolina Attorney General threatened to sue North Carolina voters who signed the party's petition but were not party members.

=== Rejection of the United Front ===
From the time of the 1929 Loray Mill strike in Gastonia, North Carolina had been the target of political organizers of the Communist Party USA (CPUSA) — bitter rivals and political enemies of the Socialists throughout the CP's ultra-revolutionary Third Period. With the specter of fascism growing in Europe, this ultra-left political line of the international Communist movement began to change in 1934, with a move made towards a new Popular Front policy. On September 21, 1934, Communist functionary Paul Crouch wrote directly to Socialist leader Norman Thomas proposing united action between Communists and Socialists in organizing the textile industry.

Crouch proposed joint action on a range of political issues, including support of unemployment insurance, repeal of the state's regressive sales tax, legal defense of jailed strikers and other political prisoners, and monthly meetings between Socialists and Communists in North Carolina. Thomas poured cold water on the idea of closer ties between the bitter political foes, however, declaring in a negative reply to Crouch that Communist "policy in the labor field is hurtful rather than helpful to the policy we want to achieve."

The rejection of the proposed united front in North Carolina by the SPA's national leadership had negative repercussions for the Socialist Party of North Carolina, however, inspiring two of the SP's top leaders in the state — State Secretary Alton Lawrence and State Executive Committee member Hazel Dawson — to quit the SPA and apply for membership in the CPUSA. The Socialist organizing effort was thereby attenuated somewhat and Communist momentum improved; no united front action would never develop, however.

=== Towards World War II ===
In January 1938, Socialist Party leader Norman Thomas spoke on campus at the University of North Carolina at Chapel Hill. He was introduced by historian Howard K. Beale.

== Reorganization ==
The Socialist Party of North Carolina (SPNC) was re-formed in 1996 as the modern affiliate of Socialist Party USA, a successor to the historic Socialist Party of America. The SPNC has small, organized groups in Raleigh and Jacksonville. For the first time since 1936, the 2000 presidential election saw a Socialist Party presidential candidate, David McReynolds, was an official write-in candidate in North Carolina.

In the early 2000s, the SPNC was involved in a variety of causes, including a boycott of Mt. Olive Pickles and the work of People of Faith against the Death Penalty. Again as a write-in, the Socialist Party presidential candidate in 2004, Walt Brown, received about 300 votes in North Carolina.

== Notable members ==
- Paul Otto Schallert (1879–1970), physician and botanist who visited the Soviet Union as a party representative in 1935

== See also ==
- Political party strength in North Carolina
- Politics of North Carolina
- Government of North Carolina
- Elections in North Carolina
- Law of North Carolina
- Loray Mill strike
- Junius Scales
