= Paul Otto Schallert =

American botanist (1879–1970)

- Born: 5 March 1879; Watertown, Wisconsin
- Died: 30 January 1970 (aged 90); Freehold Township, New Jersey
- Education: Marion College; University of Illinois College of Physicians & Surgeons
- Scientific career
- Fields: Medicine, botany
- Workplaces: Salem College
- Author abbrev. (botany): Schallert

Paul Otto Schallert (5 March 1879 – 30 January 1970) was an American physician and botanist active in North Carolina.

== Early life and career ==
Schallert was born in Watertown, Wisconsin on 5 March 1879. He grew up on a farm, and later worked as a carpenter to afford college tuition. He attained two undergraduate degrees from Marion College, and in 1904 earned dual M.S. and M.D. degrees from the University of Illinois College of Physicians & Surgeons. After graduation, he practiced medicine in Wisconsin before relocating to Winston-Salem, North Carolina in 1910.

While working as a physician and surgeon in North Carolina, Schallert took up botany. He became a prolific plant collector, and taught the subject at Salem College. In 1943, he served the Army Medical Corps in Seattle, Washington. After the war, he moved to Altamonte Springs, Florida.

== Political activism ==
Schallert was an avid socialist. He was a member of the North Carolina State Executive Committee of the Socialist Party and of the Winston-Salem City Committee of the Socialist Party. He was an advocate for the style of medical care provided in the Soviet Union.

In 1935, Schallert visited the Soviet Union as a representative of the Socialist Party of North Carolina. Following his visit, he published a series of essays titled, "Russia: Yesterday, Today, and Tomorrow".

== Personal life and death ==
Schallert married his wife, Flora Grace Jackson, on 16 May 1904. They had four children. One of their children, the chemist Paul O. Schallert, Jr., also collected plant specimens.

Schallert died at the age of 90 on 30 January 1970 while living in Freehold Township, New Jersey.

== Legacy ==
The herbarium of the University of North Carolina at Chapel Hill houses several hundreds of specimens collected by Schallert. Throughout his lifetime, his personal collected reached 50,000 specimens. The Fort Worth Botanic Garden has archived the Paul O. Schallert Papers, a collection of correspondences between Schallert and other botanists such as Otto Degener.
