= Kari Underly =

American meat cutter and educator

Kari Underly is an American meat cutter and educator. She is also the CEO of Range, Inc. located in Chicago. Underly has provided classes on how to butcher animals, including creating online training. She has also helped develop software and cuts of meat for the National Cattlemen's Beef Association (NCBA). In 2011 she published The Art of Beef Cutting.

== Biography ==
Underly comes from a family of meat cutters. Her maternal grandmother, Harriet Austin, owned a market with her husband and maintained her meat-cutter's license into her nineties. Her paternal grandmother, Cylia, worked as a butcher on a farm during the Great Depression. Underly grew up in South Bend, Indiana.

Underly started her career by working in her father's butcher shop. Underly attended Southwestern Michigan College for two years. Then she worked at Martin's Super Market in South Bend, starting in 1988 and was eventually accepted into the apprentice meat cutter's program. Underly worked as an apprentice for three years. She did experience sexism at work, with some men refusing to train her. However, her ability to cut meat allowed her to make enough money to put herself through college. She graduated from Indiana Wesleyan University in 1995.

Underly started working with the National Cattlemen's Beef Association (NCBA) in 1997 to create pricing software for retailers. Later, she worked with NCBA to create new cuts of steak, including the flatiron steak and the Denver Cut. In 2002, she started Range, Inc. in Fulton Market in Chicago where she is the CEO. Underly has also taught classes on how to butcher animals. She developed online training.

In 2011, she published a book, The Art of Beef Cutting, which was a James Beard Foundation Award finalist. The book deals with the basic principals of meat cutting and includes 450 color photos of each cut.
