= Fred Engelhardt =

American college president

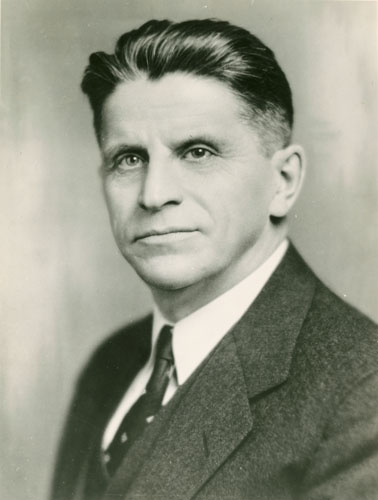

6th President of University of New Hampshire
- In office 1937–1944
- Preceded by: Edward M. Lewis
- Succeeded by: Harold W. Stoke

Personal details
- Born: April 15, 1885 Naugatuck, Connecticut
- Died: February 3, 1944 (aged 58) Durham, New Hampshire
- Education: Yale; Columbia University; M.A. (1915); Ph.D. (1924)

Fred Engelhardt (April 15, 1885 - February 3, 1944) was an American college president. Engelhardt was the sixth president of the University of New Hampshire from 1937 to 1944. He graduated from Phillips Andover Academy. In 1908, Engelhardt went on to Yale and received a bachelor's degree in physics. Engelhardt then received an M.A. (1915) and a Ph.D. (1924) from Columbia University.

In 1942, he oversaw the establishment of the Department of Arts at UNH.

Engelhardt died In Durham from cancer during his tenure.

The University of New Hampshire built a residence hall named Engelhardt Hall in his honor. It was dedicated on June 14, 1947.
