= Marti Jett =

American biochemist

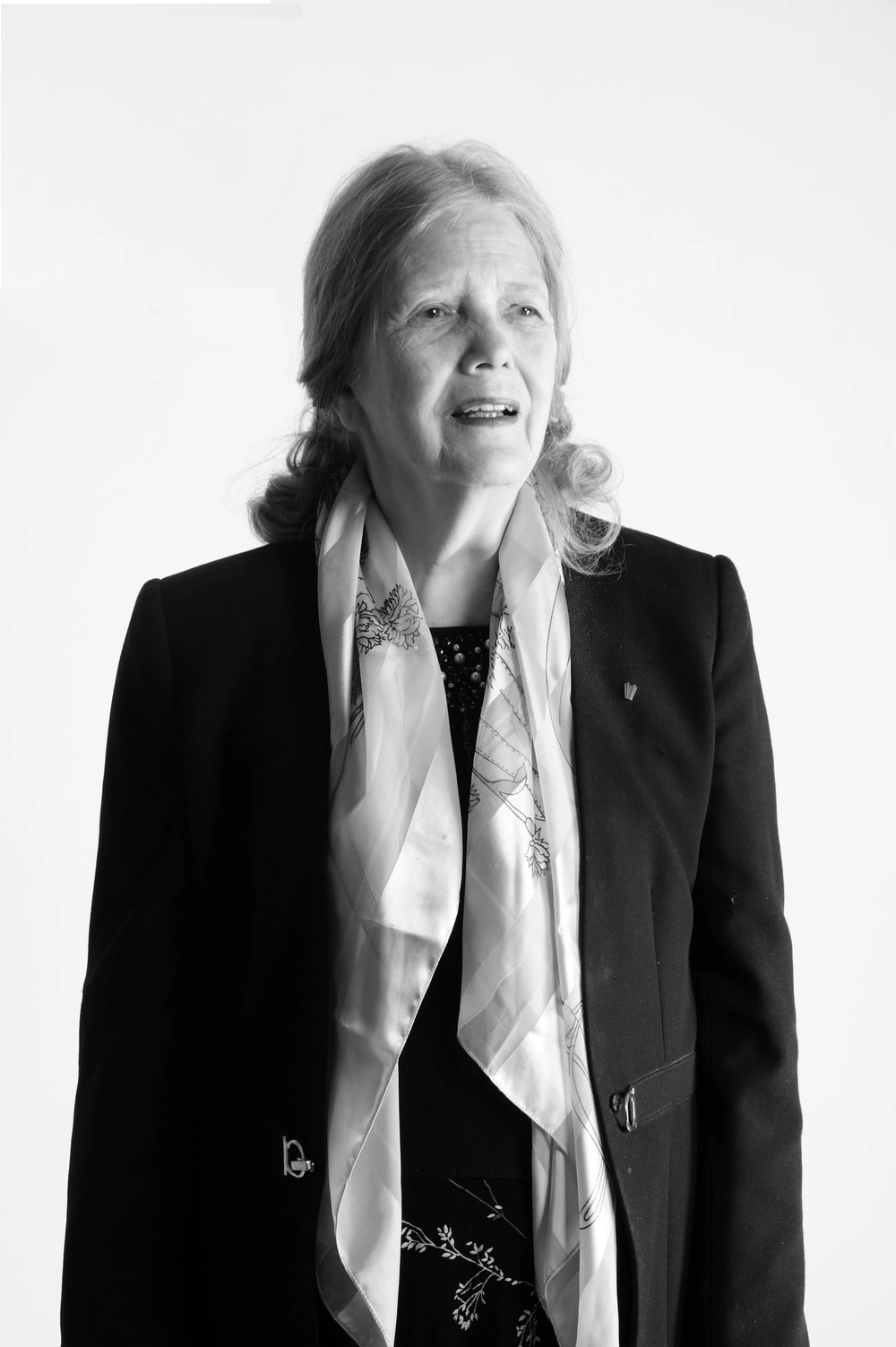
- Jett in 2021
- Born: Marion, Ohio, U.S.
- Education: Indiana Wesleyan University; Georgetown University
- Scientific career
- Fields: Biochemistry, PTSD
- Workplaces: U.S. Army Center for Environmental Health Research

Marti Jett is an American biochemist who researches post-traumatic stress disorder and coagulopathy at the U.S. Army Center for Environmental Health Research. She is the chief of the department of molecular pathology.

== Life ==
Born and raised near Marion, Ohio, Jett graduated from Indiana Wesleyan University with a degree in chemistry in 1962. She served in the Peace Corps for two years in India. She began her post-graduate studies in physiological chemistry at Ohio State University and received a Ph.D. in biochemistry from Georgetown University. She began her doctoral career at the Blood Research Laboratory in Bethesda, Maryland.

Jett joined the Walter Reed Army Institute of Research in 1981 where she was appointed chief of the department of molecular pathology 15 years later. In 2011, she became the director of the integrative systems biology program at the U.S. Army Center for Environmental Health Research (USACEHR) at Fort Detrick where she leads research in post-traumatic stress disorder and coagulopathy. Jett also serves as a principal investigator on research grants from multiple organizations within the United States Department of Defense and the National Institutes of Health. She is an adjunct research professor at Georgetown University, Howard University, and Pennsylvania State University. She co-founded the Gains in the Education of Mathematics and Science program and helped shape the Science and Engineering Apprenticeship Program. Jett was inducted into the Senior Executive Service as a science and technology professional on November 24, 2014, during a ceremony. As of 2022, she is the chief of the department of molecular pathology.
