= James Huffman (historian) =

American historian (born 1941)

James L. Huffman
- Born: October 17, 1941 (age 84)
- Education: Indiana Wesleyan University (BA); Northwestern University; University of Michigan
- Occupation: Historian

James L. Huffman (born October 17, 1941) is an American historian, specializing in Japanese and East Asian history.

== Career ==
Huffman obtained a Bachelor of Arts degree at Indiana Wesleyan University, and studied journalism at Northwestern University before he completed graduate study at the University of Michigan, earning a master's degree in Asian studies and a doctorate in history. Huffman worked as a journalist prior to teaching at the University of Nebraska–Lincoln, Indiana Wesleyan University, Williams College, and Dartmouth College. He joined the faculty of Wittenberg University, where he was named H. Orth Hirt Professor of History and taught for three decades until his retirement in May 2007. In March 2017, the Association for Asian Studies honored Huffman with its Distinguished Service Award.

== Bibliography ==
- Creating a Public: People and Press in Meiji Japan. University of Hawaii Press. 1997. ISBN 9780824818821.
- A Yankee in Meiji Japan: The Crusading Journalist Edward H. House. Rowman & Littlefield Publishers. 2003. ISBN 9780742526211.
- Japan in World History. Oxford University Press. 2010. ISBN 9780199798841.
- Modern Japan: A History in Documents. Oxford University Press. 2011. ISBN 9780195392531.
- Japan and Imperialism, 1853-1945. Association for Asian Studies. 2017.
- Down and Out in Late Meiji Japan. University of Hawaii Press. 2018. ISBN 9780824872915.
