= Indiana Wesleyan University =

Christian university in Marion, Indiana, US

- Former name: Marion College (1920–1988)
- Motto: Character. Scholarship. Leadership.
- Type: Private university
- Established: 1920; 106 years ago
- Religious affiliation: Wesleyan Church
- Academic affiliations: CCCU
- Endowment: $309.9 million (2025)
- President: Jonathan Kulaga
- Students: 2,161 (Marion campus - undergrad, 2026); 16,921 (total enrollment, 2026)
- Location: Marion, Indiana, U.S. 40.519°N 85.665°W
- Campus: Suburban 350 acres (140 ha)
- Newspaper: The Sojourn
- Colors: Red and gray
- Nickname: Wildcats
- Sporting affiliations: NAIA; Crossroads League (primary); Mid-States Football Association (football); Mid-South Conference (swimming); NCCAA
- Mascot: Wesley the Wildcat
- Website: indwes.edu
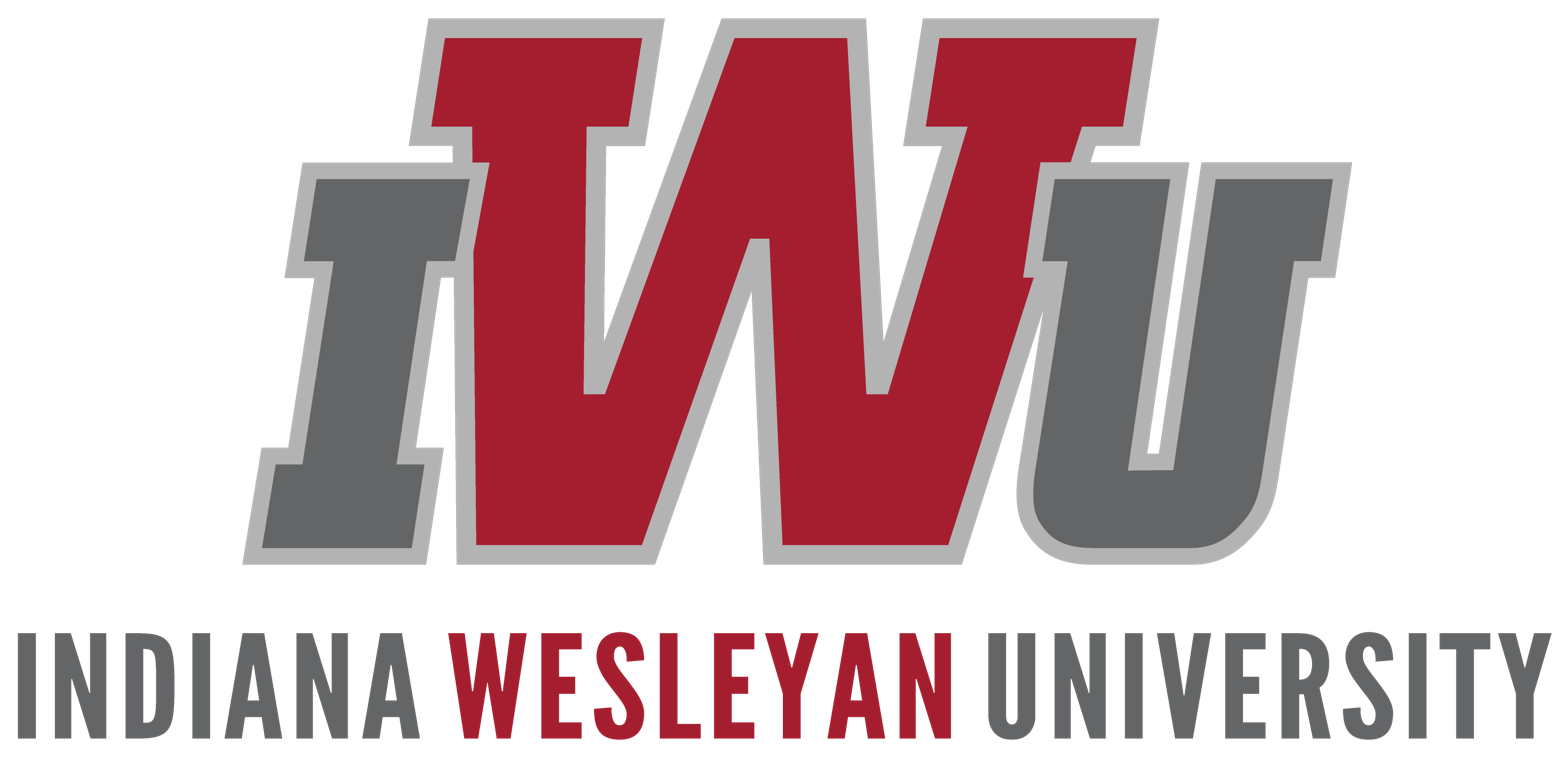

Indiana Wesleyan University (IWU) is a private evangelical Christian university headquartered in Marion, Indiana and affiliated with the Wesleyan Church. It is the largest private university in Indiana with nearly 17,000 total students.

The university system includes IWU Marion, where nearly 2,200 undergraduate students are enrolled in traditional programs on the main campus in Marion and IWU National and Global which consists of approximately 14,000 adult learners who study online or onsite at 15 education centers in Indiana, Kentucky and Ohio. In addition, 700 graduate students are currently enrolled at Wesley Seminary.

IWU offers more than 80 undergraduate degrees and 57 graduate degrees including nine doctoral degrees. Its students represent more than 80 Christian denominations and come from 11 countries.

== History ==
IWU's campus was known first as Marion Normal College (1890–1912) and then as Marion Normal Institute (1912–1918).

In 1918, the Marion Normal Institute relocated to Muncie, Indiana, and merged with the Indiana Normal Institute. After the union failed, the buildings and grounds were purchased for the state of Indiana and formed the basis for Ball State University. Because the Indiana Conference of the Wesleyan Methodist Church operated the Fairmount Bible School 10 miles (16 km) south of Marion, local citizens asked them to move to the vacant property and open a normal school in Marion. So from 1918 to 1919 the conference raised $100,000 to endow the school, moved the Fairmount Bible School to Marion, and added a new teacher education program to become Marion College. The actual year of incorporation was 1919; however, the first classes were not offered until the fall of 1920, which became the official year of inception.

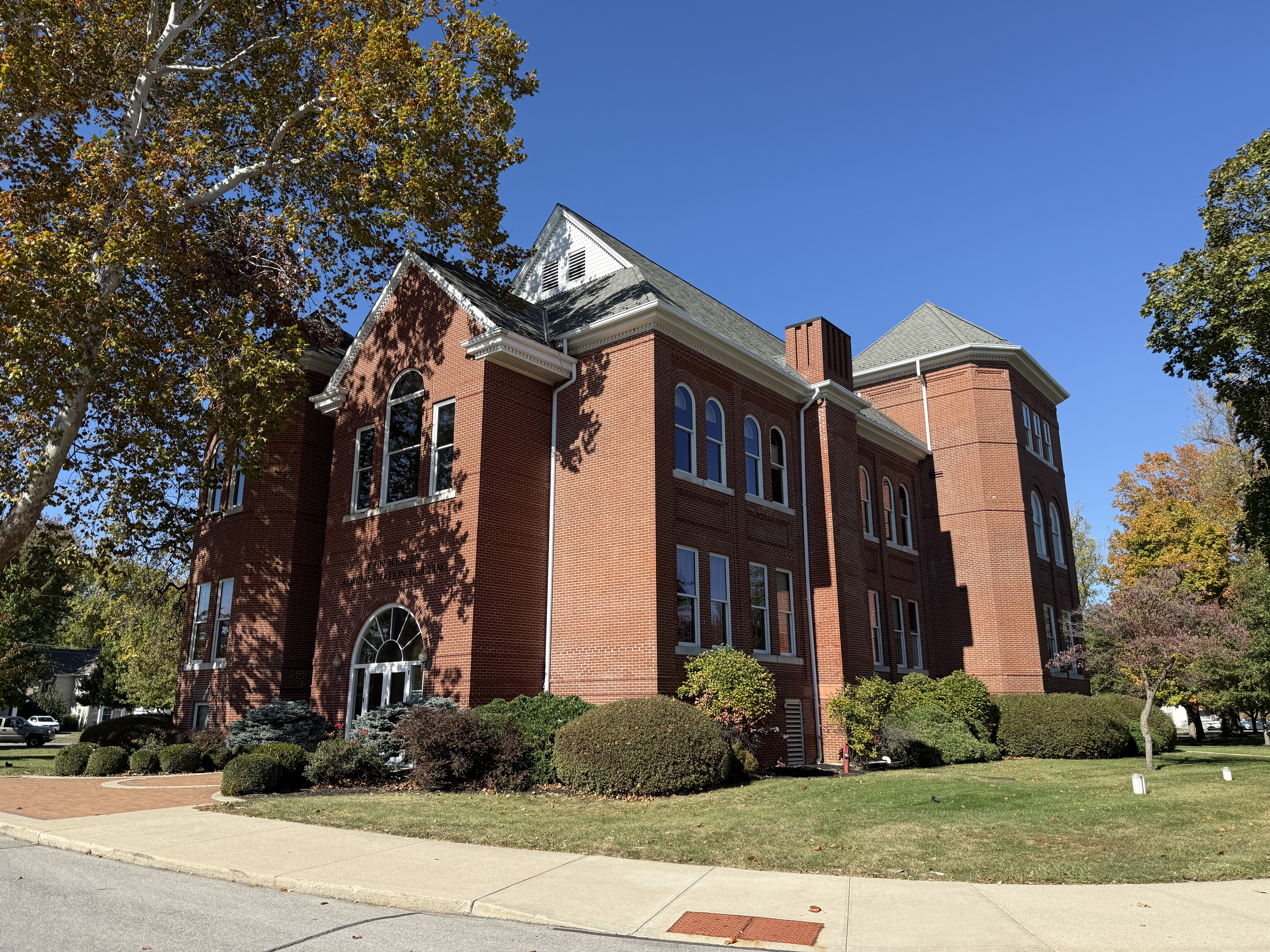
John Wesley Administration Building (1894, 2003)

From 1920 to 1988, Marion College operated as a developing liberal arts institution with growing programs, offering Bachelor of Arts and Bachelor of Science degrees since the first graduating class of 1921. A Master of Arts in Theology was begun in 1924 and offered continuously until 1950. Master's degree programs were initiated again in 1979 in Ministerial Education and Community Health Nursing. Master's degree programs were begun in Business in 1988, in Primary Care Nursing in 1994, and in Counseling in 1995.

Having already established a liberal arts college, in 1983, university leadership decided to begin offering courses and degrees to working adults during evening hours and Saturdays, forming what would eventually become IWU National and Global. This decision proved to be very successful and massively affected IWU's future, eventually eliminating the school's sizable debt and funding the revitalization and expansion of the Marion campus, transforming the college into a major evangelical Christian university. To this day, IWU National and Global provides the majority of the funding used in campus renovation and construction projects, keeping student tuition at a relatively low level compared with other similar colleges.

Enrollment in IWU National and Global grew substantially since 1985 when the first courses were offered. By 2008 the university had grown by more than 200 percent since 1990 to educate nearly 14,000 students, over 10,000 of whom were taking courses online or at IWU National and Global's regional Education Centers in Indiana, Ohio, and Kentucky. Site-based classes are held at 14 Education Centers: Indianapolis North and West, Fort Wayne, Kokomo, Greenwood, Merrillville, and Marion, Indiana; Cincinnati, Cleveland, Columbus and Dayton, Ohio; Louisville, Lexington, and Florence, Kentucky. Programs are also available at a number of learning sites located throughout Indiana, Kentucky and Ohio. Since 1997, most of these programs have been available online.

A new administration was initiated by the board of trustees with the presidency of Dr. James Barnes in 1987. The name of the institution was changed to Indiana Wesleyan University in 1988, reflecting the influence of the institution across the state - well beyond the boundaries of the city of Marion, its connection with the Wesleyan Church and Christian higher education, and the development of increasing numbers of graduate programs.

Barnes served as president from 1987 to 2006 and is credited with transforming IWU from a small, struggling Christian college into one of the largest and most successful evangelical Christian universities in the world. Barnes served as the university's first chancellor from 2006 to 2010. In 2006 Dr. Henry Smith succeeded Barnes as president. In 2010, the Student Center was renamed the Barnes Student Center, in his honor.

In 2008 the Board of Trustees approved a motion to begin the process of establishing Wesley Seminary at Indiana Wesleyan University, an evangelical seminary affiliated with both the university and the Wesleyan Church. In 2009 the seminary was approved and accredited, becoming the first officially affiliated seminary in the history of the Wesleyan Church denomination. Wesley offers the Master of Divinity degree along with other graduate theological degrees and had its own building on campus from 2013 to 2025, a result of the university receiving a substantial donation from the Green family, owners of the Hobby Lobby corporation. However, in 2025 the seminary relocated to the university's National and Global headquarters building, a short distance from the campus, so the former Wesley building could be renovated into the university's new Welcome Center.

In 2012 Smith announced his resignation as president and reassignment as chancellor. He was succeeded as president by Dr. David Wright, who was inaugurated in 2013.

In 2013 the board of trustees voted to acquire Wesley Institute (now Excelsia College), in New South Wales, Australia, to create IWU's first international campus.

The university was granted an exception to Title IX in 2017. Homosexual acts are prohibited for students, including kissing and all acts "equated culturally with homosexual behavior."

In 2022 Wright resigned and Dr. Jonathan Kulaga was named the university's tenth president.

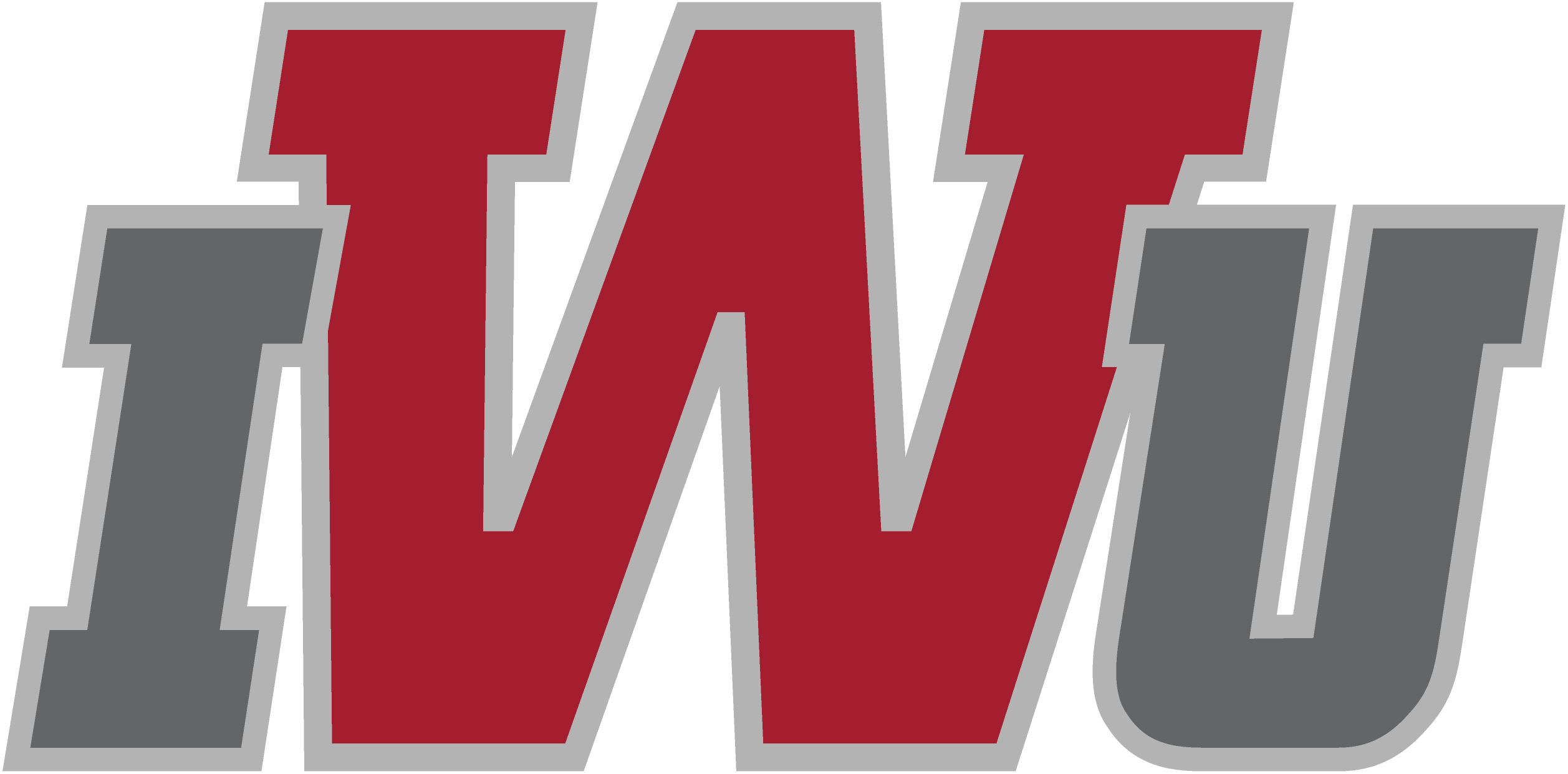

IWU is the largest private university in Indiana. Among the 105 members of the Council for Christian Colleges and Universities (the main organization of evangelical colleges in the U.S. and Canada), IWU is its largest member with 15,000 students enrolled as of 2025.

While by 2008 the university had neared its long-term goal of 3,000 enrolled undergraduate students, the 2008 financial crisis led to the end of the university's decades-long growth during the 2008–09 academic year, as happened to most similar private colleges. Both the university's traditional and adult student enrollments began decreasing in subsequent years. While some recovery in growth was made in later years the 2020 COVID-19 pandemic eliminated any progress that had been made since 2008. Today, while the adult student enrollment has largely recovered, the traditional student enrollment has not, with 2,000 undergraduate students enrolled during the 2025–26 academic year. However, in the 2025 President's Report, the university stated their goal is to reach 20,000 total students.

== Academics ==
The university offers various liberal arts (including 87 undergraduate majors) and professional educational programs leading to the Associate of Arts, Associate of Science, Bachelor of Arts, Bachelor of Science, Bachelor of Music, Master of Arts, Master of Science, Master of Business Administration, and Master of Divinity degrees, along with a doctoral program in Organizational Leadership.

In 2000, the university organized its academic structure into three colleges; the College of Arts and Sciences (traditional four-year liberal arts education), the College of Graduate Studies (traditional semester-based graduate degrees), and the College of Adult and Professional Studies (non-traditional, accelerated programs for working adults). In 2009, the university realigned its academic structure into five Principal Academic Units: the College of Arts and Sciences, the College of Adult and Professional Studies, the Graduate School, the School of Nursing, and Wesley Seminary.

In December 2022, ATP Flight School and IWU partnered to create degree pathways for pilots who complete their FAA certificates through ATP. Students enrolled at the university, who are ATP alumni, can count their flight training experience as degree credit as well as receiving a tuition discount on certain programs.

=== Rankings ===
In 2013, the university was ranked 17th out of more than 150 universities in the Midwest by U.S. News & World Report. In 2022, Indiana Wesleyan University ranked 13th in the Midwest by U.S. News & World Report.

The university has the largest adult education program in the Council for Christian Colleges and Universities (CCCU). In 2008, the CCCU selected IWU to establish the Research Center in Adult Learning, a joint project with the CCCU.

== Campus ==
Indiana Wesleyan University has a 350-acre (140 ha) main campus in Marion. Since 1990 nearly $300 million has been spent on new construction and renovation, and the campus is valued in excess of $400 million. In the past 35 years, over 50 construction projects have been completed, including more than 15 residence facilities and 17 academic and administrative buildings, along with 11 adult and professional studies structures around the Midwest.

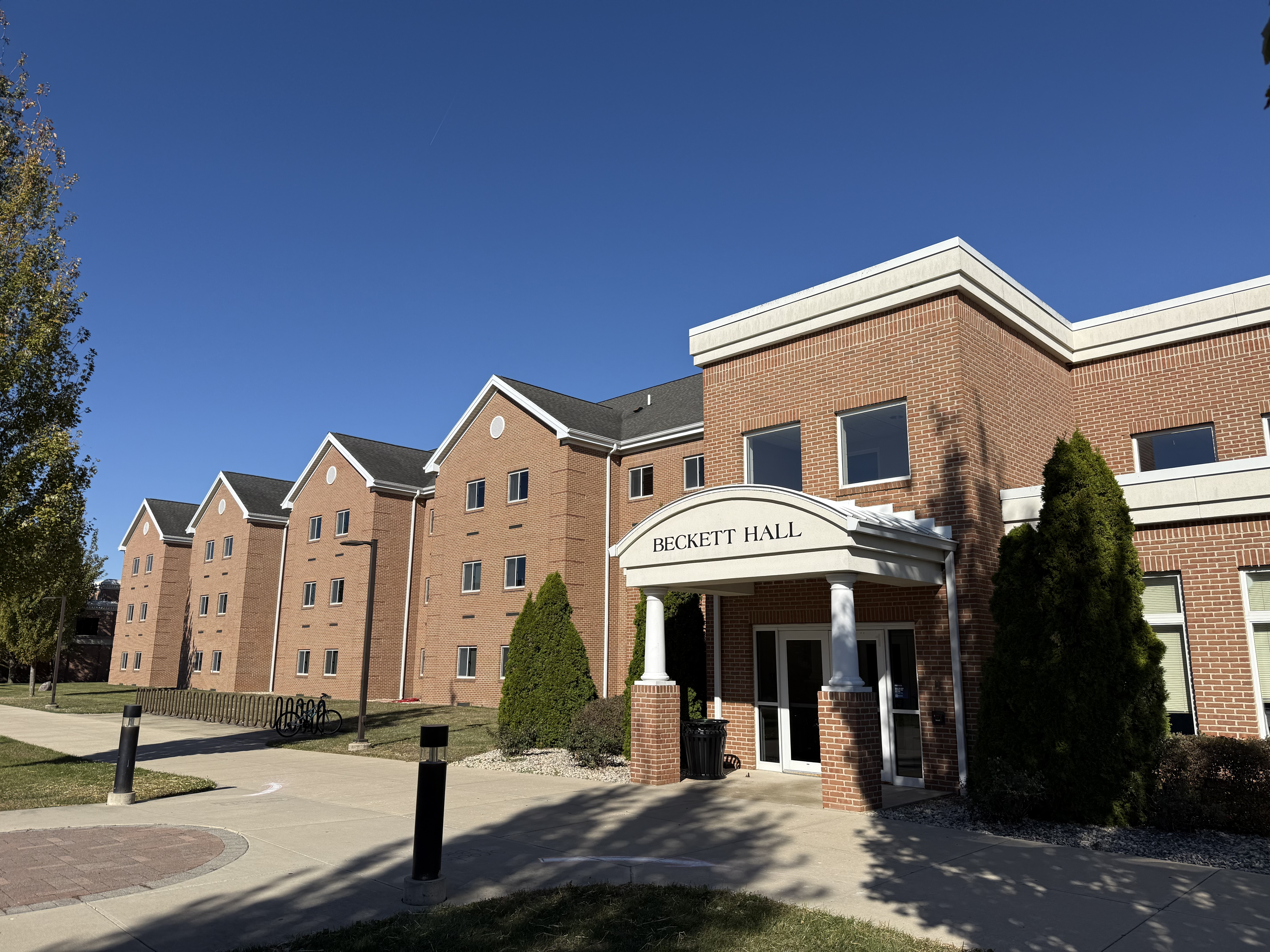
Beckett Hall (2007)

Of special note are the university's student residence facilities, including 11 dormitories (all built since 1990) and several apartment structures. IWU was ranked #1 in the 2018 "Best College Dorms in Indiana" list and #16 on the United States list. Niche.com also ranked IWU's dorms #1 in Indiana in 2022. The university is unique from most colleges in having air conditioning in every room and no community showers in any facility on campus.

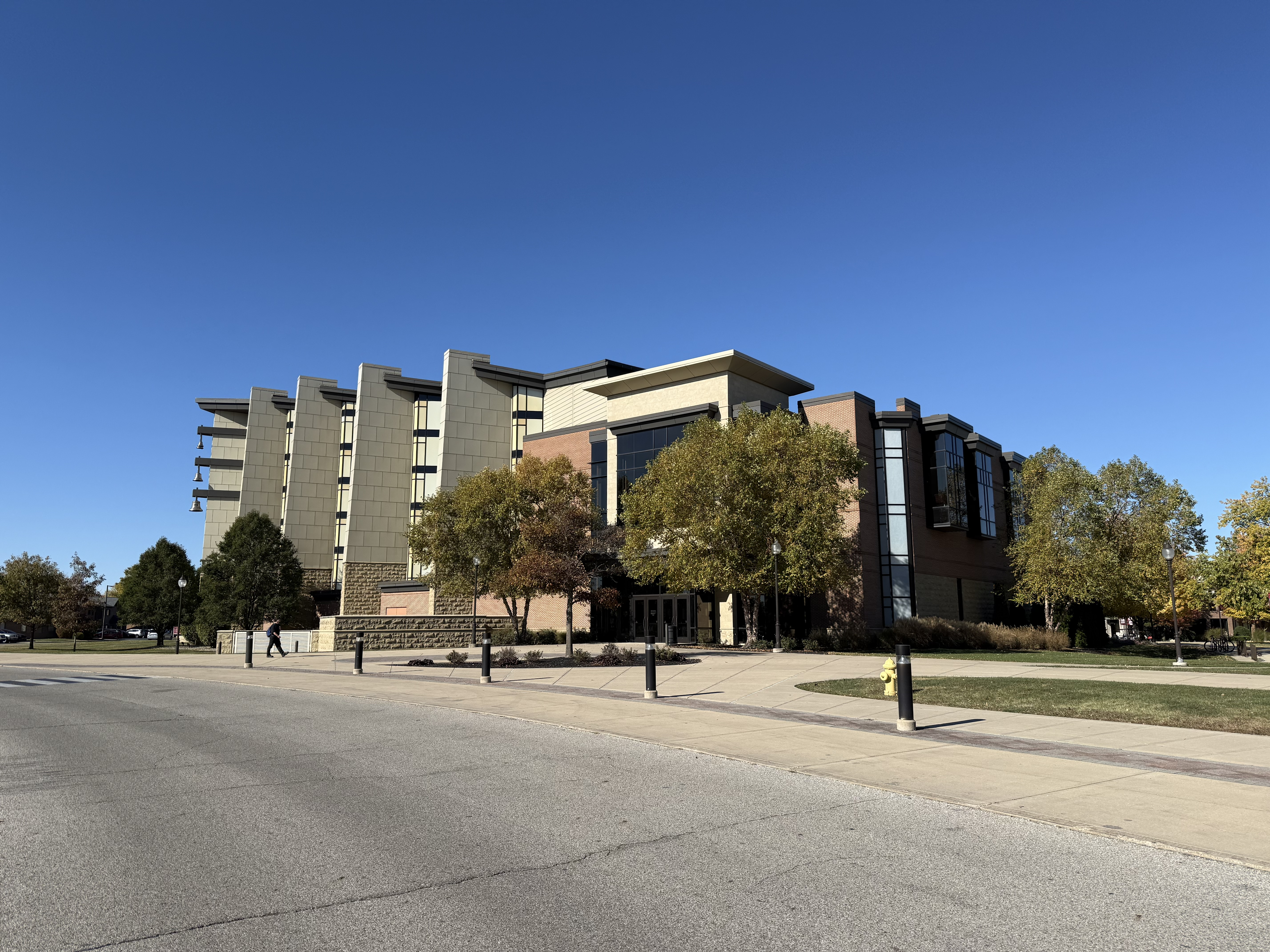
Chapel Auditorium (2010)

In 2010 the university completed the $22 million Chapel Auditorium (where mandatory chapel services are held three days a week). With 3,800 seats, it is one of the largest theaters in the Midwest and was designed to attract major events to Marion, such as musical artists, speakers, and conventions. Visiting artists have included Relient K, Switchfoot, the Gaither Vocal Band, Michael W. Smith, Lauren Daigle and Lecrae.

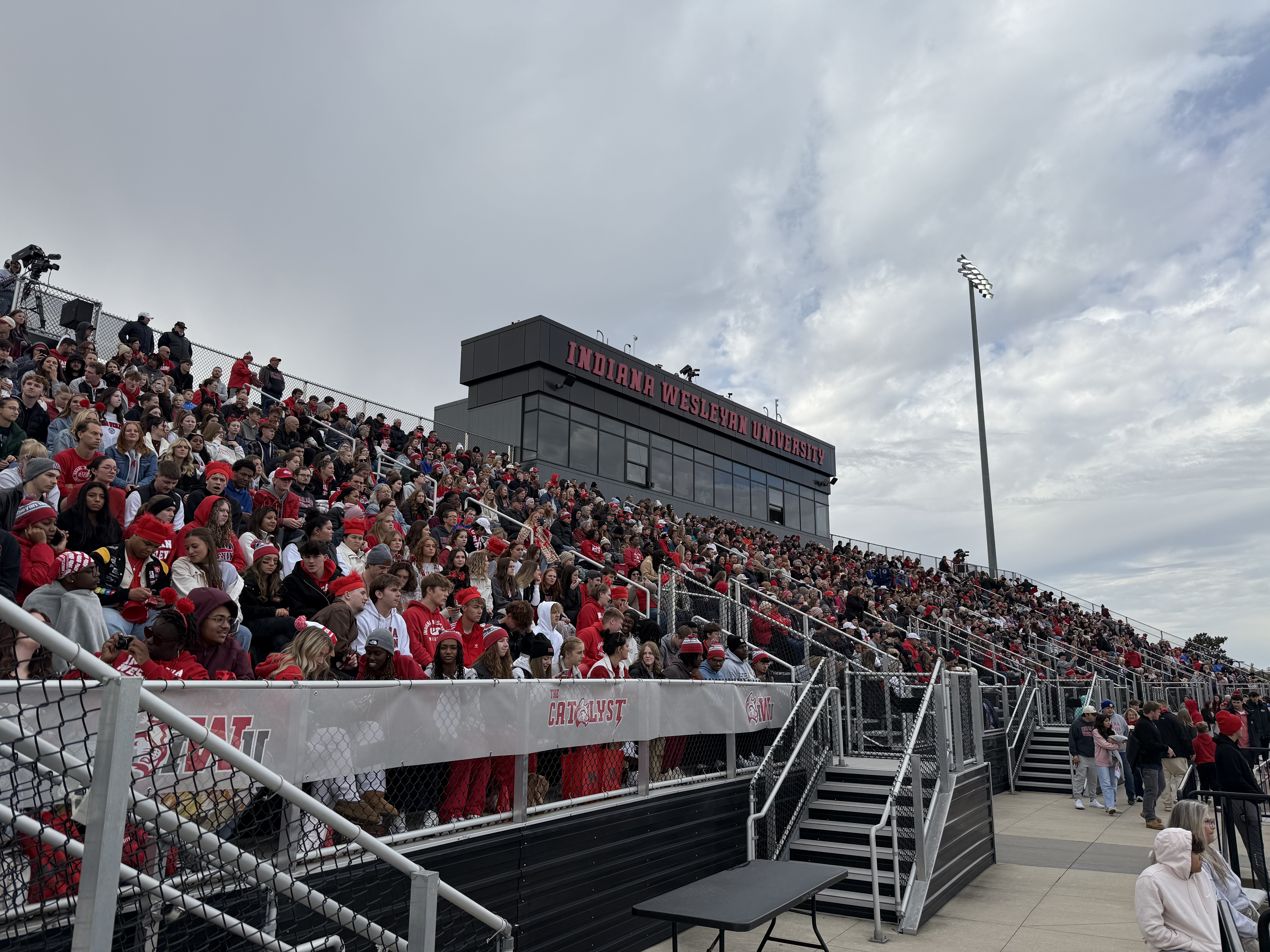
Wildcat Stadium (2018)

In 2018 the university completed 2,500 seat Wildcat Stadium, a state of the art football venue that cost approximately $9 million.

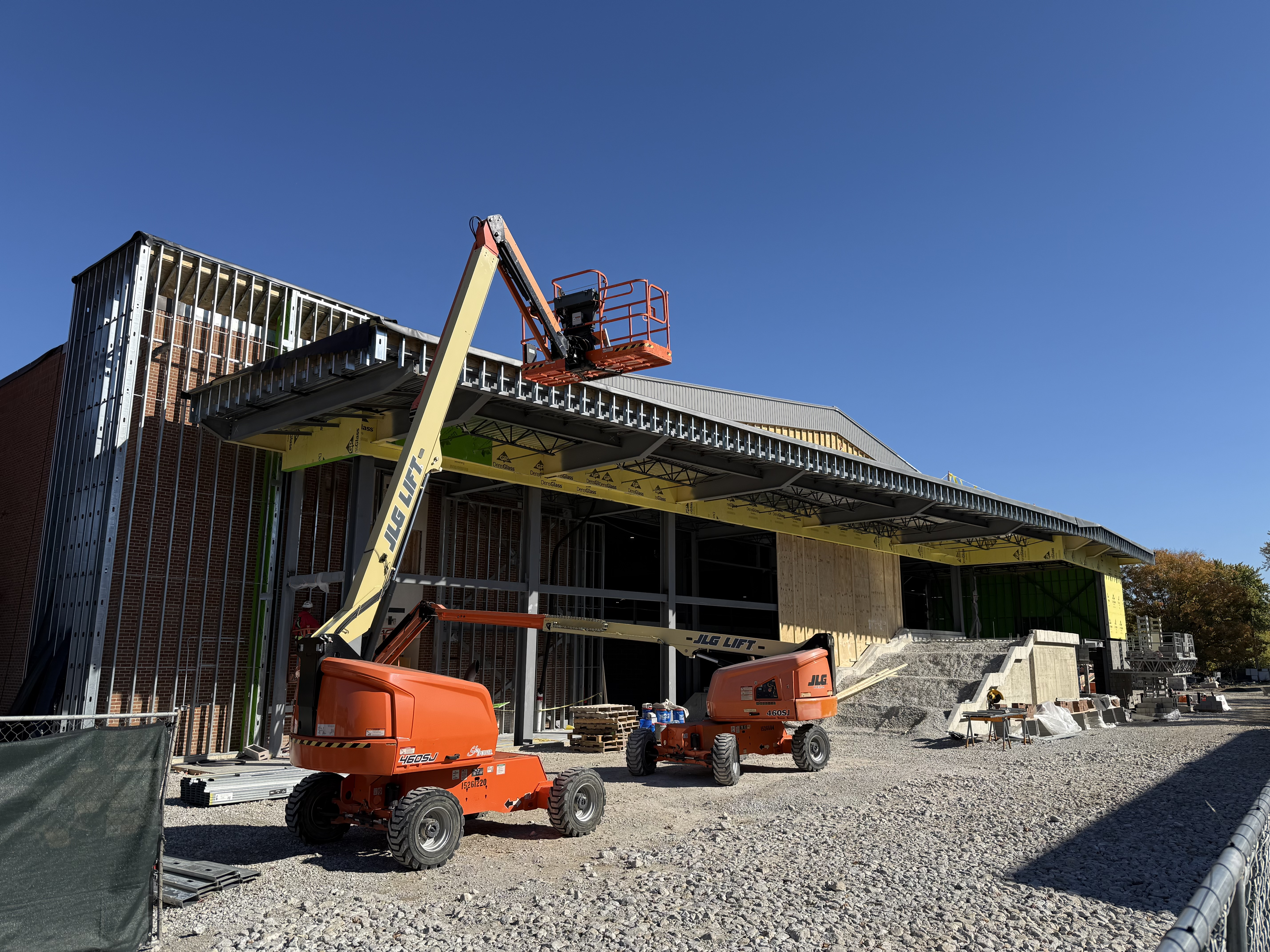
I Am Third Arena During Construction (2025)

In 2026 the university opened a 2,300-seat arena as the new home of the university's basketball programs. At a cost of $30 million the "I Am Third Arena" is the most expensive building project in university history and replaced Luckey Arena which was built in 1980. It features a unique design, incorporating an existing former dormitory (built in 2004), and houses locker and conference rooms, offices, 5 luxury suites, 250 club seats, concessions, a 50-room hotel, and a state-of-the-art practice facility and weight room.

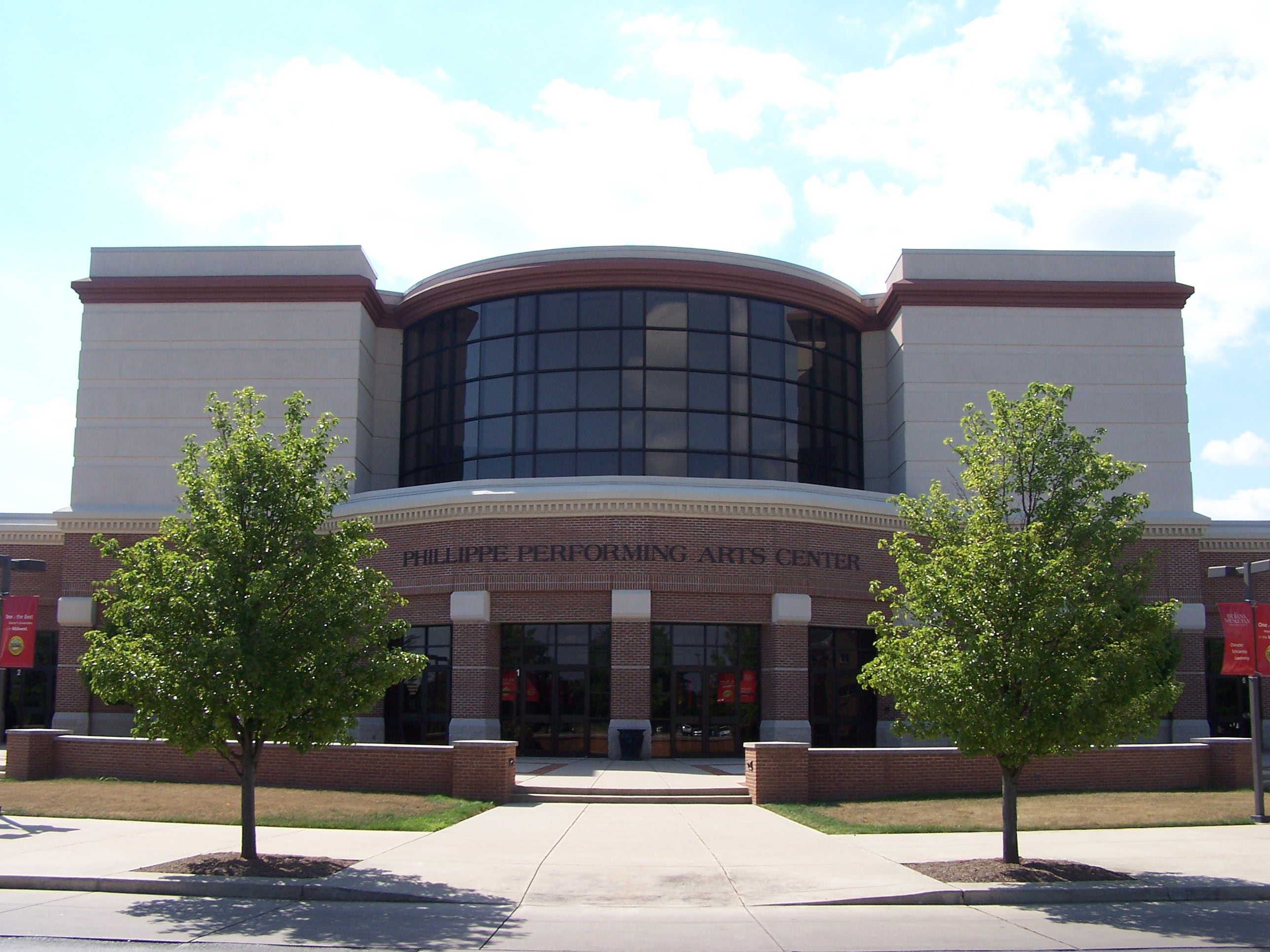
Phillippe Performing Arts Center (1996)

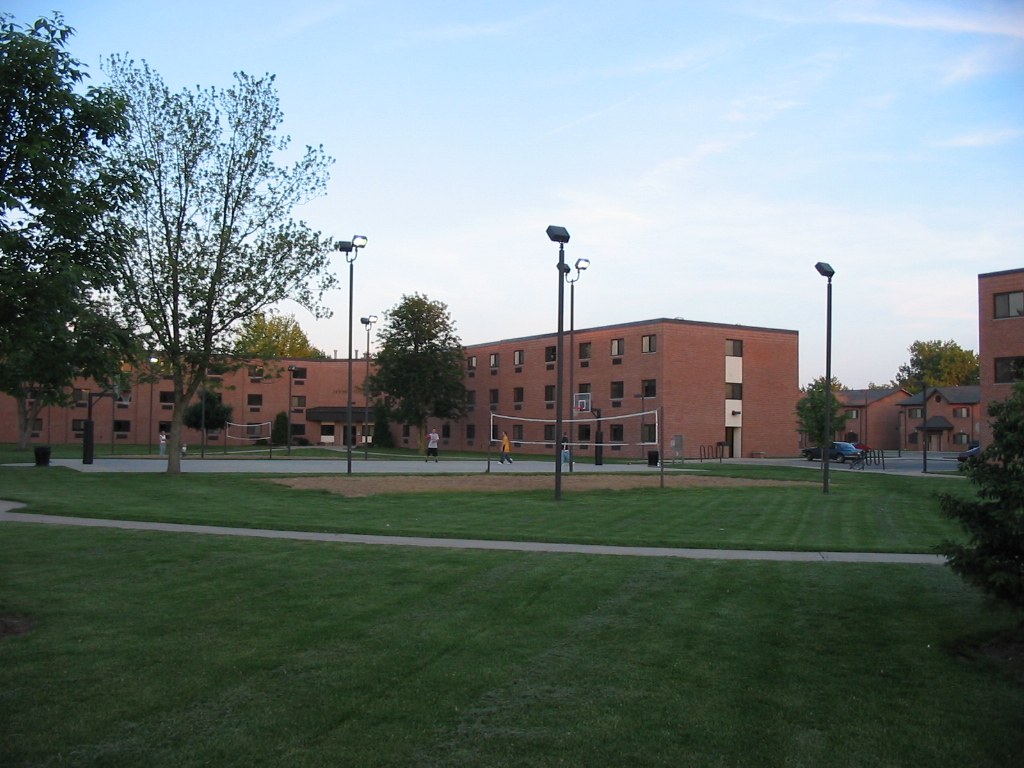
Hodson Hall (1996)

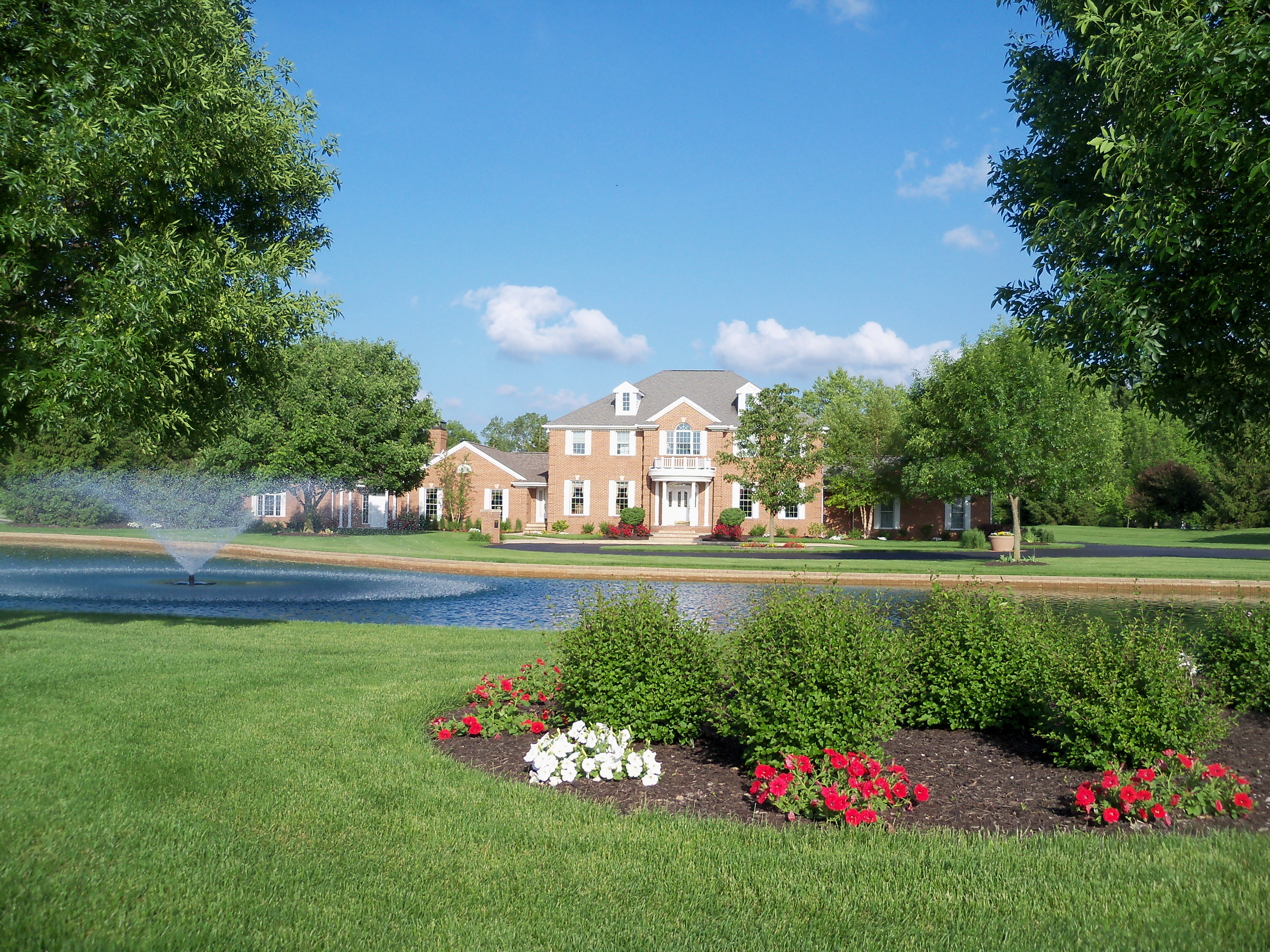
President's Home (1998)

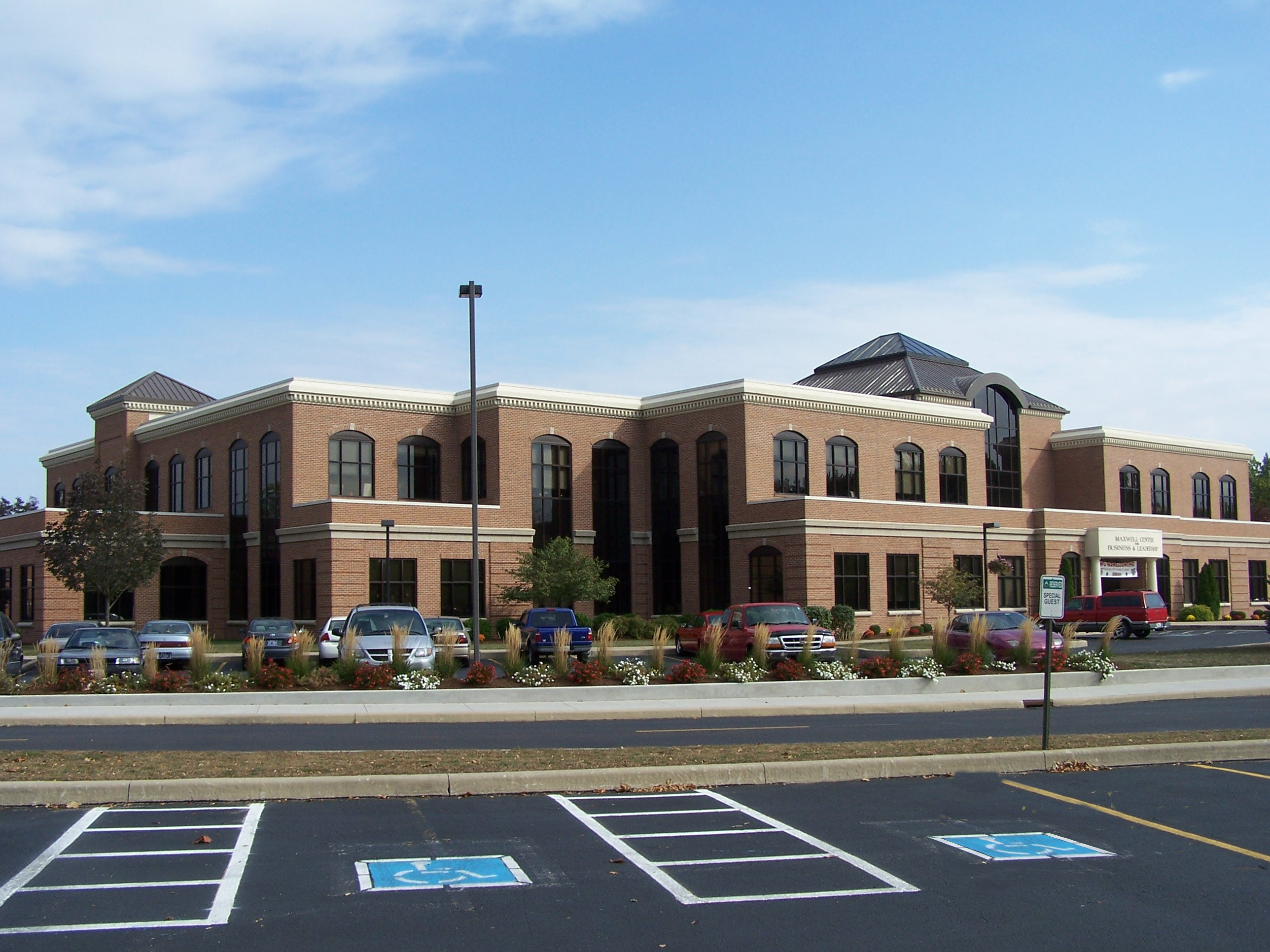
Maxwell Center for Business and Leadership (1998)

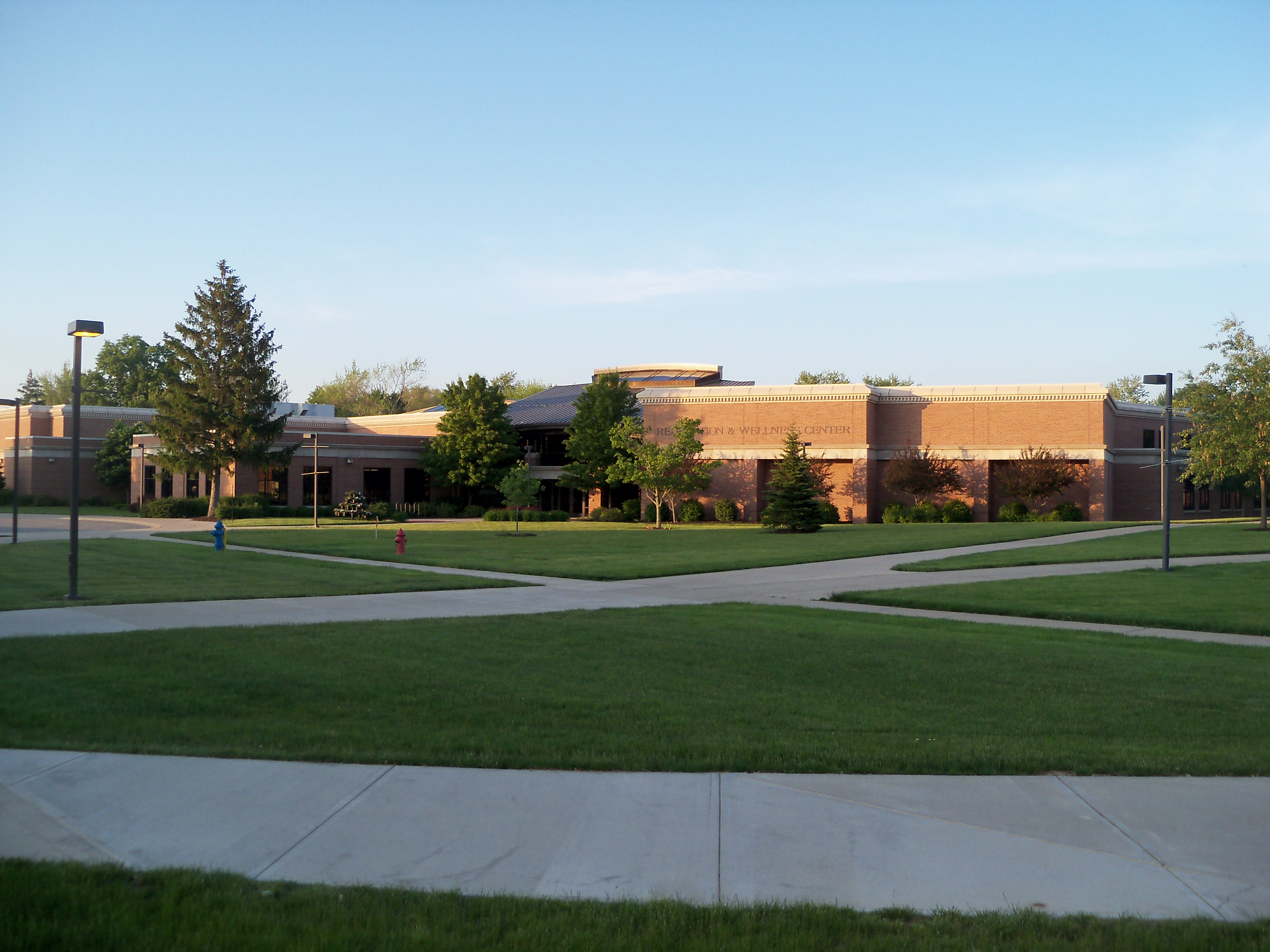
Recreation and Wellness Center (1999)

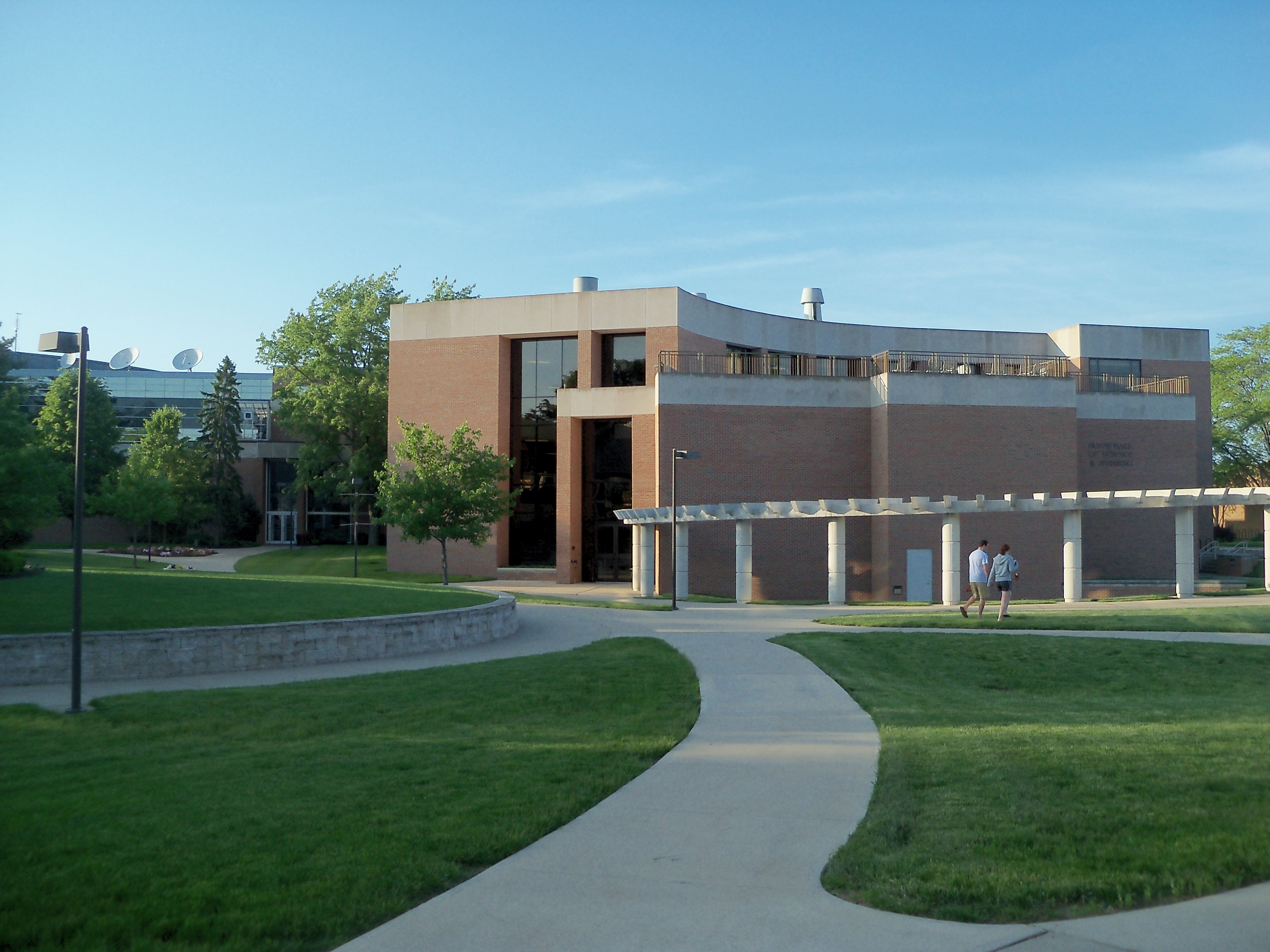
Burns Hall (2000)

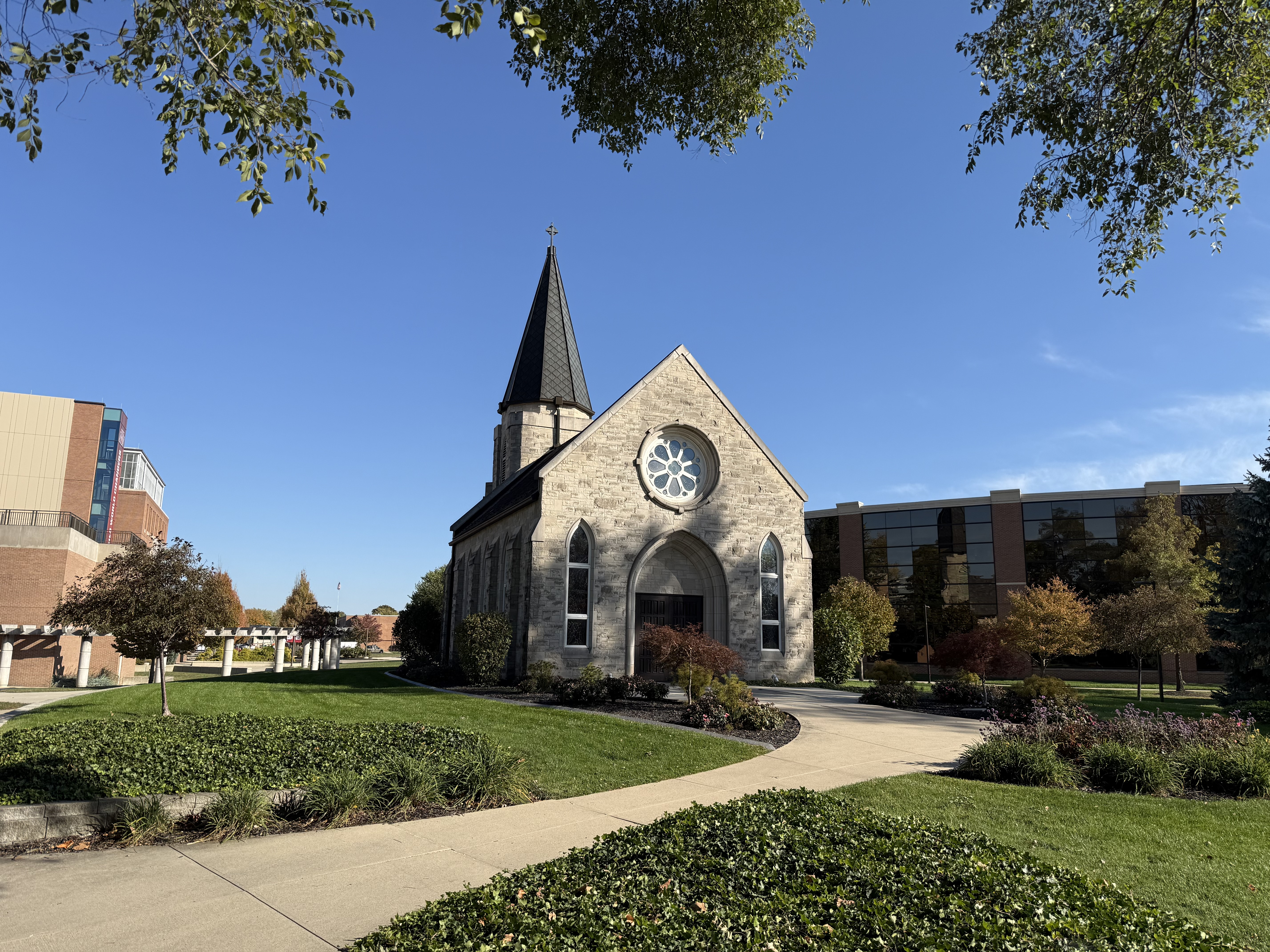
Williams Prayer Chapel (2001)

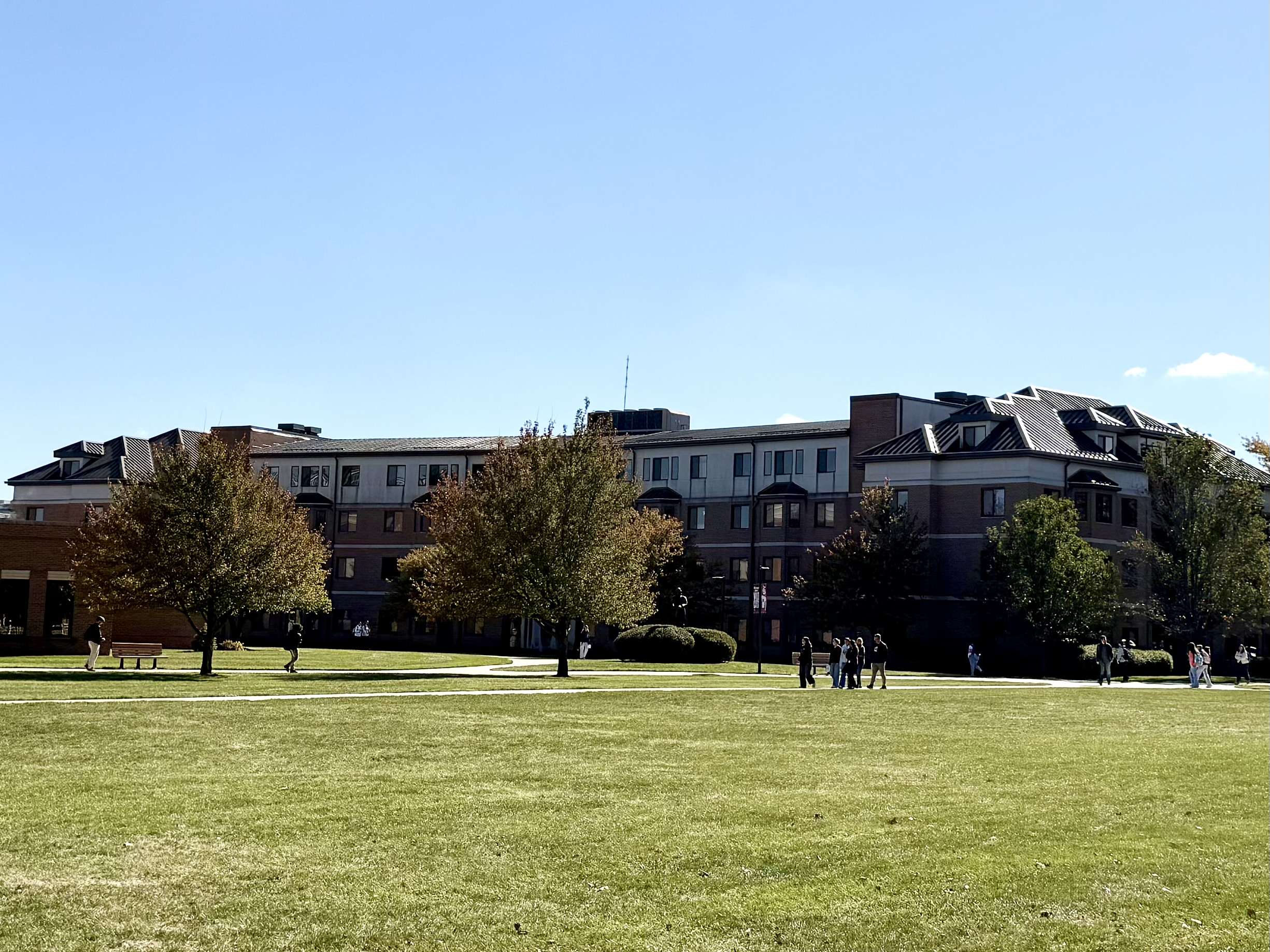
Scripture Hall (2001)

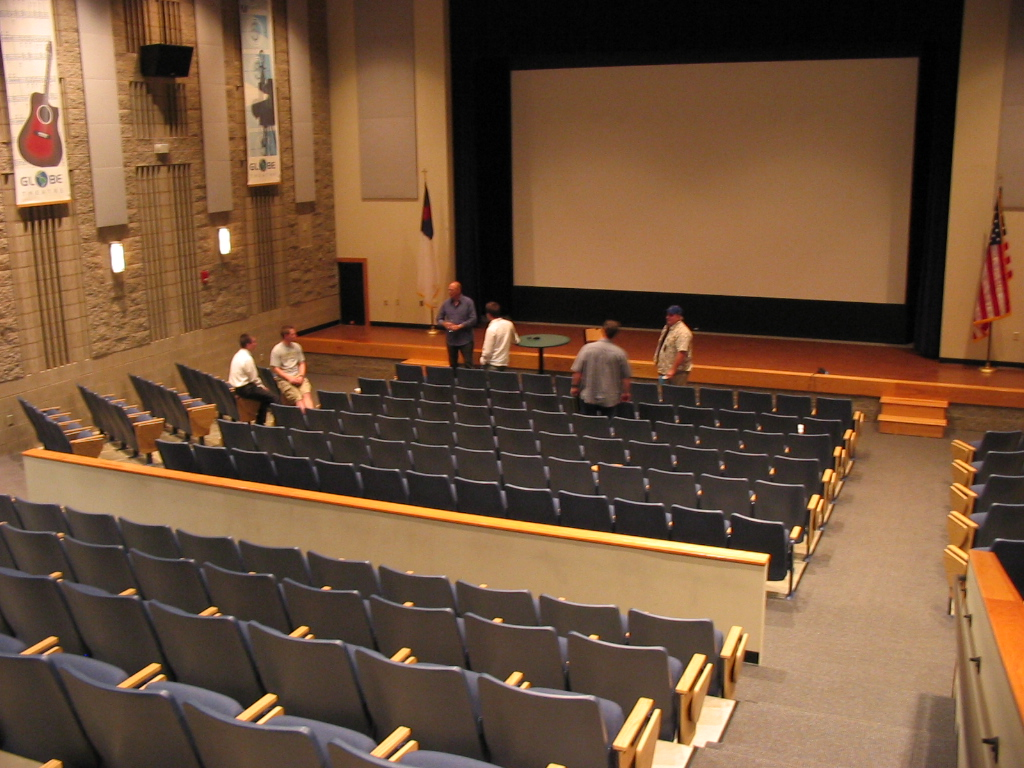
Globe Theatre, Barnes Student Center (2002)

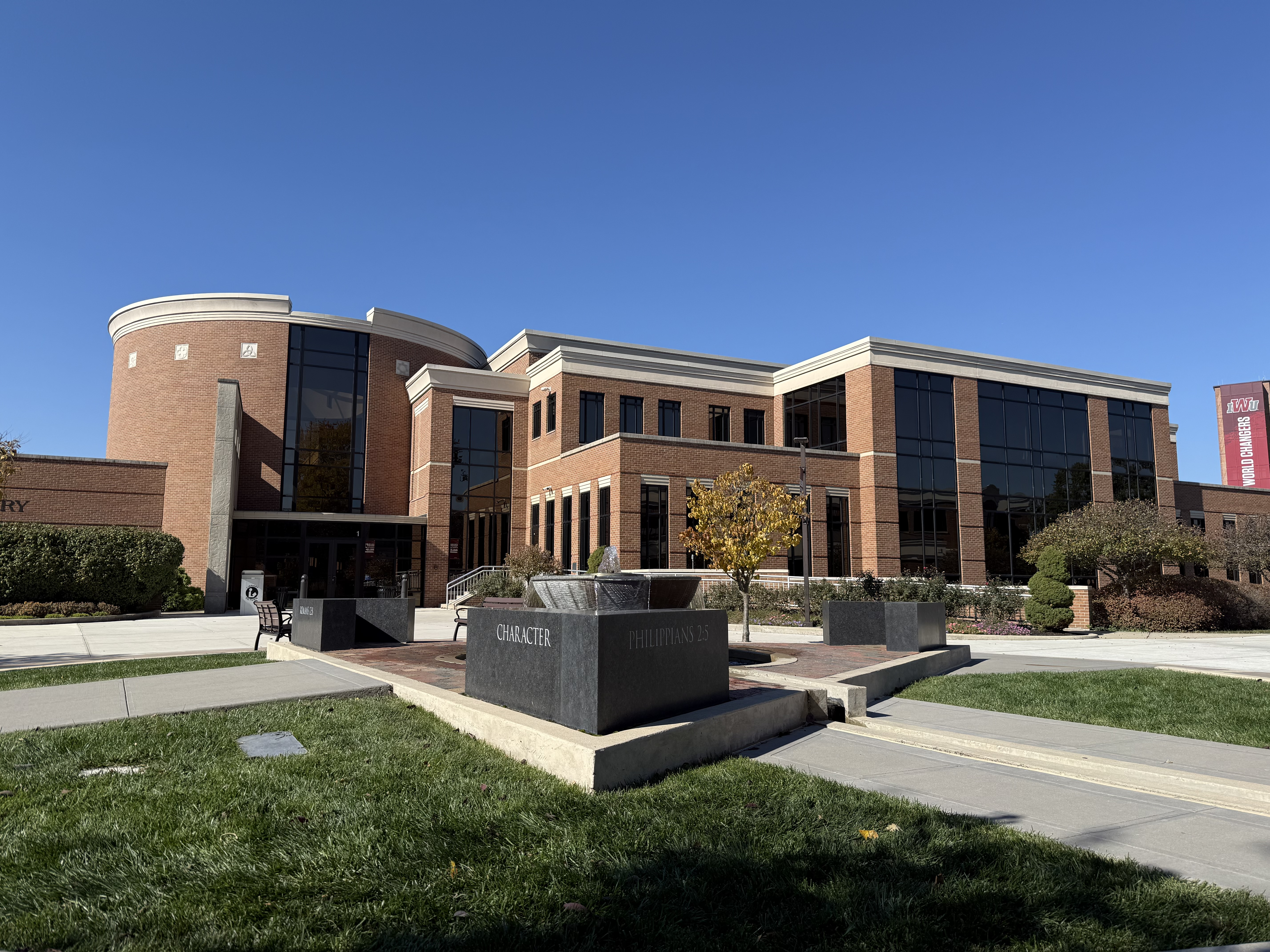
Jackson Library (2003) and University Fountain (2016)

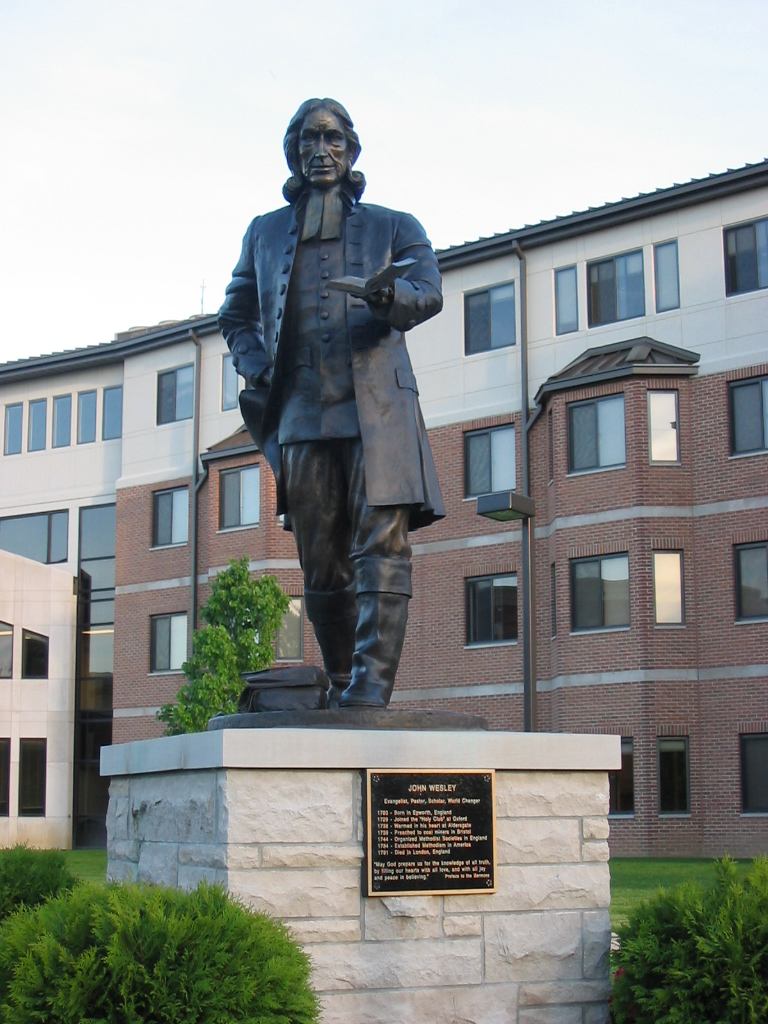
John Wesley Statue (2003)

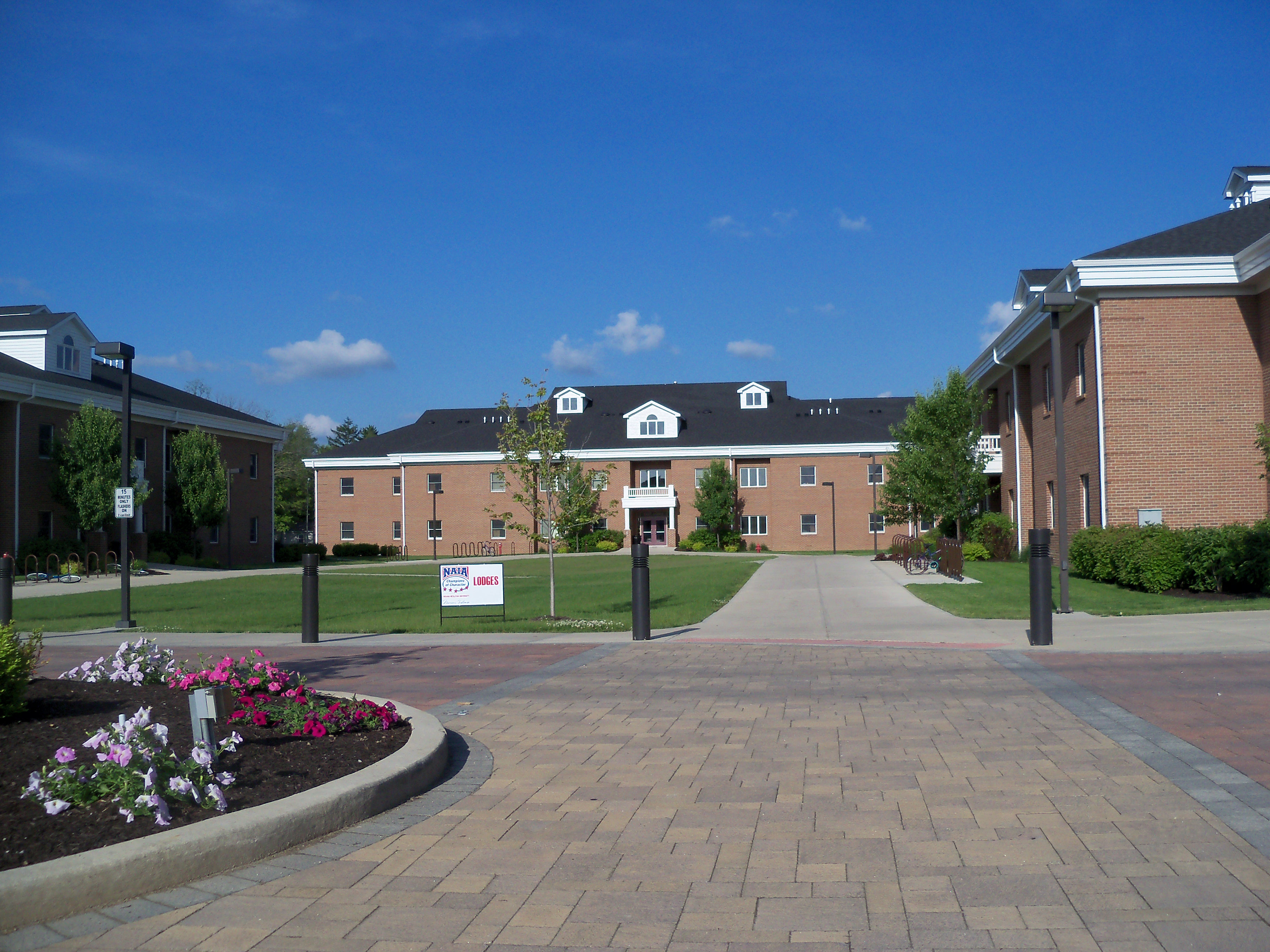
Upperclassman Lodges (2005)

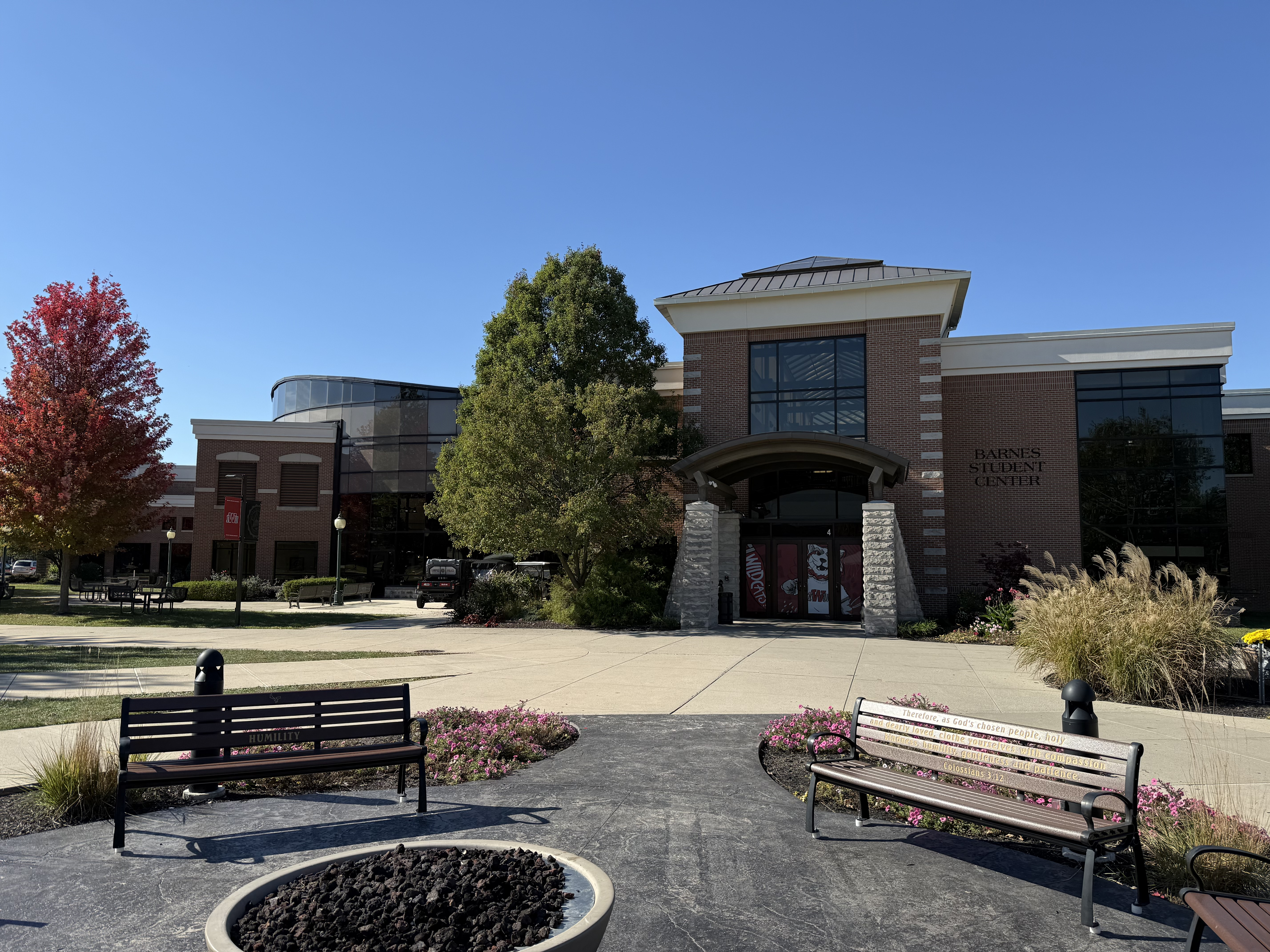
Barnes Student Center (1994, 2001, 2006)

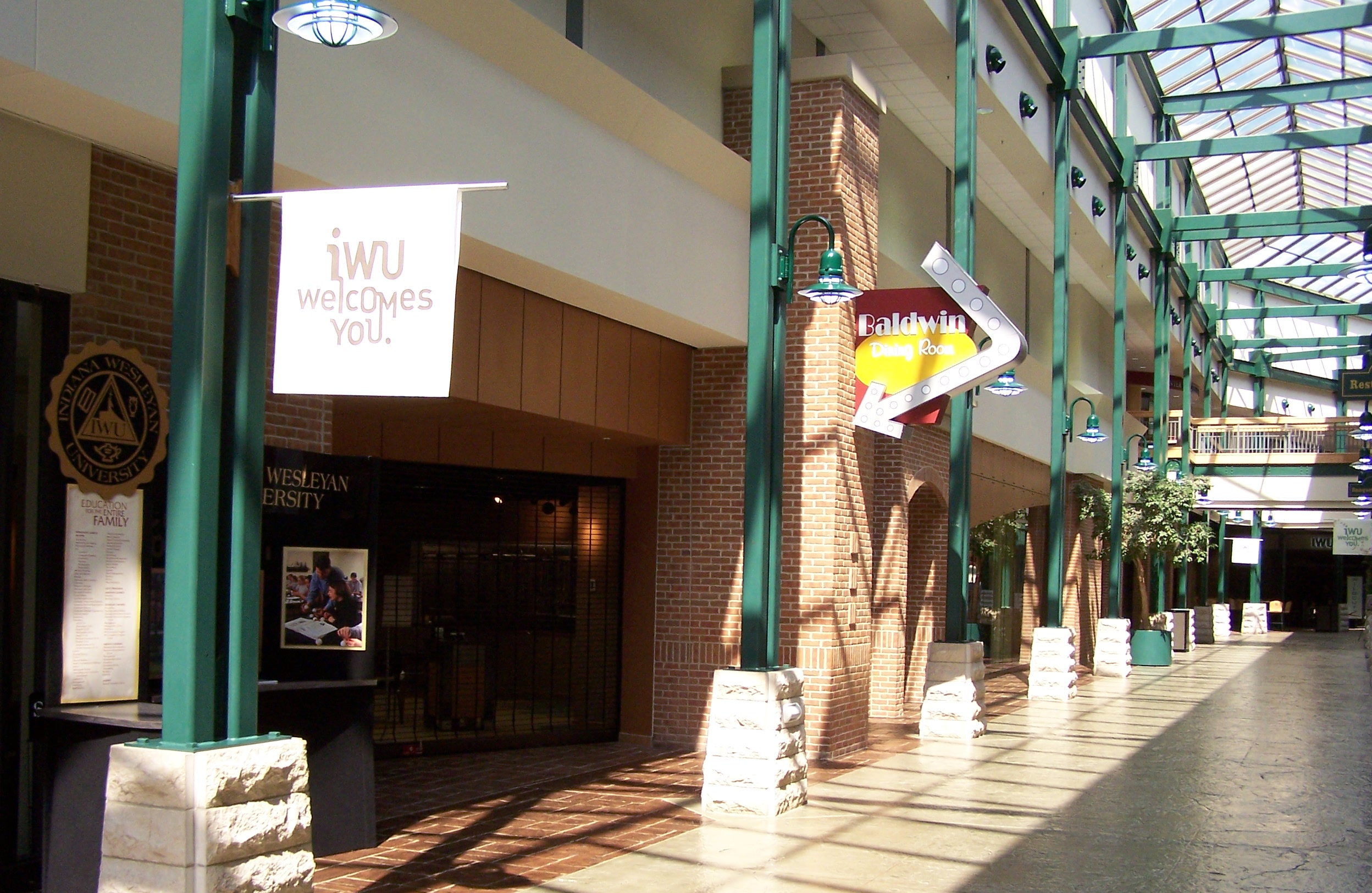
Barnes Student Center Mall (2006)

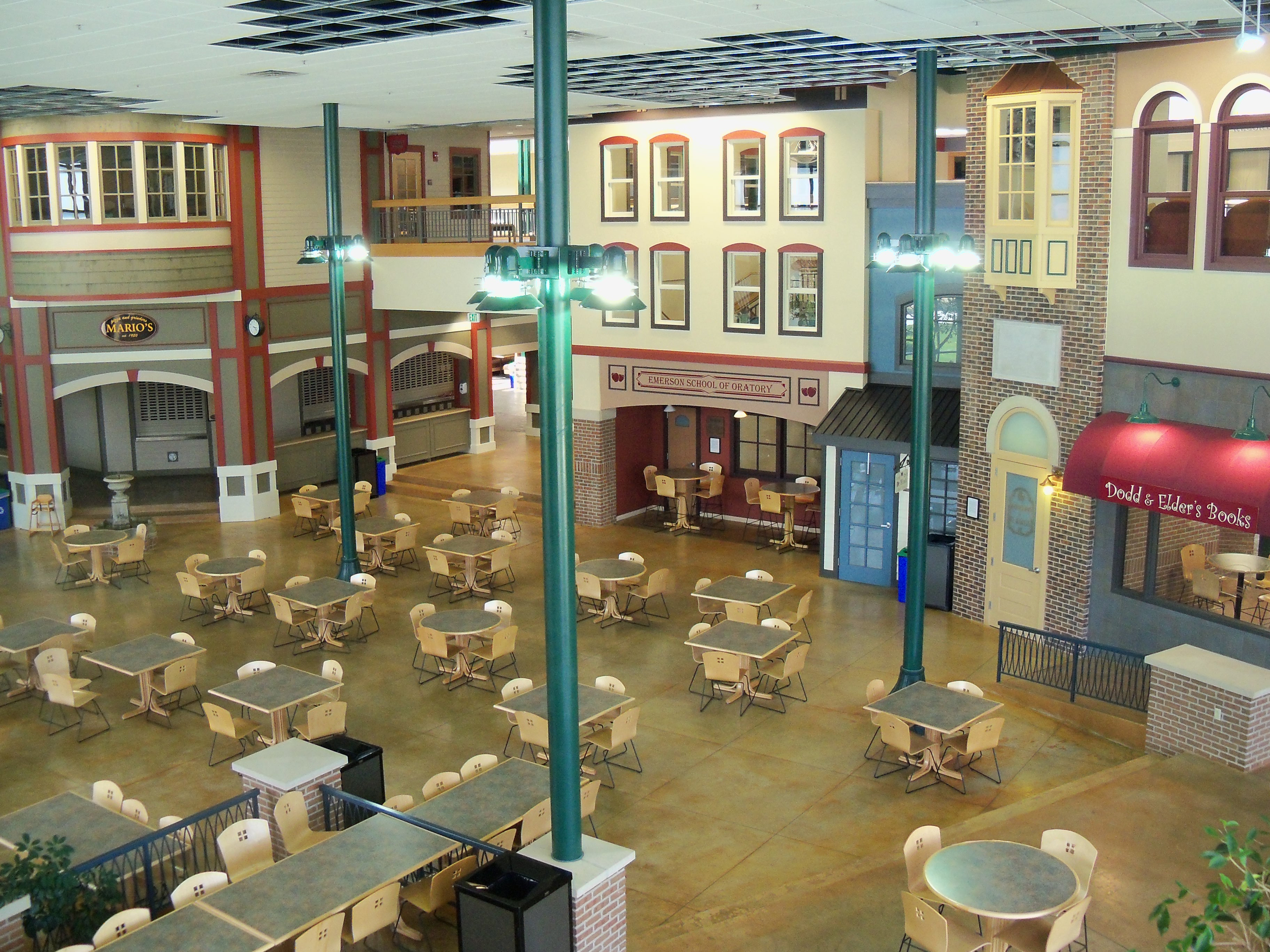
Barnes Student Center Piazza (2006)

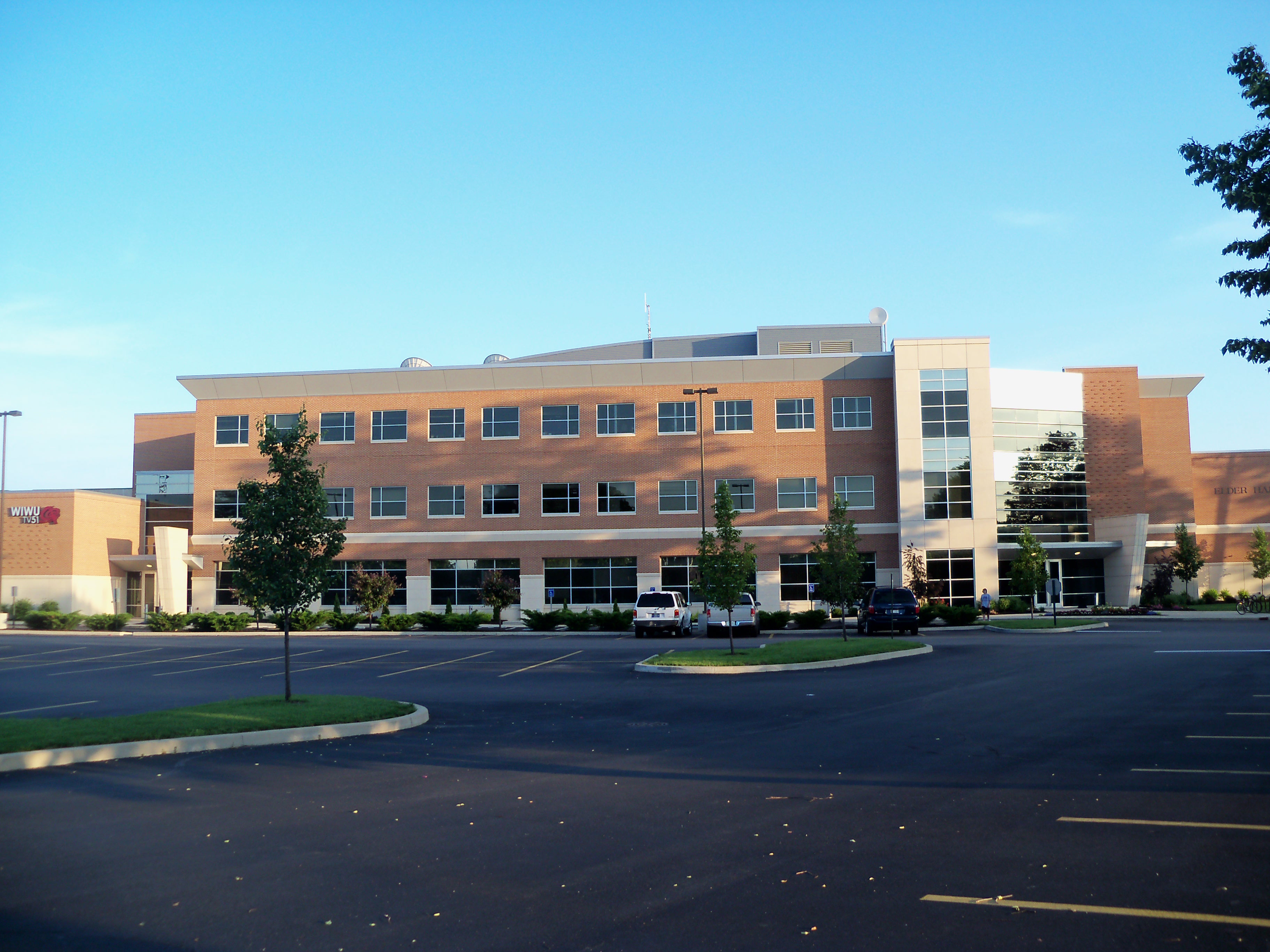
Elder Hall (2007)

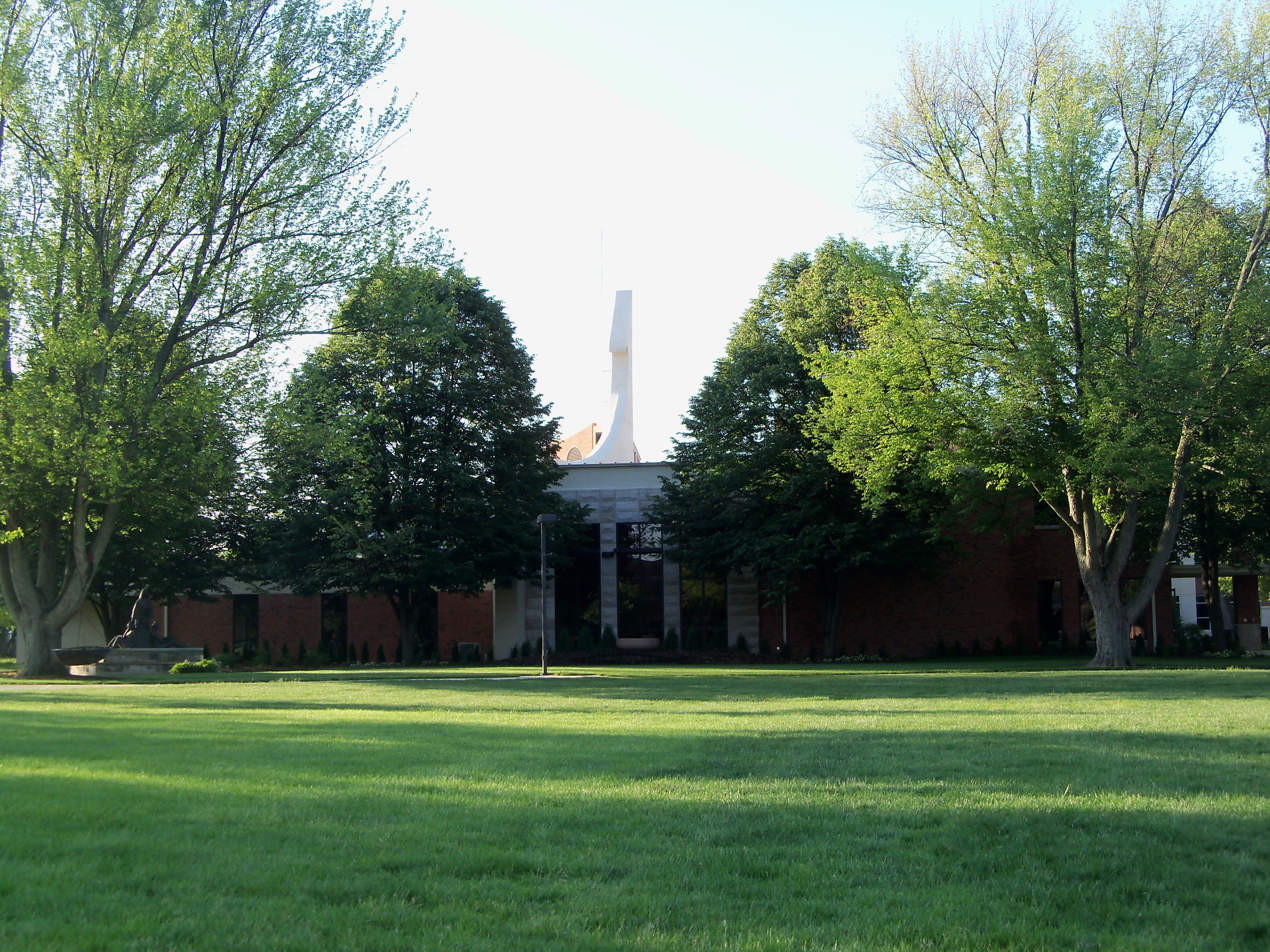
Noggle Christian Ministries Center (1986, 2008)

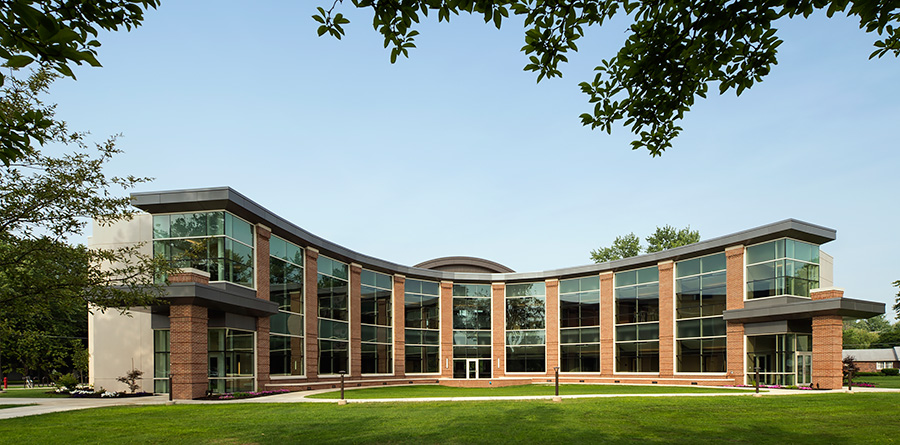
Welcome Center (2013, 2026)

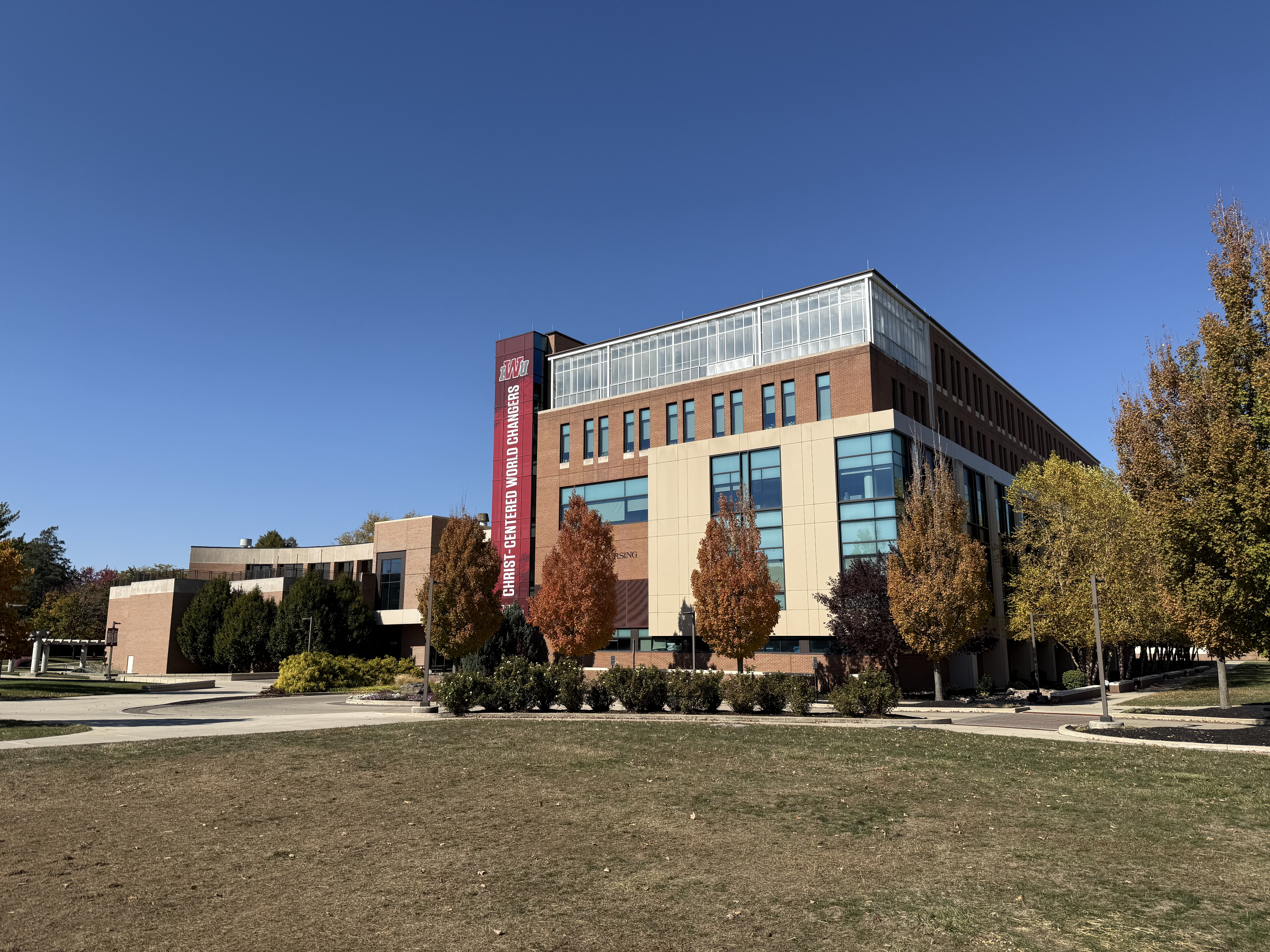
Ott Hall of Science and Nursing (2015)

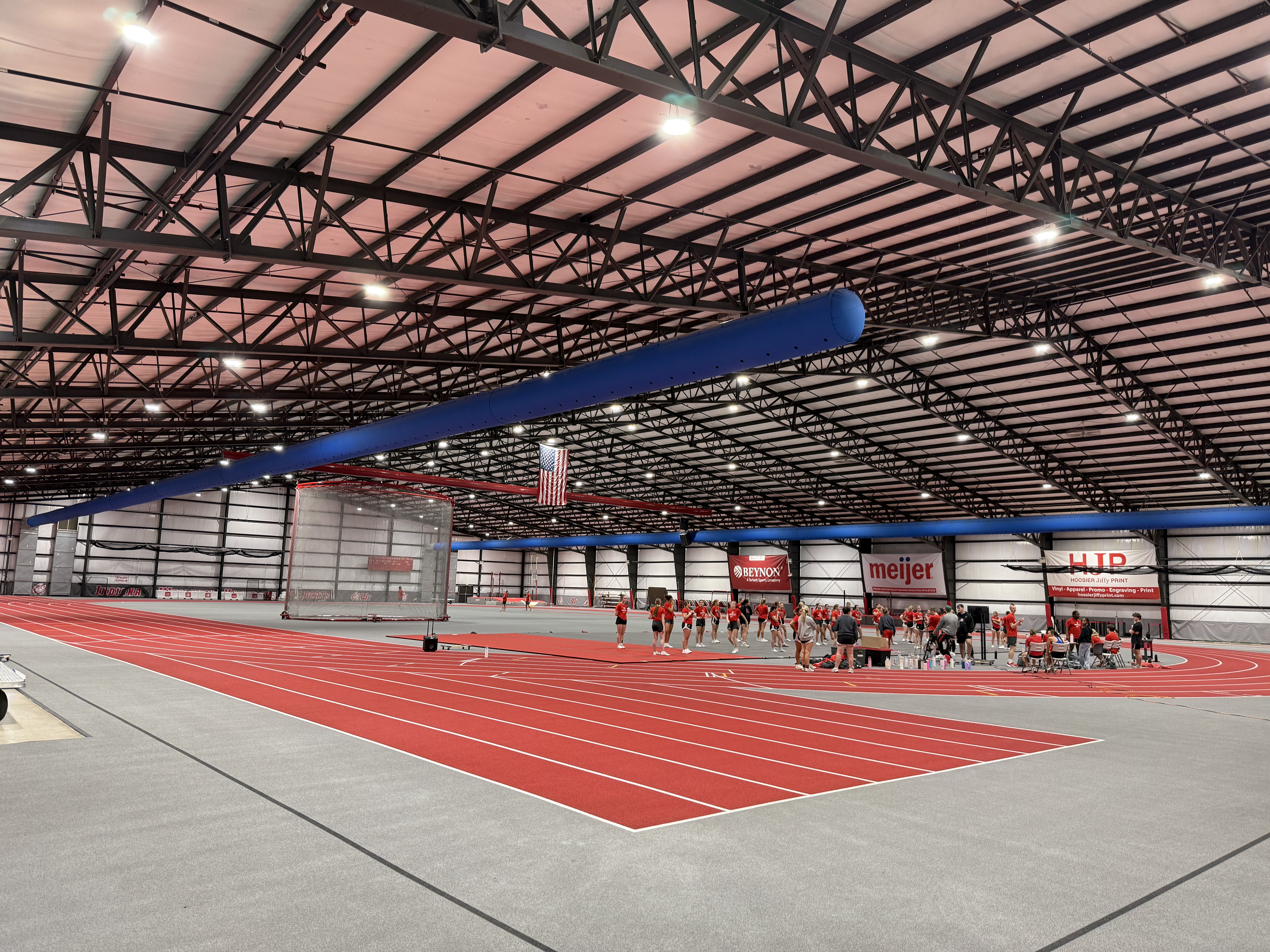
Troyer Fieldhouse (2007)

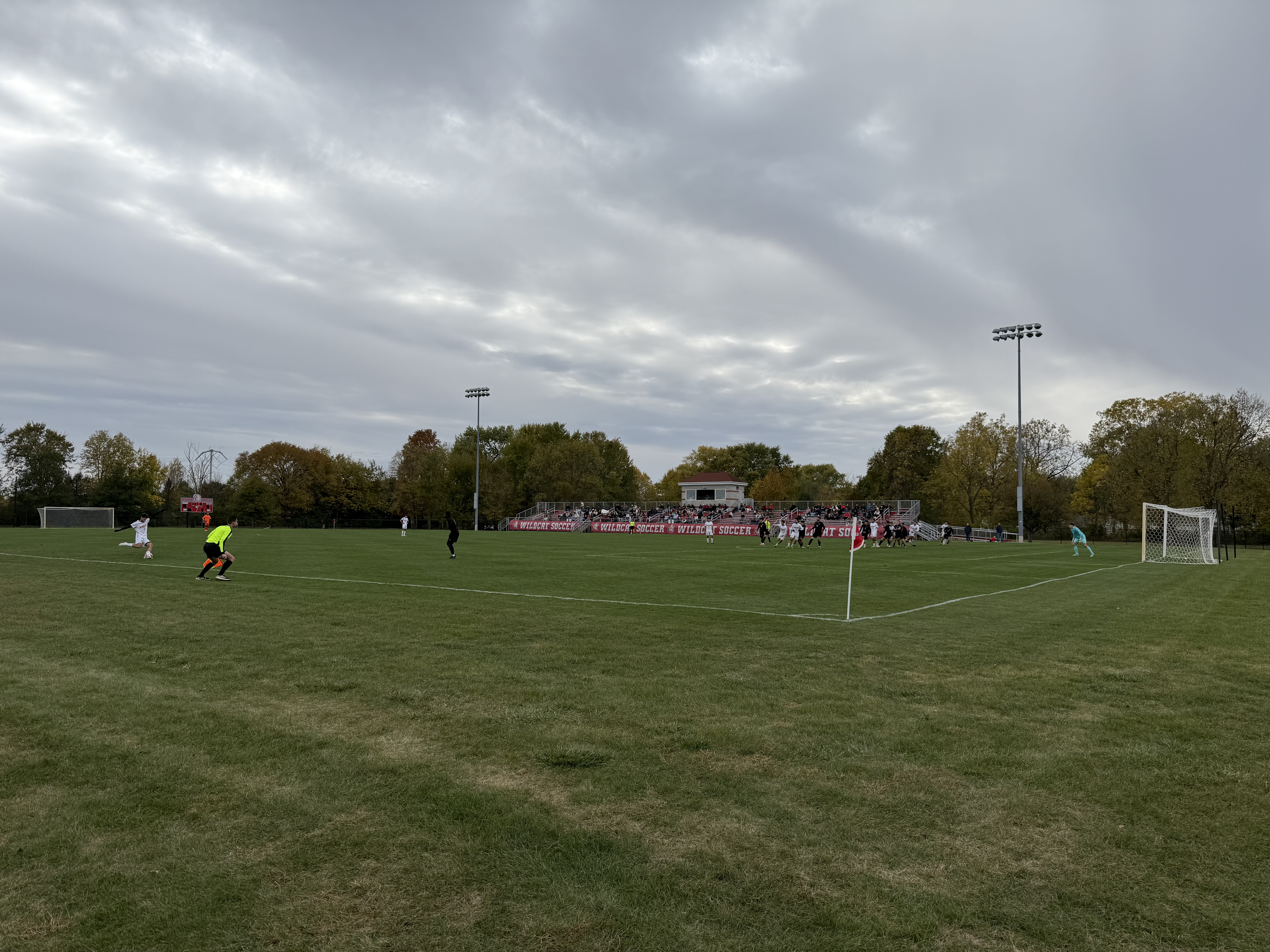
Wildcat Field (1994, 2008)

== Society of World Changers ==
IWU created the Society of World Changers in 2003 to recognize nationally renowned figures who have exemplified the concept of world changers (those who impact their secular sphere of influence for Christianity) and whose lives can serve as an inspiration to future generations. Each year a World Changers Convocation is held on IWU's Marion campus to induct a new member into the Society and celebrate his or her accomplishments. A life-size bronze bust of each inductee is placed on permanent display in the Society of World Changers Hall of Honor located in the rotunda of the Jackson Library.

== Music ==
The university's music department is most noted for its premier choir, the University Chorale. Throughout the year, the eighty voice ensemble regularly travels to many states, singing in churches across the country and performing before thousands of people each year. Most notably, the Chorale has performed several times at the internationally recognized Crystal Cathedral in Orange County, California and Coral Ridge Presbyterian Church in Fort Lauderdale, Florida. The group has also toured throughout Europe on several occasions, singing in venues such as St. Giles' Cathedral, Edinburgh, Scotland; St Michael and All Angels' Church, Haworth, England; York Minster, York, England; Christ Church Cathedral, Oxford, England; St Paul's Cathedral, London, England; Basilique du Sacré-Cœur, Paris, France; and St. Peter's Basilica, Vatican City. The choir is made up of students in a variety of majors. Auditions are held at the beginning of each school year as hundreds of students audition for the open spots. Other ensembles at the university include choirs and groups, along with the University Orchestra. These groups perform on campus and regionally on a regular basis. Throughout the school year, students also perform a wide variety of solo and joint recitals. The Phillippe Performing Arts Center is home to the IWU Music Department.

== Athletics ==
The Indiana Wesleyan (IWU) athletic teams are called the Wildcats. The university is a member of the National Association of Intercollegiate Athletics (NAIA), primarily competing in the Crossroads League (formerly known as the Mid-Central College Conference (MCCC) until after the 2011–12 school year) since the 1973–74 academic year; while its football team competes in the Mideast League of the Mid-States Football Association (MSFA) and its men's and women's swimming teams compete in the Mid-South Conference (MSC). They were also a member of the National Christian College Athletic Association (NCCAA), primarily competing as an independent in the Midwest Region of the Division I level.

IWU competes in 23 intercollegiate varsity sports: Men's sports include baseball, basketball, bowling, cross country, football, golf, soccer, swimming, tennis and track and field (indoor and outdoor). Women's sports include basketball, bowling, cross country, golf, soccer, softball, swimming, tennis, track and field (indoor and outdoor) and volleyball; and co-ed sports include competitive cheer.

=== Accomplishments ===
Indiana Wesleyan is the winningest school in Crossroads League history. IWU won the league Commissioners Cup a record twelve consecutive years, and placed among the Top 20 in the NAIA United States Sports Academy Directors' Cup Standings 13 straight years. The Women's Tennis Team has won the Crossroads League Conference Championship 31 years in a row. They have won more matches than any other tennis team in any division since 2014. The Men's Tennis Team won a record 41 matches in the 2021–22 season. No other tennis team at any level has won more than 39 matches in a given season. The university was awarded the 2008 NCCAA President's Cup as the best overall athletic program in the nation, and shared the award with Cedarville University in 2009, the fourth time IWU won the award.

=== Championships ===
Men's sports began Crossroads League play in 1968 and women's sports began league play in 1986. The university holds the record for Crossroads League championships with 180 titles as of 2021. The university has won 31 national championship titles, including 2 NAIA national championships from the record-setting 2006–2007 women's basketball team that went 38–0 and the 2012–2013 women's basketball team. IWU has won an additional 3 NAIA national championships in 2014, 2016 and 2018 in men's basketball. Katie Wilson and Lucia Solis won the 2015 ITA NAIA National Tennis Doubles Title. In 2023, they won the NAIA Women's Volleyball national title by going undefeated all season with a 38–0 seasonal score. In 2024, they won the national title again after an epic comeback in the final tie break against Bellevue from 8–14 to 16–14, sealing another triumphant season with a 34-win winning streak and a season score of 37–2. The other 26 titles are NCCAA national championships.

== Notable alumni ==
=== Alumni ===
- List of Indiana Wesleyan University alumni
