= Ushi Narrative Tablet =

Sumerian/cuneiform tablet

The Ushi Narrative Tablet, sometimes Ushi's Narrative Tablet, is a cuneiform tablet dated to around 3200BC and the Uruk III period of ancient Sumer, containing a narrative inscription attributed to a scribe by the name of "Ushi". It was discovered at some point during the German Oriental Society's excavations of Warka (Uruk) and surrounding areas between 1931 and 1939, and was subsequently sold as part of the illegal antiquities trade out of Iraq. The tablet was held by anonymous collectors until it was rediscovered by authorities as part of the Hobby Lobby smuggling scandal.

== Description and discovery ==
The tablet is made from clay, and is said to measure 10 cm tall, 5 cm wide, 2 cm thick, with several lines of legible cuneiform text, likely Sumero-Akkadian.

From 1928 to 1939 the German Oriental Society excavated at Warka, in the southern part of the modern state of Iraq. The tablet was described as part of a larger cache by Dr. Arnold Nöldeke, but no academic work on the tablet was ever conducted and the inscription remains untranslated.

The tablet's whereabouts between 1939 and 2017 are unknown, but it featured in the civil forfeiture case United States of America v. Approximately Four Hundred Fifty Ancient Cuneiform Tablets and Approximately Three Thousand Ancient Clay Bullae, as part of the larger trove recovered from Hobby Lobby Stores Inc., and the chain store's attempts to furnish its Museum of the Bible endeavor with genuine antiquities.
