= Blood antiquities =

Archaeological artefacts looted during conflict

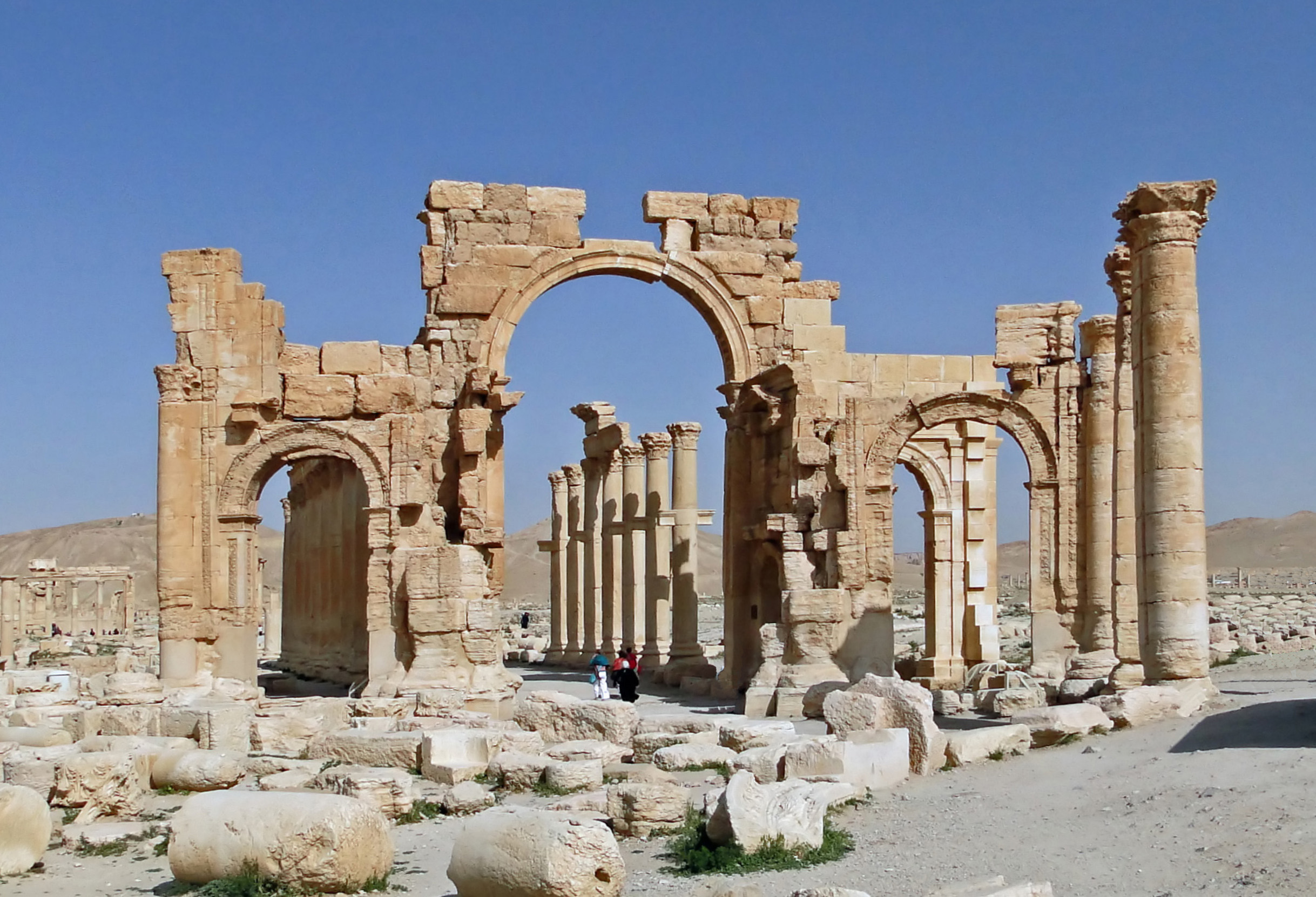
Photo of the (already destroyed) Monumental Arch of Palmyra, Syria. The Islamic State financed itself by looting this and other archaeological sites such as Mosul, Nineveh or Apamea, and selling the stolen pieces on black markets online.

Blood antiquities are archaeological artifacts that have been plundered from conflict zones, archaeological sites or museums and sold on black markets by criminal networks. The looting of archaeological sites and the illicit trafficking of cultural property is, and has been, a common practice for terrorist groups in war zones. The pieces end up on black markets, art galleries, antique shops and private collections in Europe and North America. The looting of blood antiquities is a global issue with developing countries and war zones being at the highest risk of cultural artefact theft.

== By country ==
=== Iraq ===
During the 2003 Invasion of Iraq, major robberies occurred at the National Museum of Iraq. Around 50,000 pieces were quantified equal to 25% of all the museum's heritage.

The Archaeological Institute of America estimates that the revenue from looted antiquities is between $ 10 and $ 20 million annually. Terrorist and rebel groups such as the Islamic State (ISIS) have a long history of using stolen artifacts to finance their operations. Islamic State leaders have justified their looting and destruction of pre-Islamic artefacts by stating that they are idolatrous, but have been accused of doing so for profit.

=== Syria ===
During the Syrian Civil War, the Islamic State (ISIS) carried out the systematic looting of historical sites as their main form of profit. It is estimated that ISIS has occupied around 4,500 sites and that the income derived from the antiquities trade amounts to 100,000,000 USD annually. The terrorist organization has an internal institution dedicated to this illegal trade.

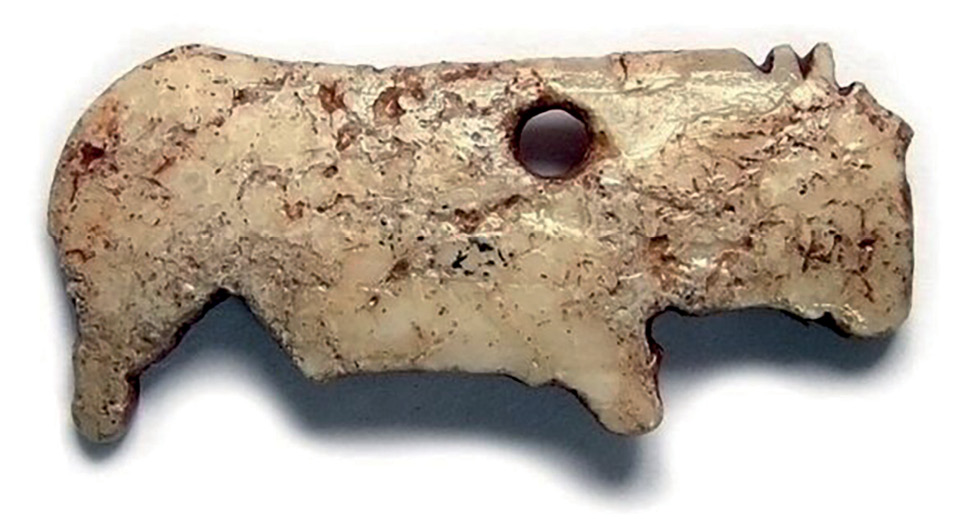
The Mariupol Bull Figurine, a carved bone figurine of a bull ca. 6000 BCE, was housed in the Mariupol Museum of Local Lore in Mariupol, Ukraine. Its location has been unknown since the 2022 Siege of Mariupol by Russian Armed Forces.

=== Ukraine ===
Since the start of the Russo-Ukrainian War in 2014 and the subsequent Russian occupation of Crimea in 2022, official estimates of 1.7 million artifacts belonging to Ukraine, such as the Mariupol Bull Figurine, have been taken from Ukrainian museums and archaeological, cultural, and heritage sites. The removal of these artifacts has been characterized by organizations such as the Antiquities Coalition as a way to illicitly profit off of Ukraine's loss of cultural identity.

=== Yemen ===
In Yemen, blood antiquities have been used to finance the Yemeni Civil War, which the country has been fighting since 2014. The Antiquities Coalition (AC) published a report in 2019 in which it is estimated that, in the country's museums alone, 1,631 historical objects have disappeared. The museums affected are the Aden National Museum, the Taiz National Museum and the Zinjibar National Museum; this number does not include archaeological sites like Shabwa. The illicit trafficking of these pieces is one of the main forms of financing for terrorist groups such as Al-Qaeda in the Arabian Peninsula (AQAP) and the Houthi movement.

== Impact ==
=== The Hobby Lobby Scandal ===
Hobby Lobby began collecting antiquities in 2009, purchasing over 5,500 artifacts in December 2010 for $1.6 million despite being warned by a cultural property expert that Iraqi artifacts are likely to have been looted and improper disclosure of imports could lead to seizure.

Despite warnings, Hobby Lobby proceeded to smuggle the artifacts into the United States through the United Arab Emirates and Israel, falsely labeling the packages as "tile samples" on shipping documentation.

The U.S. government filed a legal case against Hobby Lobby after determining the artifacts were brought into the U.S. in violation of customs and property laws and in 2017, Hobby Lobby agreed to forfeit the artifacts and pay a $3 million settlement. In May of 2018, 3,800 of the artifacts were returned to Iraq by Immigration and Customs Enforcement.

=== The Coffin of Nedjemankh ===
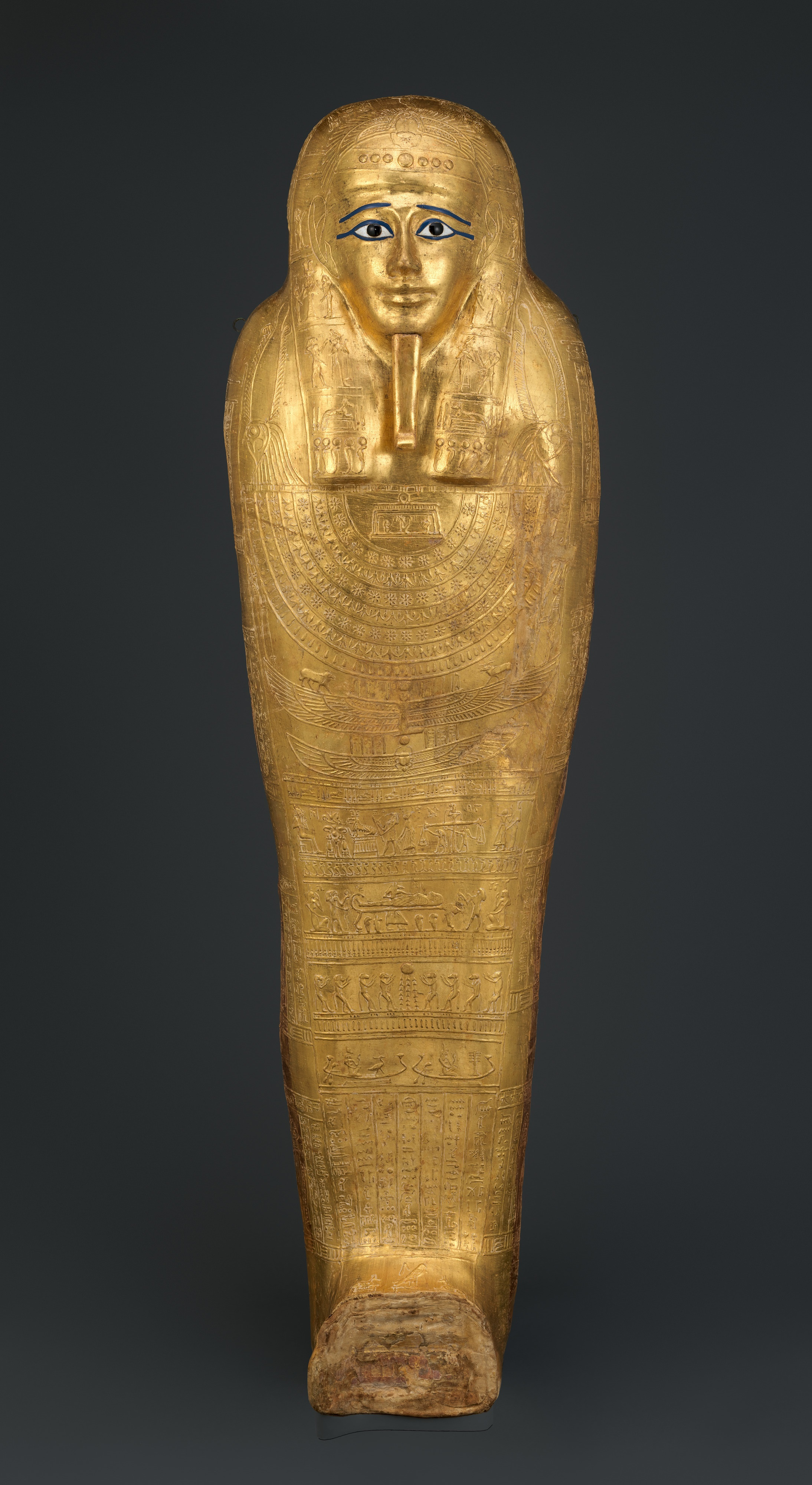
The lid of Nedjemankh's coffin.

In 2019, the Metropolitan Museum of Art repatriated the Coffin of Nedjemankh to Egypt after discovering that the coffin was looted in 2011. As a result of this incident, the Metropolitan Museum of Art committed to review and improve its acquisition processes.
