= Candida Moss =

British bible scholar

Candida R. Moss FRHistS
- Born: 26 November 1978 (age 47); London, England
- Title: Edward Cadbury Professor of Theology
- Spouse: Justin Foa (m. 2018)
- Awards: American Academy of Arts and Sciences and Grawemeyer Award

Academic background
- Education: Worcester College, Oxford; Yale Divinity School; Yale University
- Doctoral advisor: Adela Yarbro Collins

Academic work
- Discipline: Biblical studies
- Sub-discipline: New Testament; Early Christianity; Martyrdom
- Institutions: University of Birmingham; Institute for the Study of the Ancient World

Candida R. Moss FRHistS (born 26 November 1978) is a British journalist, New Testament scholar and historian of Christianity, and as of 2017, the Edward Cadbury Professor of Theology in the Department of Theology and Religion at the University of Birmingham. Moss specialises in the study of the New Testament, with a focus on the subject of martyrdom in early Christianity, as well as other topics from the New Testament and early church history.

She is the winner of a number of awards for her research and writing, including the 2026 Grawemeyer Award in Religion and is a member of the American Academy of Arts and Sciences.

== Early life and education ==
Moss was born on 26 November 1978 in London, England. She is the daughter of journalist, political speech writer, and author Robert Moss. Moss's mother, Katrina Elizabeth Wise, died in 2005.

She graduated from Oxford University in 2000 with a BA in theology, a degree taken with Honors at Worcester College. In 2002, she received a Master of Arts in Religion (MAR) in Biblical studies from Yale Divinity School. Moss graduated from Yale University in 2006 with an MA and an MPhil in New Testament, following this by a PhD in the same field in 2008. Her doctoral advisor was Adela Yarbro Collins.

== Career ==
=== Appointments ===
Moss began her career at the University of Notre Dame in South Bend, Indiana, and became a full professor there in 2012, four years after receiving her PhD from Yale. As of August 2017, Moss had joined the faculty of the Department of Theology and Religion at the University of Birmingham as Edward Cadbury Professor of Theology. In 2025 Moss became the General Editor of the Yale Anchor Bible Series. She is also a research associate at the Institute for the Study of the Ancient World at New York University.

=== Research ===
Moss has specialized in the study of martyrdom, ancient medicine and the New Testament, early Christian ideas about the resurrection of Jesus's physical body, and enslaved literate workers in the ancient world.

Moss has written three books on martyrdom. Her writing on this subject has been praised for its "readability, clarity...creativity, thoughtfulness, and wit." She was the recipient of the John Templeton Award of Theological Promise in 2011, which cited her 2010 OUP book, The Other Christs: Imitating Jesus in Ancient Christian Ideologies of Martyrdom. Her 2012 book, Ancient Christian Martyrdom, argued that post-Enlightenment bias against martyrdom had led scholars to think of martyrdom as a phenomenon that spread from one region of the Roman empire to another; against this, Moss argues that martyrdom developed differently in different contexts. Her controversial 2013 book, The Myth of Persecution: How Early Christians Invented a Story of Martyrdom, argues that the stories of early Christian martyrdom "have been altered ... edited and shaped by later generations of Christians" and none of them are "completely historically accurate"; she additionally maintains that the Roman authorities did not actively seek out or target Christians and that in the first three centuries of Christian history, Christians were only prosecuted by order of a Roman emperor for a brief period (no more than twelve years). In a review published in 2013 focusing on her first two books, Edinburgh classicist Lucy Grig wrote that "Candida Moss has swiftly established herself as one of the most interesting and original scholars working on early Christian martyrdom." However, The Myth of Persecution has received negative reviews from Christian scholars who question both the methodology and the conclusions of the book.

Moss is one of the first scholars to study the role and relevance of disability and ancient medicine in the New Testament. In 2011 she co-edited Disability Studies and Biblical Studies with Jeremy Schipper and, in 2015, co-authored Reconciling Infertility: Biblical Perspectives on Procreation and Childlessness with Yale Divinity School professor of Hebrew Bible Joel Baden. The latter was shortlisted by the American Academy of Religion for its Book Prize for Textual Studies. Her 2019 book Divine Bodies: Resurrecting Perfection in the New Testament and Early Christianity argued that disability might be preserved in the resurrection.

In 2017, Moss and Baden collaborated on a second book on Bible Nation: The United States of Hobby Lobby, which examined the efforts of the Green family, the owners of Hobby Lobby to influence religion and politics in America. The book grew out of their role exposing antiquities trafficking and the Hobby Lobby smuggling scandal. The New Republic described the book as "Exhaustively reported and scrupulously fair". The Washington Post called it a "remarkable fusion of biblical studies and investigative journalism." It was named one of Publishers Weekly's 2017 Best Books in Religion.

==== God's Ghostwriters (2024) ====
In 2024, Moss published God's Ghostwriters: Enslaved Christians and the Making of the Bible with Little, Brown and Company. The focus of this work is on Slavery in Ancient Rome and the ways in which enslaved secretaries, scribes, readers, and copyists contributed to the writing of the New Testament and the dissemination of early Christianity. The work was based on a number of previously published peer-reviewed articles in the Studies in Late Antiquity, the Journal of Theological Studies, and New Testament Studies, receiving widespread attention as a paradigm-shifting work. The Irish Independent called it ""A tour de force" and "an intellectual triumph."

The Spectator wrote that Moss's "massive achievement is to shift the paradigm and tell the early Christian story (as far as is possible) from the perspective of the enslaved."

The New York Times Book Review concluded that the book made "it impossible to ignore the labor between the lines.”

The Wall Street Journal described it as "by far the best account we have of the roles by enslaved people in supporting the high literary culture of the ancient world more broadly." It added that "No one can possibly doubt, after reading this vigorous and provocative book, that the whole texture of Christian thought would have looked very different without them." At the same time, some reviewers took issue with Moss's use of Saidiya Hartman's methods of critical fabulation and criticized the speculative nature of some of her arguments. The book was distinctive as the first work of ancient history written for the general public to be published with a companion website containing thousands of additional endnotes and references.

In his 2024 endorsement for God's Ghostwriters, New York Times bestselling-author Reza Aslan described Moss as "the most compelling voice in Biblical Scholarship".

On his blog Variant Readings, Manuscript expert Brent Nongbri described it as "probably the most important book in New Testament studies written in the last half century."

The book received the 2026 Grawemeyer Award in Religion.

=== Public scholarship and journalism ===
Moss is a columnist for National Geographic and was previously a columnist for The Daily Beast. She has written for the Los Angeles Times, Politico, The New York Times, BBC Online, TIME, CNN.com, The Washington Post, HuffPost, The Chronicle of Higher Education,America and the Times Higher Education Supplement.

In January 2015, Moss and her coauthor Joel Baden were the first to reveal the Hobby Lobby smuggling scandal to the public when they wrote about the company's import of illicitly obtained cuneiform tablets for the Daily Beast.

Moss has served as papal news contributor for CBS News, and contributed to the BBC Radio 4's In Our Time. She was an academic consultant to the television series The Bible, and an on-air expert and host for National Geographic Explorer, as well as for the History, Travel, and Smithsonian Channels.

Moss is an advocate for public academic scholarship. In a 2022 article for data-based website Academic Influence, Moss topped the list of the ten most influential women in religious studies in that last ten years. Following a unanimous recommendation from their Outreach Prizes Committee, the Society for Classical Studies awarded Moss the 2024 Mary-Kay Gamel Public Outreach Award for her public scholarship. In 2025 she was awarded the Richards Award for Public Scholarship from the Society of Biblical Literature.

== Honors ==
Awards

- 2000-02 Marquand Scholar, Yale Divinity School
- 2006 Catholic Biblical Association Memorial Stipend
- 2007 Charlotte W. Newcombe Doctoral Dissertation Fellowship, Woodrow Wilson National Fellowship Foundation
- 2010 NEH Summer Seminar Grant from the National Endowment for the Humanities.
- 2011 John Templeton Award for Theological Promise for The Other Christs: Imitating Jesus in Ancient Christian Ideologies of Martyrdom.
- 2013 Elected a member of Studiorum Novi Testamenti Societas.
- 2017 Co-authored book Bible Nation: The United States of Hobby Lobby was selected as a Publishers Weekly 2017 Best Book in Religion.
- 2023 Received a grant from the Catholic Biblical Association for a project on "Enslaved Literate Workers and Christian Book Culture."
- 2023 Her jointly-organized project "Beyond the Codex: The Invention of the Christian Book" received a grant from the British Academy.
- 2023 Moss was named a recipient of the Status of Women in the Profession Mentor Award from the Society of Biblical Literature
- 2024 Elected an International Honorary Member of the American Academy of Arts and Sciences
- 2024 Elected a Fellow of the Royal Historical Society.
- 2024 Mary-Kay Gamel Outreach prize, Society for Classical Studies.
- 2025 Nautilus Book Awards Silver Medal.
- 2025 Richards Award for Public Scholarship, Society of Biblical Literature
- 2026 Grawemeyer Award in Religion.

Endowed Lectures

- Colliver Lecture, University of the Pacific. Stockton, Calif., September 19, 2013.
- 51st Institute on Sacred Scripture, Catholic University of America, June 10–12, 2014.
- 34th Annual Newell Lectures in Biblical Studies, Anderson School of Theology, October 12, 2015.
- 6th Irene E. Marold Lectures, Moravian Seminary, Bethlehem Pennsylvania, October 23, 2015.
- E. P. Adler lecture, University of Iowa, March 3, 2016.
- Cadbury Lectures, University of Birmingham, UK March 6–10, 2017.
- Inaugural Wolfe Lecture, Boston College, February 7, 2018.
- 26th Distinguished Lecture, East Carolina University, September 27, 2018.
- G. Peter Kaye Lecture, Vancouver School of Theology, February 21, 2020.
- Dean's Lecture Series, Saint John's Cathedral, Denver, April 27, 2022.
- Killeen Chair Lecture Series, St. Norbert College, 21 September 2023.
- James A Kirk Lecture, University of Denver, 24 April 2024.
- Lattey Lecture, University of Cambridge, May 28, 2024.

== Personal life ==
Moss is a kidney transplant recipient. She is a Roman Catholic.

In April 2018, she married Justin Foa, the president and CEO of Foa & Son, an international insurance brokerage firm established in 1861. Moss's brother-in-law is Barrett Foa, a singer, dancer, and actor who portrayed Eric Beale on the military police procedural NCIS: Los Angeles. Moss has two stepsons, Max and Luke. In an article published on Mother's Day 2022 Moss said of them that she "did not think anyone could love any child more than I love the boys."

== Selected works ==
=== Thesis ===
- Moss, Candida (2008). Gods, Lords and Kings: the characterization of the martyrs in the early Christian Acta Martyrum (PhD). Yale University. OCLC 272271965.

=== Books ===
- Moss, Candida (2010). The Other Christs: Imitating Jesus in Ancient Christian Ideologies of Martyrdom. Oxford & New York: Oxford University Press. ISBN 9780199739875.
- ——— (2012). Ancient Christian Martyrdom: Diverse Practices, Ideologies, and Traditions. Anchor Yale Bible Reference Library. New Haven, CT: Yale University Press. ISBN 9780300154658.
- ——— (2013). The Myth of Persecution: How Early Christians Invented a Story of Martyrdom. New York: HarperOne. ISBN 978-0-06-210452-6.
- ———; Baden, Joel (2015). Reconceiving Infertility: Biblical Perspectives on Procreation and Childlessness. Princeton, NJ: Princeton University Press. ISBN 978-0691164830.
- ———; Baden, Joel (2017). Bible Nation: The United States of Hobby Lobby. Princeton, NJ: Princeton University Press. ISBN 9780691177359.
- ——— (2019). Divine Bodies: Resurrecting Perfection in the New Testament and Early Christianity. New Haven, Conn: Yale University Press. ISBN 9780300179767.
- ——— (2024). God's Ghostwriters: Enslaved Christians and the Making of the Bible. New York: Little, Brown. ISBN 9780316564670.

=== Edited volumes ===
- ———; Schipper, Jeremy, eds. (2011). Disability Studies and Biblical Literature. New York: Palgrave Macmillan. ISBN 9780230338296.
- ———; Nicklas, Tobias; Verheyden, Joseph; Tuckett, Christopher M., eds. (2017). The Other Side: Apocryphal Perspectives on Ancient Christian "Orthodoxies". Göttingen: Vandenhoeck & Ruprecht. ISBN 9783525540589.
- ———; Coogan, Jeremiah; Howley, Joseph, eds. (2025). Writing, Enslavement and Power in the Roman Mediterranean, 100 BCE-300 CE. Oxford: Oxford University Press. ISBN 9780197769966.

=== Peer-reviewed journal articles ===
- "The Secretary: Enslaved Workers, Stenography, and the Production of Early Christian Literature," The Journal of Theological Studies 74 (2023): 20-56.
- Co-authored with Meghan R. Henning. "Pulling Apart and Piecing Together: Wholeness and Fragnentation in Early Christian Visions of the Afterlife," Journal of the American Academy of Religion 90 (2022):973-986.
- "Reading Between the Lines: Looking for the Contributions of Enslaved Literate Laborers in a Second Century Text," Studies in Late Antiquity 5 (2021): 432–52
- "Infant Exposure and the Rhetoric of Cannibalism, Incest, and Martyrdom in the Early Church," Journal of Early Christian Studies 29:3 (2021): 341-396.
- "Fashioning Mark: Early Christian Discussions about the Scribe and Status of the Second Gospel,” New Testament Studies 67:2 (2021): 181-204.
- Co-authored with Liane M. Feldman. "The New Jerusalem: Wealth, Ancient Building Projects, and Revelation 21-22,” New Testament Studies 66:3 (2020): 351-66.
- “Dying to Live Forever: Identity and Virtue in the Resurrection of the Bodies of the Martyrs,” Irish Theological Quarterly 84:2 (2019): 155-174.
- "A Note on the Death of Judas in Papias,” New Testament Studies 65:3 (2019): 388-97.
- "The Marks of the Nails: Scars, Wounds, and the Resurrection of Jesus in John,” Early Christianity 8:1 (2017): 48–68
- "Nailing Down and Tying Up: Lessons in Intertextual Impossibility from the Martyrdom of Polycarp,” Vigiliae Christianae 67:2 (2013): 117-136.
- “Christly Possession and Weakened Bodies: A Reconsideration of the Function of Paul's Thorn in the Flesh (2 Cor. 12:7-10),” Journal of Religion Disability and Health 16:4 (2012): 319-333.
- “The Discourse of Voluntary Martyrdom: Ancient and Modern,” Church History 81:3 (2012): 531-551.
- Co-Authopred with Jeffrey Stackert “The Devastation of Darkness: Disability in Exodus 10:21-23, 27, and the Intensification of the Plagues,” Journal of Religion 92:3 (2012): 362-372.
- Co-authored with Joel S. Baden. “1 Thess 4:13-18 in Rabbinic Perspective,” New Testament Studies 58 (2012): 1-16.
- “Blurred Vision and Ethical Confusion: The Rhetorical Function of Matt 6:22-23,” Catholic Biblical Quarterly 73:4 (2011): 757-76.
- Co-authored with Joel S. Baden. “The Origin and Interpretation of sara ‘at in Leviticus 13-14,” Journal of Biblical Literature 130:4 (2011): 643-661.
- “Heavenly Healing: Eschatological Cleansing and the Resurrection of the Dead in the Early Church,” Journal of the American Academy of Religion 79:3 (2011) 1-27.
- “The Man with the Flow of Power: Porous Bodies in Mark 5:25-34,” Journal of Biblical Literature 129:3 (2010): 507-519.
- “On the Dating of Polycarp: Rethinking the Place of the Martyrdom of Polycarp in the History of Christianity,” Early Christianity 1:4 (2010): 539-574.
- “The Transfiguration: An Exercise in Markan Accommodation,” Biblical Interpretation 12:4(2004): 69-89.

== See also ==
- Adela Yarbro Collins
- Barrett Foa
- Robert Moss
