= Hobby Lobby smuggling scandal =

Mesopotamian artifact scandal

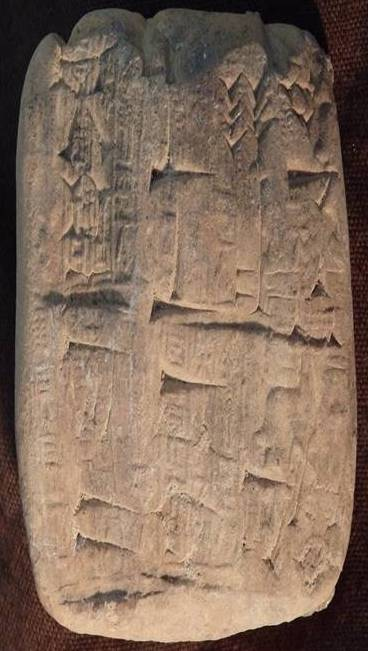
One of the ancient clay tablets bought by Hobby Lobby shows cuneiform script.

The Hobby Lobby smuggling scandal started in 2009 when representatives of the Hobby Lobby chain of craft stores received a large number of clay bullae and tablets originating in the ancient Near East. The artifacts were intended for the Museum of the Bible, funded by the Evangelical Christian Green family, which owns the Hobby Lobby chain. Internal staff had warned superiors that the items had dubious provenance and were potentially looted from Iraq.

Several shipments of the artifacts were seized by US customs agents in 2011, triggering a struggle between Hobby Lobby and the federal government that had in a 2017 civil forfeiture case United States of America v. Approximately Four Hundred Fifty Ancient Cuneiform Tablets and Approximately Three Thousand Ancient Clay Bullae. As a result of the case, Hobby Lobby agreed to return the artifacts and forfeit $3 million. US Immigration and Customs Enforcement returned 3,800 items seized from Hobby Lobby to Iraq in May 2018. In March 2020, Hobby Lobby president Steve Green agreed to return 11,500 items to Egypt and Iraq.

== Purchase and provenance ==
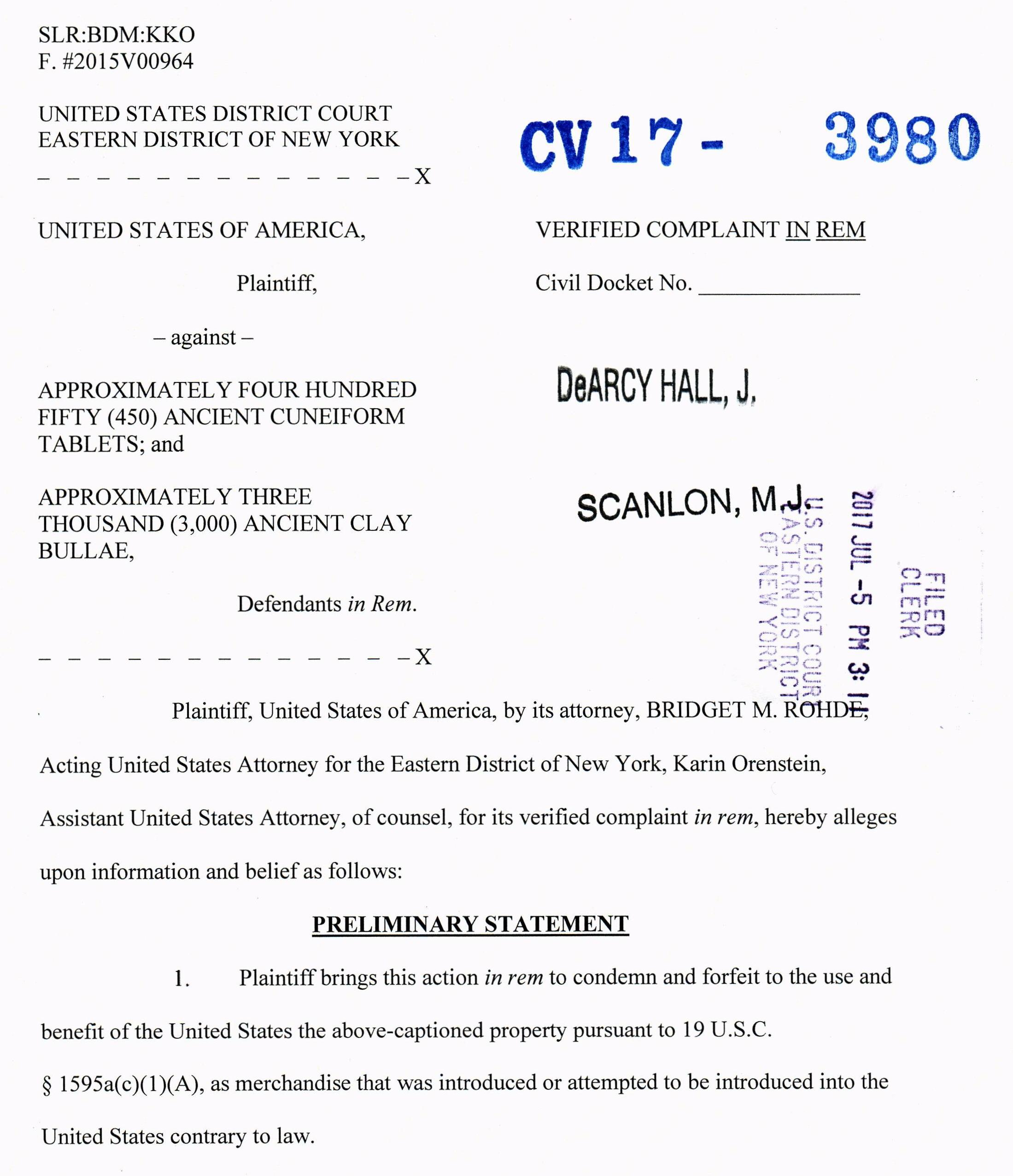
United States versus Approximately 450 Ancient Cuneiform Tablets is a court filing from July 2017.

In December 2010, Hobby Lobby purchased $1.6 million worth of Iraqi artifacts from dealers in the United Arab Emirates. The artifacts were largely cuneiform tablets, clay bullae, and cylinder seals, with some likely originating from the ancient city of Irisaĝrig on the Tigris. Many of the artifacts lacked any supporting evidence of their history or ownership, raising the possibility that the artifacts had been possibly looted or sold on the black market. The U.S. government investigated the company for these actions.

Archaeologists say some items may have come from the National Museum of Iraq, which had been looted after the American invasion of Iraq in 2003. Hobby Lobby made mass purchases with few pieces of vague documentation and scant descriptions, and "having commissioned inexperienced scholars to analyze ancient texts" according to scholars Candida Moss and Joel Baden in the book Bible Nation. The Museum of the Bible's chief curator in 2017 summarised: "We can't even tell sometimes which particular item belonged to which acquisition, because it just wasn't documented either at the acquisition point or at the delivery point. ... So we have no way of knowing where these came from."

Through the 2000s, the entire antiquities market had been widely and publicly warned of the proliferation of fakes, all manufactured with the same cheap flaws that are obvious to expert analysts. Further, Jodi Magness, president of the Archaeological Institute of America warns against such purchases: "Many [unprovenanced] antiquities surely come from illegal excavations or looting of archaeological sites".

== Importation, seizure, and litigation ==
When the cuneiform tablets were shipped to the United States, they were misrepresented on declarations as being ceramic and clay tile samples, and contained false designations of origin stating that the objects were from Turkey and Israel. US Immigrations and Customs Enforcement seized the shipments.

In early July 2017, US federal prosecutors filed a civil complaint in the Eastern District of New York under the case name United States of America v. Approximately Four Hundred Fifty Ancient Cuneiform Tablets and Approximately Three Thousand Ancient Clay Bullae. The Justice Department wrote that:

In October 2010, an expert on cultural property law retained by Hobby Lobby warned the company that the acquisition of cultural property likely from Iraq, including cuneiform tablets and cylinder seals, carries a risk that such objects may have been looted from archaeological sites in Iraq. The expert also advised Hobby Lobby to review its collection of antiquities for any objects of Iraqi origin and to verify that their country of origin was properly declared at the time of importation into the United States. The expert warned Hobby Lobby that an improper declaration of country of origin for cultural property could lead to seizure and forfeiture of the artifacts by CBP.

On July 5, 2017, Hobby Lobby consented to a settlement requiring forfeiture of the artifacts and payment of a fine of $3 million and the return of more than 5500 artifacts.

In the early hours of July 30, 2017, Israeli authorities raided several private residences and storefronts in Jerusalem belonging to five antiquities dealers of Palestinian origin and confiscated several historical artifacts, including a papyrus fragment from the Egyptian Book of the Dead and a Pompeiian fresco, and more than US$200,000 in cash. The Israeli Antiquities Authority had been contacted in 2016 by the United States Department of Homeland Security, and provided Israeli authorities with evidence of money transfers between Green and Israeli-licensed antiquities dealers. In all, five individuals were arrested for tax evasion. Candida Moss and Joel Baden in the book Bible Nation: The United States of Hobby Lobby report that the Green family's philanthropic activities—including antiquities donations to its own museum—have always followed a set ratio of 3:1, of the appraised value to the purchase price. This is reportedly with the goal of a large profit margin by way of tax write-off, wherein "the government is effectively paying the Greens to amass a collection of dubious antiquities".

== Retrospective ==
The 2019 book Tablets From the Irisaĝrig Archive mentions the scandal in its analysis of more than one thousand cuneiform tablets, possibly stolen from Irisaĝrig, a 4,000-year-old lost city in Iraq. The tablets, purchased by Hobby Lobby, were studied over a four-year period while in the company's Oklahoma storerooms. "The new find shows that the company Hobby Lobby — whose co-owner, Steve Green, helped found the Museum of the Bible in November 2017 in Washington, D.C. — had far more cuneiform tablets obtained (possibly illegally) from this city, and other sites in Iraq, than previously believed." Up to 1,400 artifacts to be returned to Iraq appear to be missing from the Hobby Lobby collection.

== Collections management controversy ==
=== Counterfeit items ===
In October 2018, the Museum of the Bible revealed that five of its sixteen Dead Sea Scrolls fragments are counterfeit. In March 2020, independent art fraud investigators hired by the museum revealed that all sixteen fragments are counterfeit, made from ancient leather and modern inks.

The museum removed the display of another disputed artifact, a miniature bible which a NASA astronaut had purportedly carried to the moon.

=== Stolen items ===
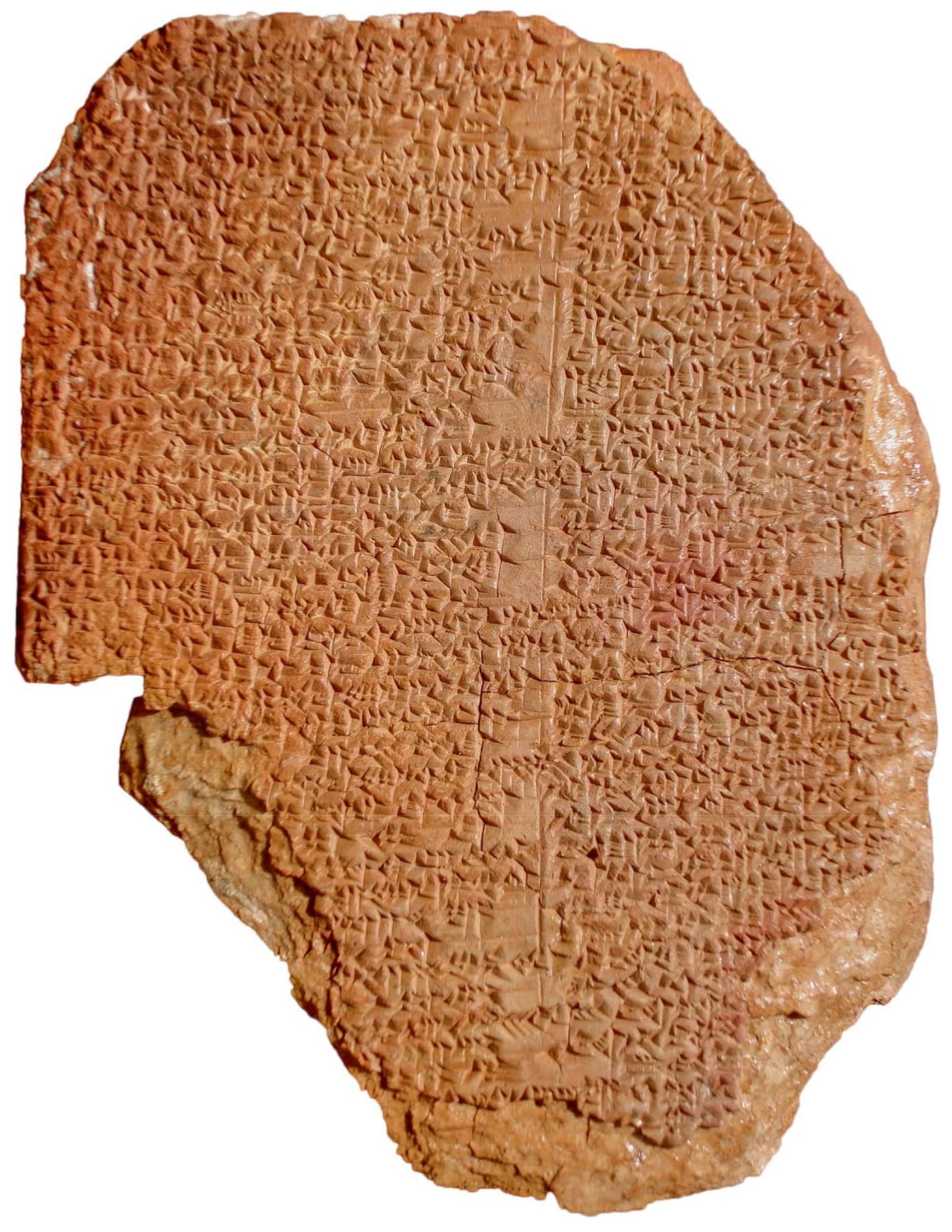
The Gilgamesh Dream Tablet

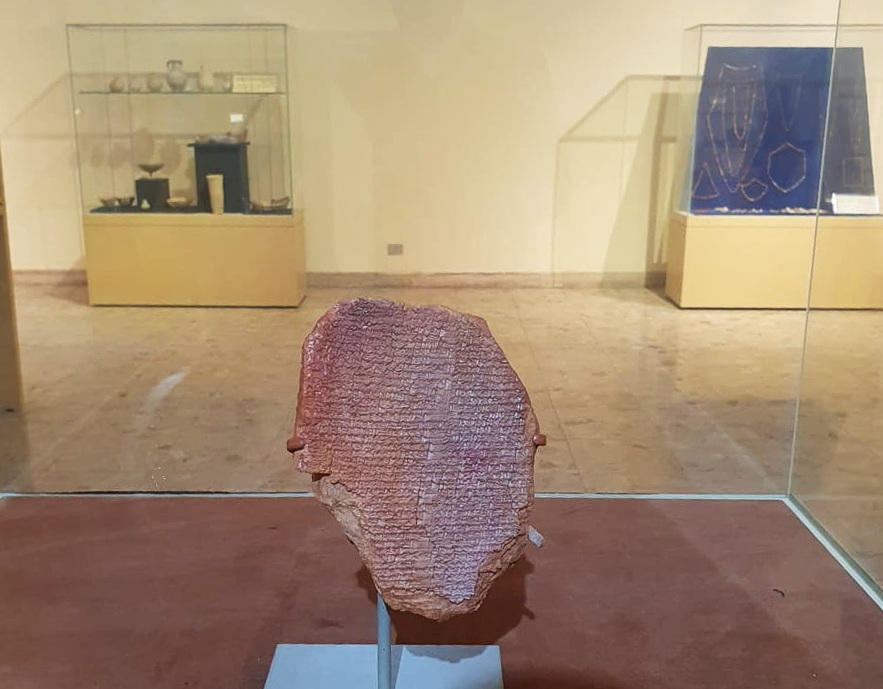
The Gilgamesh Dream Tablet is from Iraq in the Middle Babylonian Period, First Sealand Dynasty, 1732-1460 BCE. It is on display at the Iraq Museum, Baghdad, after being recovered from the Museum of the Bible of Hobby Lobby, Washington DC.

In October 2019, officials from the British Egypt Exploration Society, a nonprofit organization that manages the Papyri Project, alleged that Oxford academic Dirk Obbink engaged in the theft and sale of "at least 11 ancient Bible fragments to the Green family, the Hobby Lobby owners who operate a Bible museum and charitable organization in Washington". The museum said it will return the fragments to the Egypt Exploration Society and Oxford University.

In March 2020, National Geographic reported that the museum was "reevaluating the provenance of all the material in its collection" with the intent of returning stolen objects. Steve Green, the museum's board chairman and the president of Hobby Lobby, announced the museum will be returning 11,500 artifacts to Egypt and Iraq, including thousands of papyrus scraps and ancient clay pieces. Green admitted, "I knew little about the world of collecting [...] The criticism of the museum resulting from my mistakes was justified." Manchester University papyrologist Roberta Mazza stated that the Green family "poured millions on the legal and illegal antiquities market without having a clue about the history, the material features, cultural value, fragilities, and problems of the objects".

This return includes the Gilgamesh Dream Tablet, containing part of the Epic of Gilgamesh, discovered in Iraq in 1853, sold by the Jordanian Antiquities Association to an antiquities dealer in 2003, and sold again by Christie's auction house to Hobby Lobby in 2014 for $1.6 million. The auction house lied about how the artifact had entered the market, claiming it had been on the market in the United States for decades. In September 2019, federal authorities seized the tablet, and in May 2020, a civil complaint was filed to forfeit it.

In January 2021, 8,000 clay objects were transferred to the Iraq Museum, and Steve Green announced, "we transferred control of the fine art storage facility that housed the 5,000 Egyptian items to the U.S. government as part of a voluntary administrative process. We understand the U.S. government has now delivered the papyri to Egyptian officials."

In July 2021, the United States Department of Justice announced it had seized the Gilgamesh tablet from Hobby Lobby for repatriation to Iraq. Acting U.S. Attorney Jacquelyn M. Kasulis for the Eastern District of New York stated, “This office is committed to combating the black-market sale of cultural property and the smuggling of looted artifacts.” Hobby Lobby failed to follow expert advice on antiquities collecting which has resulted in multiple seizures and fines.

In August 2021, Iraq reclaimed 17,000 looted artifacts previously held by the Museum of the Bible.
