= The Myth of Persecution =

Scholarly book on the history of Christianity

- Author: Candida Moss
- Language: English
- Genre: Christian history, Roman history
- Publisher: HarperCollins
- Publication date: 2013
- Publication place: United States
- Media type: Print (hardcover)
- Pages: 308
- ISBN: 978-0-06-210452-6

The Myth of Persecution: How Early Christians Invented a Story of Martyrdom is a 2013 book by Candida Moss, an award-winning historian and professor of New Testament and Early Christianity at the University of Notre Dame. Prior to the writing of this book Moss had published two other works on early Christian martyrdom. In her book, Moss advances the thesis that:

1. The traditional idea of the "Age of Martyrdom", when Christians suffered persecution from the Roman authorities and lived in fear of being thrown to the lions, is largely fictional. Here she adapts and emends the work of G. E. M. de Ste. Croix.
2. There was never sustained, targeted persecution of Christians by Imperial Roman authorities. Official persecution of Christians by order of the Roman Emperor lasted for at most twelve years of the first three hundred of the Church's history. Moss writes: "This does not mean, however, that there were no martyrs at all or that Christians never died. It is clear that some people were cruelly tortured and brutally executed for reasons that strike us as profoundly unjust."
3. Most of the stories of individual martyrs amassed by the early modern period are pure inventions. She agrees with Bollandist scholar Hippolyte Delehaye that most martyrdom literature developed in the fourth century and beyond.
4. Even the oldest and most historically accurate stories of martyrs and their sufferings have been altered and re-written by later editors, so that it is impossible to know for sure what any of the martyrs actually thought, did or said.

== Contents ==
=== Martyrdom before Christianity ===
The book explains the origin of the Greek word "martyr" and how it came to be used by Christians as signifying someone who had witnessed for Christ with their life. Moss states that some scholars have held that martyrdom did not exist in previous eras. She draws upon the work of scholars like Glen Bowersock and Jan Willem van Hentern to show that there were examples of martyrs among earlier Jews, Greeks and Romans, they were just not called by that term. Citing the deaths of Socrates and the aged Jewish teacher Eleazar. Moss maintains that these accounts heavily influenced Christian martyrdom narratives, to the extent that "Christians adapted their ideas about martyrdom and sometimes even the stories themselves" (italics in original) "from both ancient Jewish and pagan writers."

=== Historicity ===
It is a central thesis of the book that the ancient writings on martyrs and martyrdom are not reliable accounts of the events described. Moss characterizes most of the later extant sources, as "elaborate, ornate, entertaining, and far from the truth". Moss also finds similarities between the events related and those of ancient Greek romance novels. In her book, Moss examined the oldest and generally agreed to be most authentic of the martyrdom accounts: the Martyrdom of Polycarp, the Acts of Ptolemaeus and Lucius, the account of the trial and death of Justin Martyr and companions, the Acts of the Scillitan Martyrs, the story of Perpetua and Felicity, and the Persecution in Lyon involving the bishop Pothinus, Blandina and several others. She claims that "none of the early Christian martyrdom stories is completely historically accurate. Even if portions of the accounts are possible and even probable, we can't be sure that they provide us with accurate information about the manner in which the Christians died."

==== Examination of primary sources ====
In her examination of the "Martyrdom of Polycarp", Moss claims that it contains "many wild coincidences, improbabilities and illegalities". While not denying that Polycarp really suffered martyrdom, she observes that it is "impossible for us to imagine that the Martyrdom of Polycarp is a historical account of the events as they actually happened".

Moss examines the tortures and deaths of Saints Pothinus, Blandina, and others in Church History by Eusebius of Caesarea. While the events occurred in Gaul about 177, the author notes that they originate from a version that is partially preserved in a text compiled two hundred years after the events. In the text, Moss notes inconsistencies between the quoted cities and provinces of the Empire. Moss claims that various theological terms used were not otherwise attested before the third century. Moss notes that the letter begins by saying that the events are "worthy of undying remembrance" and she observes that the phrase was also used by Eusebius in both the Church History and his Martyrs of Palestine. According to Moss, these indicate that the letter was edited by Eusebius and that it is, therefore, difficult to tell which parts of it are historical and which parts were added by Eusebius for theological purposes.

=== Duration ===
According to Moss, although provincial governors in the Roman Empire had a great deal of personal discretion and power to do what they felt was needed in their jurisdiction, and there were local and sporadic incidents of persecution and mob violence against Christians, for most of the first three hundred years of Christian history Christians were able to live in peace, practice professions, and rise to positions of responsibility. "We are talking about fewer than ten years out of nearly three hundred during which Christians were executed as the result of imperial initiatives."

=== Reasons for persecution ===
Moss holds that the Romans interpreted refusal to burn incense and make sacrificial offerings to an image of the Emperor as seditious and a sign of possible treason. They were not concerned with religious doctrine, but political rebellion.

=== Rewards for martyrs ===
Moss describes Church teachings that, once dead, all would wait for the Day of Judgement to decide one's eternal fate – all except for martyrs, who were awarded a martyr's crown and immediately went to heaven. For this reason some Christians deliberately sought martyrdom in a quest for a martyr's crown.

=== Conclusions ===
It is the author's contention that there are consequences of the promotion of such a "myth" that reaches the present day. While accepting that there were genuine cases of martyrdom and state persecutions of Christians, the author goes on to claim that the idea of a persecuted church was greatly exaggerated, especially by the early church historian Eusebius. The author concludes that the idea that Christians have always been persecuted by the powers of evil, and always will be, has led to a combative and aggressive attitude by Christians even today. This is evidenced, according to Moss, by the invocation of the persecution of Christians in debates over such issues as abortion and same-sex marriage.

== Reception ==
Laura Miller, writing for Salon, reviewed The Myth of Persecution. She said that "Moss ... is thorough, strives for clarity and is genuinely fired up in her concern for the influence of the myth of martyrdom on Western societies."

New Testament scholar Greg Carey, writing for The Christian Century, wrote "Grounded in ten years of research on martyr traditions. Moss's basic position will surprise few historians. Though early Christian texts assign martyrdom a constitutive role in the church's story, non-Christian sources refuse to corroborate this picture. Like the ancient poets, Moss at once instructs and entertains. Admirably weaving clear argumentation into vivid narration and demonstrating authoritative command of the primary sources. Moss advances her case by means of several important arguments." He adds "At a minimum, the martyrdom myth encourages true believers to dismiss their opponents and their opponents' humanity, creating obstacles to understanding, compromise and common endeavor. Here historiography meets real life, as Moss's exposure of the martyrdom myth opens a path to a new way of seeing the world and our neighbors."

James F. McGrath the Clarence L. Goodwin Chair of New Testament Language and Literature at Butler University writes on his blog "Moss does a fantastic job of illustrating points about ancient evidence and rhetoric by using modern examples and illustrations – from doubts about a widely-circulated version of the dialogue that allegedly preceded the murder of Cassie Bernall, to baseball as a "religion," to the function of appealing to the Founding Fathers."

In the National Catholic Reporter, Maureen Daly said "Moss, scholar of the early church and martyrs, contends persecution was rare and the duration brief. Why is this important? 'The myth of Christian martyrdom is not only inaccurate; it has contributed to great violence and continues to support a view of the world in which we are under attack from our fellow human beings,' she writes."

Kirkus Reviews said "The myth of martyrdom—and the expectation of huge rewards in heaven—was effective in organizing a cohesive early Christian identity, which involved the notion of being 'under attack' and justified a violent reaction...she provides an intriguing venture that begs for more research and focus."

Anne T. Thayer praises the book for its "impressive scholarship", though Moss "overstates the position she is critiquing and understates the truth within it, using overly strict definitions in her analysis".

Paul Hartog says that Moss made many good points, including the distinction between persecution and prosecution, and remarks that eventually Christians became the persecutors. He also agrees with Moss that persecution of Christians was "generally sporadic, largely local, and normally decentralized." Still, Hartog says that the maltreatment of some early Christians was real: "Rather than inciting a 'martyr complex' leading to retaliation, the limited but real maltreatment of early Christians can, if the conversation is reoriented, actually lead to insights and renewed interest in a universal concept of religious liberty." He also says that historical reconsiderations and corrections should not "downplay the real suffering of those who were indeed maltreated, or the pain of the families and faith communities of the executed."

Moss was strongly criticized by other Christian reviewers. Ephraim Radner, a historical theologian, reviewed the book in First Things. He wrote that "according to Moss's criteria... The rule is apparently to read skeptically the writings of the past, but not to doubt the imaginations of present-day scholars. The whole book, however, begs for the latter suspicion. Her framing chapters on the dishonesty and dangers of 'persecution' claims by contemporary conservative political voices and religious leaders easily identify her bias." Radner also accused Moss of having simply reframed the theories of Edward Gibbon's multi-volume work The History of the Decline and Fall of the Roman Empire.

Church historian Michael Haykin said: "The Myth of Persecution: How Early Christians Invented a Story of Martyrdom is written for a readership familiar with conspiracy theories in which a sinister elite manipulates history for its own dastardly ends...Moss has the scholarly credentials and knowledge to make her case sound convincing, though, in the final analysis, her thesis is far from compelling."

In his review on the Review of Biblical Literature, New Testament scholar N. Clayton Croy said: "Modern ideology drives Moss's thesis more than ancient testimony, and the result is a distortion of history more severe than the caricature she wants to expose [...] Despite the author's considerable erudition, this is a deeply flawed book, a work of revisionist history. One might judge that conservative Christians in the West have sometimes overplayed the persecution card, but they have not created instances of cultural hostility out of whole cloth, and they certainly did not create the "Age of the Martyrs" out of thin air. More important, Moss largely overlooks modern Christianity in the two-thirds world, especially in the Middle East and in Communist states. Here we find not just cultural insensitivity but old-fashioned persecution: arrests, beatings, and decapitations". Old Testament scholar Michael S. Heiser agreed by saying that Croy's "review does an excellent job of showing how Moss's work is agenda-driven and plays a sleight-of-hand game with relevant data. That's unfortunate."

New Testament scholar Michael F. Bird, writing on his blog Euangelion, criticized Moss's book, stating: "Moss is right in many regards: yes, there was a Christian hagiography about martyrs. The Martyrdom of Polycarp and the Acts of Paul and Thecla are not Discovery Channel documentaries. Yes, many Conservative have a martyr complex and beat their breasts in rage when their social privileges are under threat. However, her modern treatment of modern phenomena of persecution against Christians in the developing world was, to be frank, lacking nuance." Later, Bird said that some clarifications by Moss about her claims "assuaged" some of his "earlier feelings about the book," though in the same article Bird also reported a review of The Myth of Persecution by a Coptic Christian woman critical of Moss' approach to contemporary persecutions of Christians.

Writing on the Christian Research Journal, historian Paul L. Maier was strongly critical toward Moss's book, calling it "an outrage anyone who has even a rudimentary knowledge of Christian history": Maier accepts that the martyrologies are exaggerated (noting that a group in the Church called "Bollandists" was organized to moderate these excessive reports, something that Moss herself argues at length in the book), but notes that both Christian and anti-Christian sources agree that there were indeed persecution of Christians. He also dismisses Moss's attempt to weaken the historicity of Tacitus's writings about the Neronian persecution, noting that such persecution is also reported by Suetonius in The Twelve Caesars and notes that several martyrdoms were recorded by eyewitnesses (such as Ignatius of Antioch in his epistles or the Diocletian persecution by Eusebius). He concludes stating that a more honest title for the book would be The Myth of Exaggerated Persecution: How Later Christians Embellished the Record.

Ecclesiastical historian Carl Trueman also criticized The Myth of Persecution, saying that "As a historical thesis it is scarcely radical and reflects what I was taught as an undergraduate and what I teach in my M.Div. classes...it is the political thesis to which she moves that is far more contentious" and pointing at "the ultimate political purpose of the book." A reviewer in Themelios described the book as "a sensationalized political agenda masquerading as religious history." Another reviewer from The Public Discourse states: "Unfortunately, Moss uses her expertise in early martyrology to fashion a polemic against contemporary Christianity for its alleged psychological dysfunction...Moss's Myth is a case study in how scholarship gives way to politicized polemic." New Testament scholar Ben Witherington III said that Moss "is guilty of the very sin she accuses the early church fathers of: exaggeration, in some cases, probably gross exaggeration when it comes to downplaying the persecution and martyring of early Christians."

In the context of the contemporary persecution of some Christian groups, scholar and author Robert Royal says: "There are myths of persecution and myths of a lack of persecution. Professor Moss has chosen to write a new chapter in the latter mold."

== Reviews ==
- Carey, Greg (22 April 2013). "The Myth of Persecution". Christian Century.
- Trueman, Carl (27 June 2013). "The Myth of Persecution". Aquila Report.
- Radner, Ephraim (May 2013). "Unmythical Martyrs A review of The Myth of Persecution: How Early Christians Invented a Story of Martyrdom". First Things.
- Neff, David (August 2013). "Real Martyrs Don't Murder". Christianity Today.
- Croy, N. Clayton (3 October 2013). "Review of Candida Moss, The Myth of Persecution: How Early Christians Invented a Story of Martyrdom" (PDF). Review of Biblical Literature. Archived from the original (PDF) on 2013-11-02.
- "The Death of Jesus and the Rise of the Christian Persecution Myth - review". The Daily Beast. 31 March 2013.
- Miller, Laura (24 February 2013). ""The Myth of Persecution": Early Christians weren't persecuted". Salon. Archived from the original on February 25, 2013.
- Daly, Maureen (27 March 2013). "The long shadow of the martyr myth". National Catholic Reporter.
- Blake, John (30 March 2013). "Christ was persecuted, but what about Christians?". CNN Belief Blog.
- "THE MYTH OF PERSECUTION How Early Christians Invented a Story of Persecution". Kirkus Reviews. 26 November 2012.
