= He Gets Us =

Christian advertising campaign (2022–present)

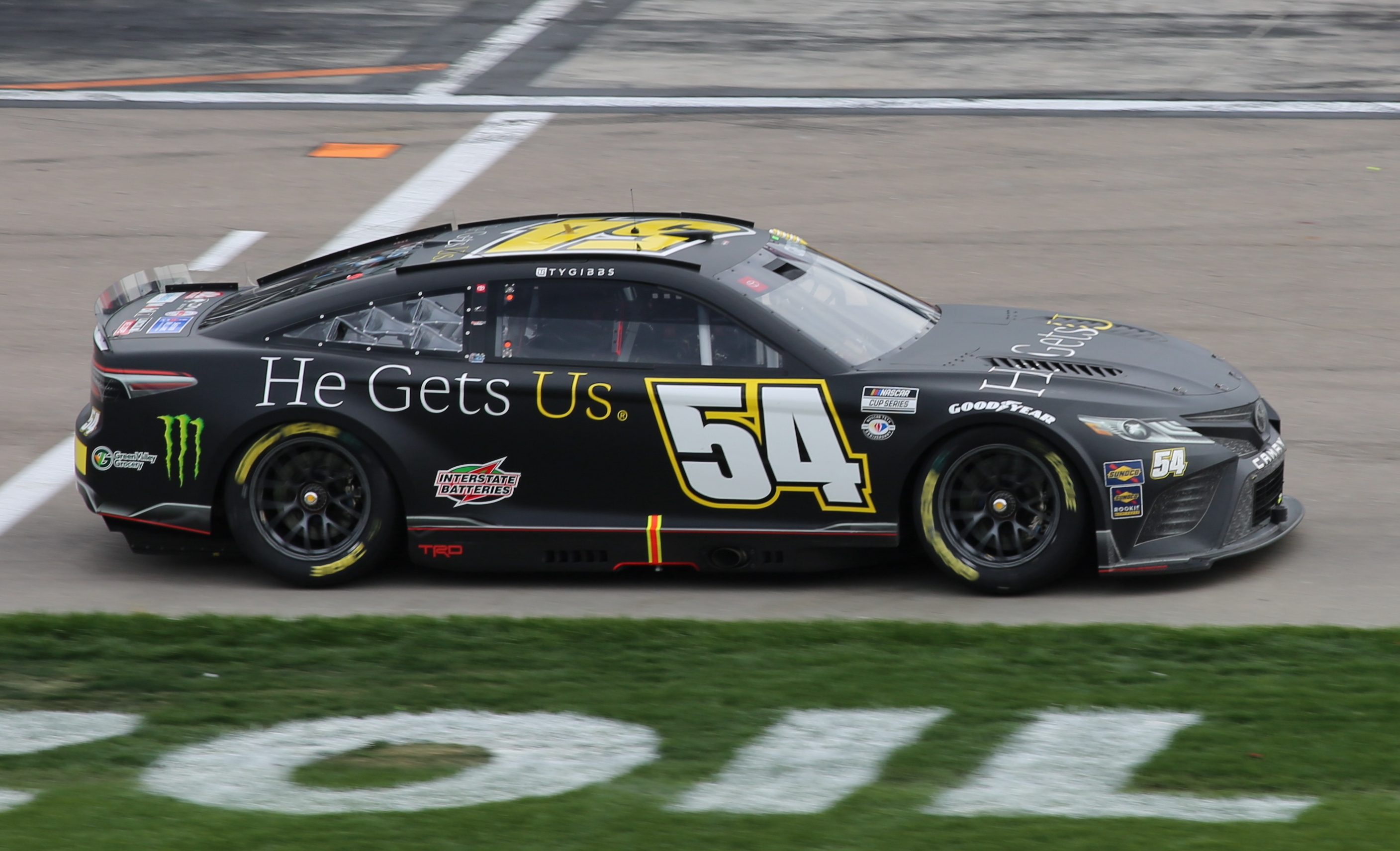
Ty Gibbs driving the No. 54 "He Gets Us" car in the NASCAR Cup Series during the 2023 Pala Casino 400.

"He Gets Us" is an ongoing American religious advertising campaign formerly operated by the Servant Foundation. First launched in 2022, the campaign's stated goal is to "reintroduce people to the Jesus of the Bible".

Its campaigns are designed to cater to younger demographics and religious skeptics via allusions to present-day social movements, with an emphasis on values such as inclusion, compassion, and "radical forgiveness". At least US$100 million was initially spent on the campaign, which has included billboards, sponsor placements, and television commercials. The campaign aired multiple spots during the 2022–23 NFL playoffs, including two during Super Bowl LVII. They also aired spots during Super Bowls LVIII, LIX and LX.

"He Gets Us" has faced criticism over the extensive spending by the campaign, its donors' support of anti-abortion and anti-LGBTQ groups, and disputes over claims that the campaign is apolitical.

== Campaign ==
The campaign, consisting of billboards, online ads, and television commercials, was rolled out in March 2022 by the Servant Foundation. The ads feature imagery and content that create parallels between historical events and modern social movements to stories of Jesus, and contain themes of inclusivity; a spokesperson stated that its aim was to "reintroduce people to the Jesus of the Bible", described as "the Jesus of radical forgiveness, compassion, and love".

The campaign primarily targets younger demographics and religious skeptics. It contains allusions to social justice movements, with one ad referring to Jesus as "an influencer who became insanely popular", before he was "canceled" after he "stood up for something he believed in". AJ Willingham of CNN described the campaign as "portraying the pivotal figure of Christianity as an immigrant, a refugee, a radical, an activist for women’s rights and a bulwark against racial injustice and political corruption".

The campaign describes itself as being apolitical; Jason Vanderground, a consultant involved with the campaign, described the approach being taken by "He Gets Us" as one intended to "transcend politics". Although the campaign's public-facing website states that it is not affiliated with any particular sect or church, an outreach website intended for churches and other partners states that it is inspired by the Lausanne Covenant.

"He Gets Us" has purchased advertising during sporting events, including in-venue sponsor placements, as well as television commercials; three separate ads ran during the 2022–23 NFL playoffs, and the campaign purchased two spots during Super Bowl LVII on February 12, 2023. The campaign has sponsored driver Ty Gibbs of Joe Gibbs Racing in NASCAR events; during the 2022 NASCAR Xfinity Series season, it sponsored his car in two races. When Gibbs moved to the NASCAR Cup Series the following year, He Gets Us agreed to sponsor his car for six races. The campaign aired two advertisements during Super Bowl LVIII, which focused on the theme of loving one's neighbor.

== Funding ==
The advertisements were initially funded by the Servant Foundation, a non-profit donor-advised fund sponsor which does business as The Signatry; most individual donors have chosen to remain anonymous. One of the campaign's backers is David Green, the founder of Hobby Lobby. $100 million was spent on the campaign initially. In 2023, Vanderground stated the organization intended to spend a billion dollars on the campaign within the next three years.

As of early 2024, the campaign was under new leadership and no longer affiliated with the Servant Foundation; instead, it is overseen by a new nonprofit organization named Come Near.

== Reception ==
Some of the campaign's ads have been viewed millions of times on YouTube, including one named "The Rebel" which was seen 122 million times within a year of its uploading. According to Vanderground, the campaign had reached 100 million people as of October 2022. Its Super Bowl LVII ads garnered attention on social media, and caused an increase in Google searches for the campaign during the game.

Jacobin and CNN have discussed a perceived incongruity between the campaign's professed values and those of its donors, who have also given money to anti-abortion and anti-LGBT organizations such as the Alliance Defending Freedom, which the Southern Poverty Law Center (SPLC) considers a hate group. In response to its television commercials, Congresswoman Alexandria Ocasio-Cortez argued that Jesus "would not spend millions of dollars on Super Bowl ads to make fascism look benign".

Critics have similarly disputed the campaign's claims of being apolitical, noting allusions to themes and terminology used by conservatives such as cancel culture; Josiah R. Daniels of Sojourners disputed its equation of cancel culture to crucifixion, explaining that "on one side, people are coming to terms with their lives after experiencing consequences; on the other, people are being executed because of their low standing in society." Daniels also argued that "whether they recognize or admit it, it is practically impossible to be apolitical when it comes to the issues referenced on their site. Furthermore, imagining Jesus as apolitical is itself a political decision — and it is a decision that aligns with politically and financially powerful interests." Contrarily, late conservative commentator Charlie Kirk criticized the campaign for promoting liberal and left-wing ideology, referring to its backers as "woke tricksters".

The campaign has been criticized for allegedly deemphasizing biblical teachings, and for its expenditures into promoting Jesus as a "brand", which have drawn comparisons to megachurches.
