= Adela Yarbro Collins =

American author and academic (born 1945)

Adela Collins
- Born: Adela Yarbro; 1945 (age 80–81)
- Title: Buckingham Professor of New Testament Criticism and Interpretation
- Board member of: President of the New England Region of the Society of Biblical Literature
- Spouse: John Collins

Academic background
- Education: Pomona College (BA); Harvard University (PhD)
- Thesis: The Combat Myth in the Book of Revelation: a thesis (1975)

Academic work
- Discipline: Biblical studies
- Sub-discipline: New Testament studies
- Institutions: University of Notre Dame, University of Chicago, Yale Divinity School
- Doctoral students: Candida Moss
- Main interests: Gospel of Mark, Book of Revelation

Adela Yarbro Collins (born 1945) is an American author and academic, who served as the Buckingham Professor of New Testament Criticism and Interpretation at Yale Divinity School. Her research focuses on the New Testament, especially the Gospel of Mark and the Book of Revelation. She has also written on the reception of the Pauline epistles, early Christian apocalypticism, and ancient eschatology.

== Biography ==
Born in 1945 as Adela Yarbro, she received a Bachelor of Arts degree from Pomona College, and her master's and PhD degrees from Harvard University. Collins formerly held appointments at the University of Notre Dame (1985–1991) and at the University of Chicago (1991–2000). In 2010, a Festschrift was published in her honor: Women and Gender in Ancient Religions (ISBN 3-16150-579-4).

== Career and research ==
Collins's work has focussed on Apocalypticism, the Book of Revelation, and the Gospel of Mark. Among her many books Mark: A Commentary (Fortress 2007); Crisis and Catharsis: The Power of Apocalypse (Westminster, 1984); and The Combat Myth in the Book of Revelation (Harvard Dissertations in Religion 9; Missoula, MT: Scholars Press for the Harvard Theological Review; reprinted Wipf and Stock, 2001) stand out as major contributions to the field. Collins is considered one of the pioneers in understanding apocalyptic literature in Judaism and Christianity and her commentary on Mark has been called a "landmark in Markan scholarship."

She is noted for her mentorship of students in particular her support for women biblical scholars. Her colleague Michal Beth Dinkler said in a tribute to Collins "Adela has helped to pave the way for younger female scholars like myself in a field that continues to be dominated by men." Collins served as dissertation adviser to a number of biblical scholars including Paul Holloway, James Kelhoffer, Stephen Ahearne-Kroll, and Candida Moss.

== Honors and awards ==
Collins has also served as the president of the Society of New Testament Studies (2010–2011), as the president of the New England Region of the Society of Biblical Literature (2004–2005), and as president of the Society of Biblical Literature (2022–2023). In 2014 she was awarded honorary doctorates in theology by the University of Oslo, Norway. In 2015 she received a second honorary doctorate from the University of Zurich. In 2018 she was a joint recipient of the University of Mainz's Gutenberg Research Award. In 2020 she was elected as a member of the American Academy of Arts and Sciences.

== Personal life ==
Adela Yarbro is married to John Collins, the Holmes Professor of Old Testament Criticism and Interpretation at Yale Divinity School. The two co-authored King and Messiah as Son of God (Grand Rapids: Eerdmans, 2008).

== Selected works ==
=== Thesis ===
- Collins, Adela Yarbro (1975). The Combat Myth in the Book of Revelation (Ph.D.). Harvard University. OCLC 2433881.

=== Books ===
- ——— (1976). The Combat Myth in the Book of Revelation. Scholars Press. ISBN 9781579107161.
- ——— (1984). Crisis and Catharsis: The Power of the Apocalypse. Louisville: Westminster. ISBN 9780664245214.
- ——— (1988). The Gospel and Women: The 1987 Fred O. Francis Memorial Lectures in Religion. Orange Calif.: Chapman College Press.
- ——— (1990). Is Mark's Gospel a Life of Jesus? The Question of Genre. Madison: Marquette University Press. ISBN 9780874625455.
- ——— (1992). The Beginning of the Gospel: probings of Mark in Context. Minneapolis: Fortress Press. ISBN 9781579107659.
- ——— (1996). Cosmology and Eschatology in Jewish and Christian Apocalypticism. Supplements to the Journal for the Study of Judaism. Vol. 50. Leiden: Brill. ISBN 9789004105874. OCLC 34973630.
- ——— (2007). Mark: A Commentary. Hermeneia - a critical and historical commentary on the Bible. Minneapolis, MN: Fortress. ISBN 9780800660789. OCLC 85851521.
- ———; Collins, John J. (2008). King and Messiah as Son of God: divine, human, and angelic Messianic figures in Biblical and related literature. Grand Rapids, MI: Eerdmans. ISBN 9780802807724. OCLC 213452267.
- ——— (2022). Paul Transformed: Reception of the Person and Letters of Paul in Antiquity. Anchor Yale Bible Reference Library. New Haven, CT: Yale University Press. ISBN 9780300194425.

=== Edited by ===
- Adela Yarbro Collins, ed. (1985). Feminist Perspectives on Biblical Scholarship. Semeia. Atlanta: SBL Press. ISBN 9780891307730.
- Adela Yarbro Collins, ed. (1986). Early Christian Apocalypticism: Genre and Social Setting. Semeia. Atlanta: SBL Press. ISBN 9781589832831.
- Holloway, Paul A. (2017). Adela Yarbro Collins (ed.). Philippians: A Commentary. Hermeneia - a critical and historical commentary on the Bible. Minneapolis, MN: Fortress. ISBN 9780800660963. OCLC 1000582553.

=== Festschrift ===
- Ahearne-Kroll, Stephen P. (2010). Women and Gender in Ancient Religions: Interdisciplinary Approaches. Wissenschaftliche Untersuchungen zum Neuen Testament. Vol. 263. Tübingen: Mohr Siebeck. ISBN 9783161505799. OCLC 700340556.

== See also ==
- John J. Collins
- Candida Moss
