= John J. Collins =

Irish-American biblical scholar and professor (born 1946)

- Born: 1946 (age 79–80); County Tipperary, Ireland
- Title: Holmes Professor of Old Testament Criticism and Interpretation at Yale Divinity School
- Spouse: Adela Collins (nee Yarbro)

Academic background
- Education: University College Dublin; Harvard University
- Thesis: (1972)

Academic work
- Discipline: Biblical studies and commentator
- Institutions: University of Notre Dame; Harvard University; University of Chicago; Yale Divinity School
- Main interests: Second Temple Judaism, Hellenistic period, Dead Sea Scrolls

John Joseph Collins (born 1946, County Tipperary) is an Irish-born American biblical scholar, the Holmes Professor of Old Testament Criticism and Interpretation at Yale Divinity School. He is noted for his research in the Hebrew Bible, as well as the apocryphal works of the Second Temple period including the sectarian works found in Dead Sea Scrolls and their relation to Christian origins. Collins has published and edited over 300 scholarly works, and a number of popular level articles and books. Among his best known works are the Between Athens and Jerusalem: Jewish Identity in the Hellenistic Diaspora (New York: Crossroad, 1983); Daniel in the Hermeneia commentary series (Minneapolis: Fortress, 1993); The Scepter and the Star. The Messiahs of the Dead Sea Scrolls and Other Ancient Literature (New York: Doubleday, 1995); and The Bible after Babel: Historical Criticism in a Postmodern Age (Grand Rapids, Eerdmans, 2005).

Collins was born in County Tipperary, Ireland, and attended high school in a boarding school (Rockwell College) run by the Holy Ghost Fathers in Cashel, Tipperary. After high school he joined the Holy Ghost Fathers and spent nine years with the order. He was educated at University College Dublin (BA, MA) and Harvard University (PhD). He has held academic positions at a number of institutions, including the University of Notre Dame (1985–91), Harvard University and the University of Chicago (1991–2000). Collins has additional honorary degrees from University College Dublin (2009) and the University of Zurich (2015). He served as president of the Chicago Society of Biblical Research (1995–96), of the Catholic Biblical Association of America (1996–97), and of the Society of Biblical Literature (2002), and as regional president for the New England and Eastern Canada region of the Society of Biblical Literature (2008). He has also served as editor in chief of Dead Sea Discoveries, Supplements to the Journal for the Study of Judaism and the Journal of Biblical Literature. He became the General Editor for the Anchor Yale Bible Series in 2008.

Collins is the husband of Adela Yarbro Collins, who served as the Buckingham Professor of New Testament Criticism and Interpretation at Yale Divinity School from 2000 till 2019, with whom he has co-authored King and Messiah as Son of God (Grand Rapids: Wm. B. Eerdmans, 2008).

== Selected works ==
- Collins, John J. (1983). Between Athens and Jerusalem: Jewish Identity in the Hellenistic Diaspora. New York: Crossroad.
- ——— (1984). The Apocalyptic Imagination: An Introduction to Jewish Apocalyptic Literature. New York: Crossroad.
- ——— (1995). The Scepter and the Star. The Messiahs of the Dead Sea Scrolls and Other Ancient Literature. New York: Doubleday.
- ——— (1998). The Apocalyptic Imagination: An Introduction to Jewish Apocalyptic Literature (2nd ed.). Grand Rapids, MI: Eerdmans.
- ——— (2004). Introduction to the Hebrew Bible. Minneapolis, MN: Fortress Press. ISBN 978-1-5064-4598-4.
- ——— (2005). Encounters with Biblical Theology. Minneapolis, MN: Fortress Press. ISBN 0-8006-3769-0. Description.
- ——— (2009). Beyond the Qumran Community. The Sectarian Movement of the Dead Sea Scrolls. Grand Rapids: Eerdmans.
- ———; Harlow, Daniel C., eds. (2010). The Dictionary of Early Judaism. Grand Rapids: Eerdmans. ISBN 978-0-8028-2549-0.
- ——— (2010). The Scepter and the Star. The Messiahs of the Dead Sea Scrolls and Other Ancient Literature. Anchor Yale Bible Reference Library (2nd ed.). New York: Doubleday. ISBN 978-0-385-47457-3.
- ——— (2012). The Dead Sea Scrolls: A Biography. Princeton: Princeton University Press.
- ——— (2013). Early Judaism: A Comprehensive Overview (2nd revised ed.). Grand Rapids, MI: Eerdmans. ISBN 978-0-8028-6922-7.
- ——— (2017). The Invention of Judaism: Torah and Jewish Identity from Deuteronomy to Paul. University of California Press. ISBN 978-0-520-29412-7.
- ——— (2025). Introduction to the Hebrew Bible (4th ed.). Minneapolis, MN: Fortress Press. ISBN 9798889834649.
- ——— (2025). A Short Introduction to the Hebrew Bible (4th ed.). Minneapolis, MN: Fortress Press. ISBN 9798889834663.
