= Servant Foundation =

American non-profit organization

- Formation: Tax-exempt since December 2000; 25 years ago
- Type: 501(c)(3)
- Tax ID no.: EIN: 431890105
- Headquarters: Overland Park
- Services: Donor-advised fund
- Revenue: 592,337,115 USD (2024)
- Expenses: 1,066,207,632 USD (2024)
- Website: thesignatry.com

The Servant Foundation, also known as The Signatry, is an American 501(c)(3) donor-advised fund. It is best known for "He Gets Us", a religious advertising campaign that was first launched in 2022 and is no longer affiliated with Servant. The foundation describes its mission as being to "inspire and facilitate revolutionary, biblical generosity".

The Servant Foundation has been funded in part by the billionaire Green family, who are among fifty other families contributing millions of dollars to the foundation. The Servant Foundation has used that money to fund legislation that is anti-LGBTQ and anti-abortion. Contributions from the foundation to Christian organizations exceed a total amount of $65 million.

== History ==
The Servant Foundation was founded by Bill High in 2000. From 2000 to 2017, it was an affiliate of the National Christian Foundation.

The Servant Foundation's most public facing effort has been the "He Gets Us" advertising campaign, airing during Super Bowl commercial breaks. As of early 2024, the campaign is no longer affiliated with the foundation.
