= Roberta Mazza =

Papyrologist

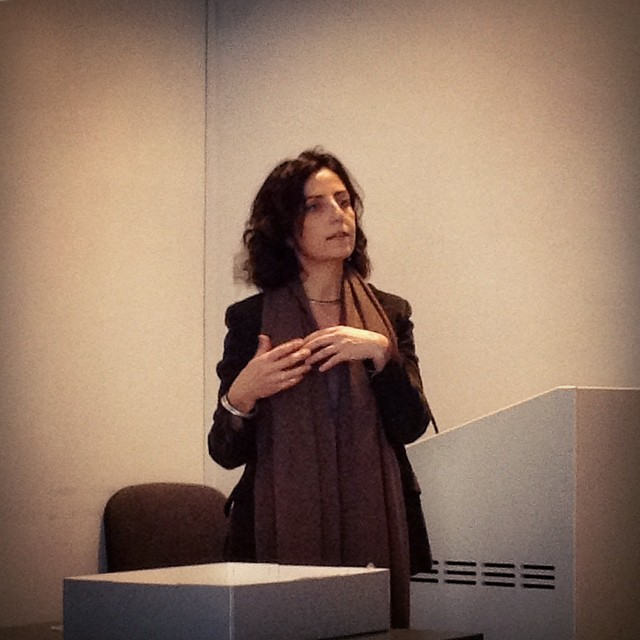
Professor Roberta Mazza (2015)

Roberta Mazza is a Papyrologist and Associate Professor at the Department of Cultural Heritage at the University of Bologna.

== Education ==
Mazza received her PhD from the University of Bologna.

== Research and career ==
Mazza is an expert on Egypt during the Roman and Byzantine periods. She co-curated an exhibition of papyri, portraits and Egyptian contemporary art at the John Rylands Library in 2012, and she has published papyri from the John Rylands collection. Her most recent book, Stolen Fragments: Black Markets, Bad Faith, and the Illicit Trade in Ancient Artefacts, was published in 2024 by Redwood Press and Stanford University Press. The book examines the purchase of a fragment of papyrus dating to the second century CE containing lines from Paul's Letter to the Galatians by Steve Green, the billionaire owner of the craft chain Hobby Lobby. The fragment derived from the holdings of Oxford University and had been sold without the consent of the owners.

Before taking up a position at the University of Bologna in 2022, Mazza was a lecturer in Graeco-Roman material culture at the Department of Classics, Ancient History, Archaeology and Egyptology of the University of Manchester from 2009. She was previously the Tipton Distinguished Visiting Chair in Catholic Studies (Department of Religious Studies) at the University of California, Santa Barbara. Mazza has written for Hyperallergic and Eidolon, and her work has been covered by The Guardian.

== Bibliography ==
- Mazza, R. (2024) Stolen Fragments: Black Markets, Bad Faith, and the Illicit Trade in Ancient Artefacts (Stanford: Stanford University Press)
- Mazza, R. (2021). 'Descriptions and the materiality of texts', Qualitative Research, 21 (3), 376–393
