= Mariupol Bull Figurine =

Looted Neolithic Funerary Art from Mariupol, Ukraine

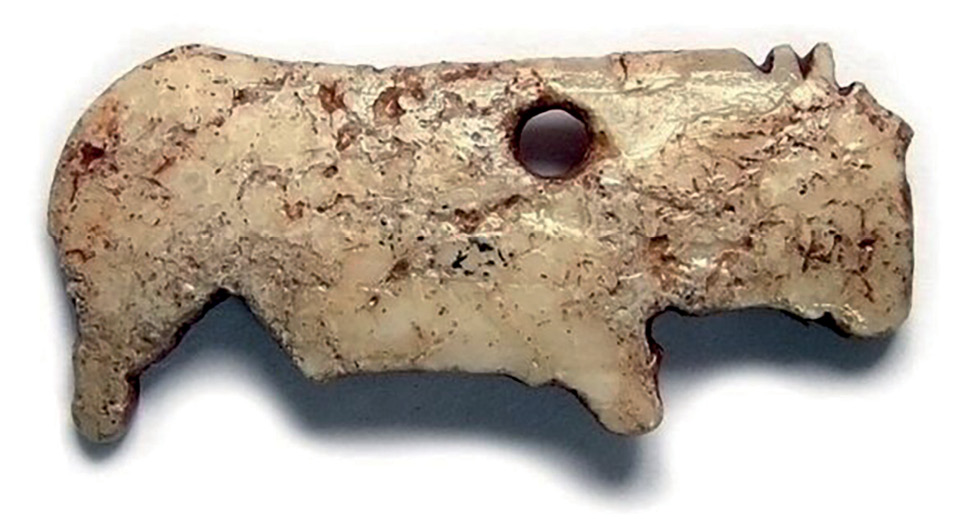
- Material: Boar tusk
- Created: c. 6000 BC
- Discovered: 1930; Mariupol, Donetsk, Ukraine
- Discovered by: Mykola Makarenko
- Present location: Lost

The Mariupol Bull Figurine is a Neolithic period funerary decoration discovered in Mariupol, Ukraine. Made of boar tusk ivory, the piece was discovered by archaeologist Mykola Makarenko in 1930 when investigating the history of prehistoric activity and settlement in the Baltic region. In 2022, during the Siege of Mariupol during the Russian invasion of Ukraine, the figurine went missing, presumably as looted art by the Russian Armed Forces.

== Discovery ==
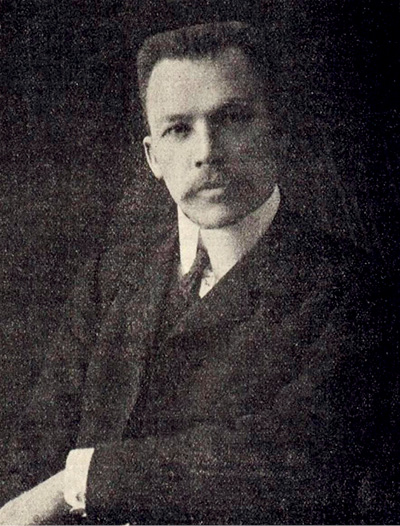
Mykola Makarenko

Mykola Makarenko (1877–1938), a member of the Ukrainian Scientific Society and an assistant curator for the Hermitage Museum, was prominently focused on Ukrainian history and archaeology, ranging from the Neolithic, Kievan Rus', as well as work on the local churches and monasteries.

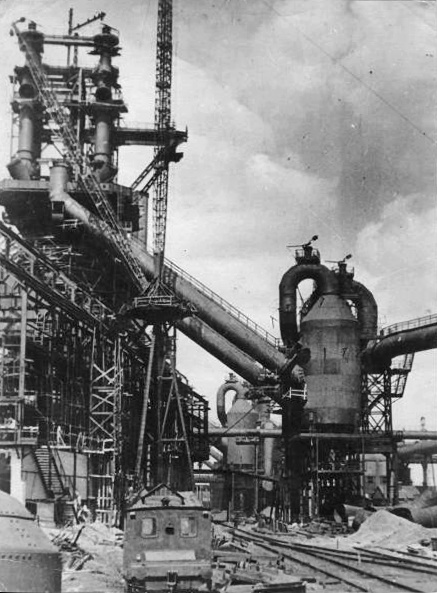
Azovstal Iron and Steel Works, where the Mariupol Neolithic Cemetery was discovered.

From 1930 to 1933, Makarenko was focused on archaeological excavations in a set of cemeteries in Mariupol which ranged from 7000 to 4000 BC, due to the discovery of undisturbed burial goods as well as studies of the early Proto-European population and settlement, among which included many boar tusk artifacts and jewelry The tombs were unearthed as a result of the establishment and construction of the Azovstal Iron and Steel Works in 1930.

The excavations were held from August to October 1930 and Makarenko recorded in his excavation report that the contents of the burial often impeded with the construction, resulting in 12 hour workdays without breaks.

Noted during the total excavation of the cemetery was sedimented red clay 2 x 28 meters, and a total of 124 graves, parallel to each other in the strip. Men were buried oriented to the east, while women were oriented to the west, with gender often determined by the grave goods (men had blades, weapons, women had children burials), due to the poor condition of the bones, which crumbled to dust upon being extracted.

The Bull figurine was found in Burial 101, and is attributed to either a female and/or child burial, decorating either the head, neck or chest of the deceased. What is noted that is that the figurine is expertly crafted, and alongside other boar tusk goods, they served as belt decorations or part of the garments.

Makarenko documented the finds and the figurine in the monograph Маріюпільський могильник (Mariupol Cemetery, 1933).

One year later, he was arrested and sent to Kazan while advocating for the preservation of St. Michael's Golden-Domed Monastery and Saint Sophia Cathedral, Kyiv. As a result of the Great Purge, he was executed in Tomsk in 1938. His excavation report was confiscated by Soviet authorities but was saved and escaped destruction.

== Looting ==
The Bull Figurine was deposited in the Mariupol Museum of Local Lore after its discovery. After Makarenko's purge, many other burial goods from the cemetery were taken. During World War 2, the cemetery and anthropological materials were destroyed.

During the Siege of Mariupol in April 2022, the local museum, built during World War 1 saw further destruction, including the boar ivory goods, and as well as two monoliths holding skeletons from the grave. Russian opposition publication Sobresednik estimates 60,000 of the 70,000 items were destroyed.

Under Russian occupation, Ukrainian officials estimated 2,000 artifacts were looted from the city and taken to the Donbas. The bull figurine was identified as potentially looted due to its appearance in a Russian exhibit that promoted the Azov region as "Russian".

On 5 August 2025, the Antiquities Coalition added the figurine in its "Ten Most Wanted Antiquities" list in coordination with Ukrainian First Deputy Minister of Culture Galyna Grygorenko.
