= Hobby Lobby =

American arts-and-crafts store chain based in Oklahoma

Hobby Lobby Stores, Inc.

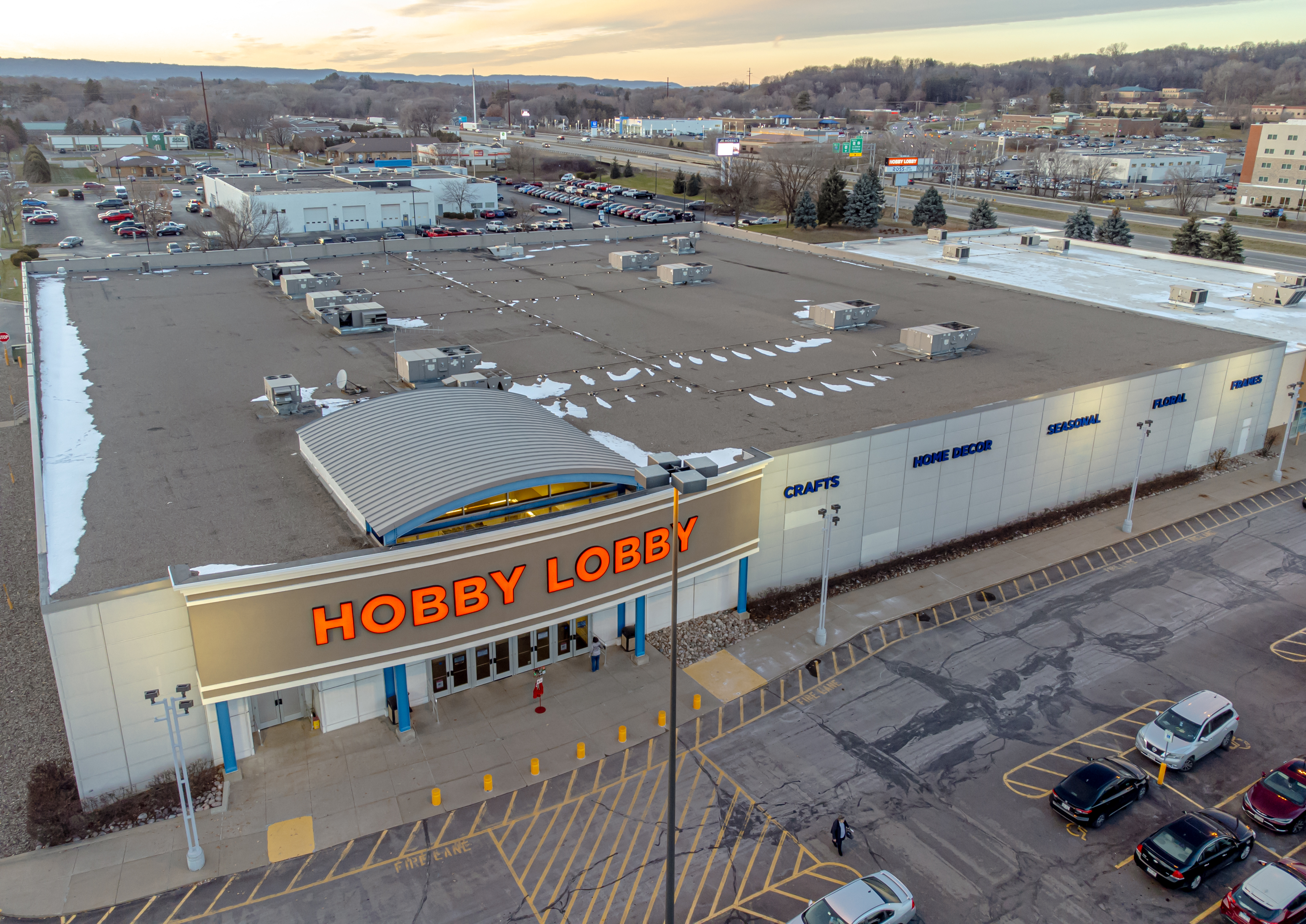
- Hobby Lobby store in Onalaska, Wisconsin
- Formerly: Hobby Lobby Creative Centers
- Type: Private
- Industry: Retail
- Founded: August 3, 1972; 54 years ago, in Oklahoma City, Oklahoma, U.S.
- Founder: David Green
- Headquarters: Oklahoma City, Oklahoma, U.S.
- Number of locations: 1,057
- Area served: United States
- Key people: David Green (CEO); Steve Green (president); Jon Cargill (CFO)
- Products: Arts and crafts supplies, party supplies, jewelry, accessories, furniture, home decor, housewares, bedding, bath, and fabrics
- Revenue: ▲$7.9 billion 2023
- Owner: Green family
- Number of employees: 46,000+ (2025)
- Website: www.hobbylobby.com

Hobby Lobby Stores, Inc., formerly Hobby Lobby Creative Centers, is an American chain of retail arts and crafts stores with a volume of over $5 billion in 2018. The chain has 1,001 stores in 48 U.S. states.

== Retail history ==
In 1972, David Green opened the first Hobby Lobby store in northwest Oklahoma City. Green left his supervisor position with variety store TG&Y to open a second Hobby Lobby in Oklahoma City in 1975. He opened an additional store in Tulsa, Oklahoma, the next year. Hobby Lobby grew to seven stores by mid-1982, and the first store outside Oklahoma opened in 1984. When Green expanded the scope of the business to include furniture and high-end cookware during the early 1980s, it led to losses as the economy slowed. He returned to an arts and crafts emphasis and by late-1992, the chain had grown to 50 locations in seven U.S. states.

As an evangelical Protestant-owned company, Hobby Lobby incorporates American conservative values and Christian media. David Green, the son of a preacher, declares on the Hobby Lobby web site, "Honoring the Lord in all we do by operating the company in a manner consistent with Biblical principles." Similar to Chick-fil-A, all stores are closed on Sundays to "allow employees time for family and worship", according to signs posted on the front doors of their retail stores. Hobby Lobby announced on September 14, 2020, that the company's full-time minimum hourly wage would be raised to $17 effective October 1, 2020, increased from the $15 minimum wage established in 2014. It continued that trend by raising the minimum full-time hourly wage to $18.50, effective January 1, 2022, while increasing its part-time minimum hourly wage by 18% to $13. Hobby Lobby says it has raised its minimum wage twelve times over the thirteen years through 2021.

== Retail strategy ==
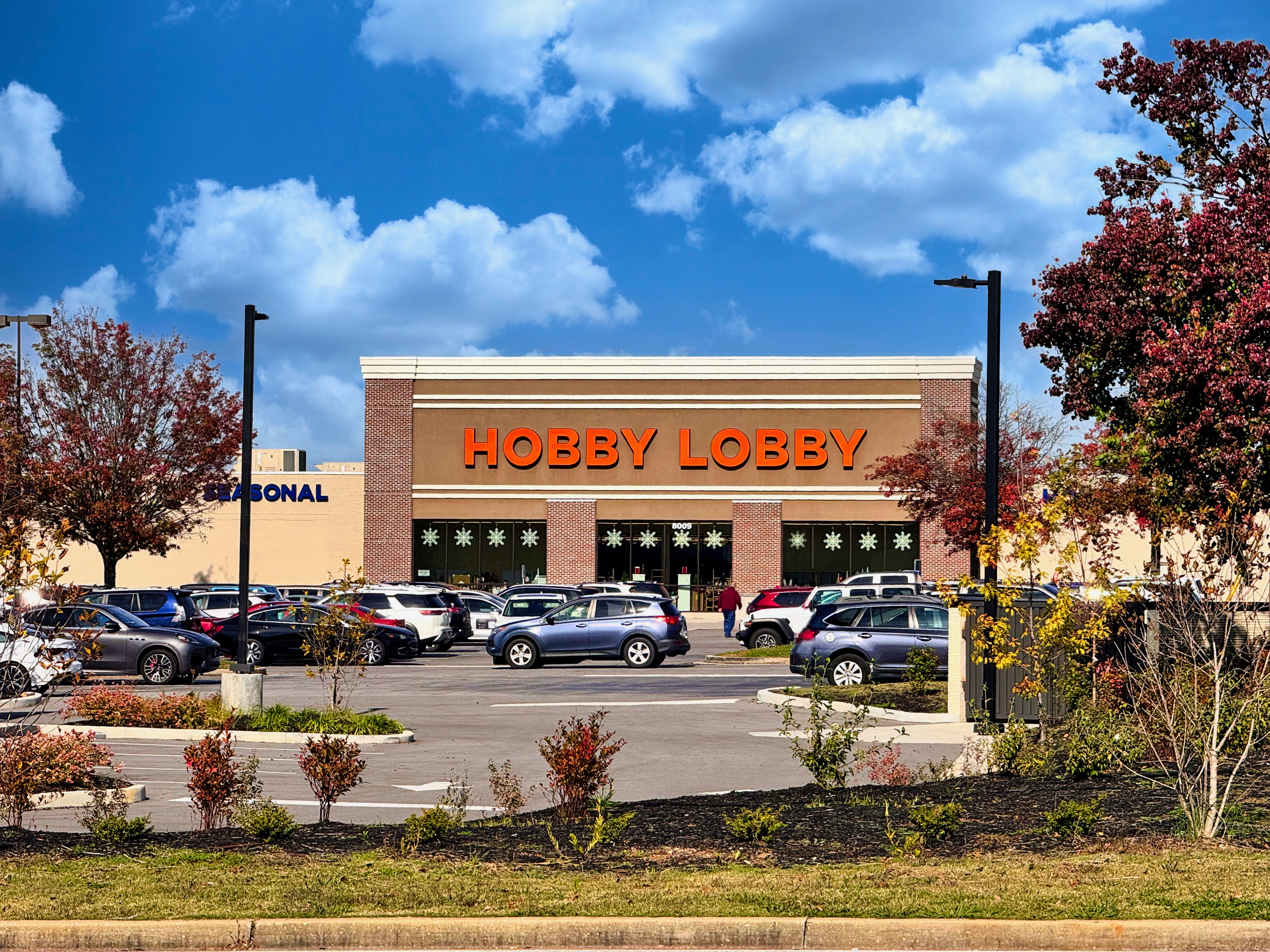
A Hobby Lobby store in Knoxville, Tennessee

As of 2025, Hobby Lobby has 1,057 stores, with locations in every state except Alaska and Hawaii.

Hobby Lobby typically seeks to rent big-box facilities, such as previously occupied supermarkets, hardware stores or Kmarts in mid- to high-income suburban areas. This allows Hobby Lobby to save 50–70 percent on an older, existing building lease as compared with constructing a new retail space, which they view as critical to their competitive advantage in the arts and crafts industry. Their stores range in size up to 90,000 square feet (8,400 m^{2}), and they draw customers from a 10–15-mile (16–24 km) radius.

Hobby Lobby is unusual among retailers in not using barcodes, with cashiers instead inputting prices manually.

Private label brands sold by Hobby Lobby include Darsee & David's, a line of candles, and Rosie and Rex, a collection of pet supplies.

== Controversies ==
The business and its owners have been the subject of controversies and scandals including accusations of antisemitism, homophobia, LGBTQ discrimination, attempts to evangelize public schools, "efforts to deny access to contraceptives for employees," "discrimination and illegally smuggled artifacts [and] endangering employees during the coronavirus pandemic."

=== Opposition to Patient Protection and Affordable Care Act ===
David Green took a public stance against the Patient Protection and Affordable Care Act, citing its mandating that companies provide access to contraception and the morning-after pill. In September 2012, Hobby Lobby filed a lawsuit against the United States over new regulations requiring health insurance provided by employers to cover emergency contraceptives.

Hobby Lobby released the following statement: "[T]he Green family's religious beliefs forbid them from participating in, providing access to, paying for, training others to engage in, or otherwise supporting abortion-causing drugs and devices". Hobby Lobby argued that the Free Exercise Clause of the First Amendment to the United States Constitution and the Religious Freedom Restoration Act serve to protect their religious beliefs, and accordingly bars the application of the contraceptive mandate to them.

The U.S. Supreme Court rejected the company's application for an injunction, prompting the firm to sue the federal government. On July 19, 2013, US District Judge Joe Heaton granted the company a temporary exemption from the contraceptive-providing mandate. On January 28, 2014, the Center for Inquiry filed an amicus brief with the Supreme Court. They argued that were the court to grant Hobby Lobby an exclusion, the firm would violate the Establishment Clause, along with part of the First Amendment. Oral arguments in the case, then known as Sebelius v. Hobby Lobby, were heard on March 25, 2014. On June 30, 2014, the U.S. Supreme Court ruled 5–4 that Hobby Lobby and other "closely held" stock corporations can choose to be exempt from the law based on religious preferences, based on the Religious Freedom Restoration Act of 1993 but not on the First Amendment to the United States Constitution.

In November 2022, The New York Times reported on a possible leak of the Hobby Lobby decision about two weeks prior to its formal announcement; this story was published following the leak and decision of Dobbs v. Jackson Women's Health Organization in June 2022 which overturned Roe v. Wade on abortion rights. Reverend Rob Schenck wrote to both Chief Justice John Roberts and to the Times stating that he had been told of which way Hobby Lobby was to be decided through a close associate after Schenck and his wife had a dinner party with Justice Samuel Alito and his wife. At the time, Schenck used that information to inform Hobby Lobby and other religious organizations to prepare for the formal announcement of the decision. Schenck had opted to reveal this information in 2022 to aid in the investigation of the Dobbs decision leak. In 2011 through their connection to the Historical Society, Hobby Lobby's owners attended a Christmas party in Supreme Court chambers shortly before litigation was initiated which became Burwell v. Hobby Lobby Stores, Inc., 573 U.S. 682 (2014).

=== Items relating to Jewish holidays ===
In September 2013, a shopper reported being told by a store employee in Marlboro, New Jersey, that Hobby Lobby did not carry merchandise celebrating Jewish holidays, as "the store did not cater to you people." David Green issued a formal apology to the Anti-Defamation League, who accepted it in a published statement. In addition, Steve Green, the son of David Green, issued a statement that the stores had carried Jewish items in the past, and would be testing the market to do so in the future. In 2017, Snopes re-examined this issue and reported the claim that Hobby Lobby was still not selling Jewish holiday merchandise was "Outdated."

=== Smuggling and collections management controversies ===
Beginning in 2009, representatives of Hobby Lobby were warned that artifacts they were purchasing might have been looted from Iraq. The purchases had been made for the Museum of the Bible, which the company was sponsoring. In early July 2017, US federal prosecutors filed a civil complaint in the Eastern District of New York under the case name United States of America v. Approximately Four Hundred Fifty Ancient Cuneiform Tablets and Approximately Three Thousand Ancient Clay Bullae. On July 5, 2017, Hobby Lobby consented to a settlement requiring forfeiture of the artifacts, the payment of a fine of $3 million, and the return of over 5500 artifacts.

In April 2020, the centerpiece of the Museum of the Bible's collection, the fragments of the Dead Sea Scrolls, were declared to be fakes. After its authenticity was questioned, the museum removed the display of a miniature bible which a NASA astronaut had purportedly carried to the moon.

Board chairman Steve Green, who is also president of the Hobby Lobby stores, also announced the museum would be returning over eleven thousand artifacts to Egypt and Iraq. The collection included thousands of papyrus scraps and ancient clay pieces. University of Manchester papyrologist Roberta Mazza stated that the Green family "poured millions on the legal and illegal antiquities market without having a clue about the history, the material features, cultural value, fragilities, and problems of the objects".

In January 2021, Green released the following statement: "We transferred control of the fine art storage facility that housed the 5,000 Egyptian items to the U.S. government as part of a voluntary administrative process. We understand the U.S. government has now delivered the papyri to Egyptian officials". That was in addition to 8000 clay objects transferred to Baghdad's Iraq Museum.

The returned items include the "Gilgamesh Dream Tablet", containing part of the Epic of Gilgamesh, discovered in Iraq in 1853, sold by the Jordanian Antiquities Association to an antiquities dealer in 2003, and sold again by Christie's auction house to Hobby Lobby in 2014, for $1.6 million. The auction house lied about how the artifact had entered the market, claiming it had been on the market in the United States for decades. In September 2019, federal authorities seized the tablet, and in May 2020, a civil complaint was filed to forfeit it. In July 2021 the U.S. District Court for the Eastern District of New York officially ordered the forfeiture of the tablet by Hobby Lobby. Acting U.S. Attorney Jacquelyn M. Kasulis, for the Eastern District of New York, stated: "This office is committed to combating the black-market sale of cultural property and the smuggling of looted artifacts". Hobby Lobby failed to follow expert advice on antiquities collecting which has resulted in multiple seizures and fines.

=== Reaction to COVID-19 pandemic ===
In late March 2020, as the COVID-19 pandemic swept the globe and state and local administrations were issuing stay-at-home orders, Hobby Lobby announced its stores would remain open. The company claimed to be an essential service as they sell fabric and school supplies. In a reversal, in April 2020, Hobby Lobby closed all stores and furloughed nearly all employees without pay, announcing that they were "ending emergency leave pay and suspending use of company provided paid time off benefits and vacation."

=== Gender non-conforming access to bathrooms at stores ===
Trans woman Meggan Sommerville won a unanimous decision in Illinois state appellate court that she has the right to use women's rooms at work on August 13, 2021. She had been an employee there for 22 years, transitioned in July 2010, was written up at work for using the women's room in early 2011 and started pursuing legal remedies in February 2013. The decision also allows her to pursue the US$220,000 in damages awarded by the Illinois Human Rights Commission.

=== "He Gets Us" campaign ===
The Green family has faced criticism for contributing millions to the Servant Foundation, which supports organizations such as the Alliance Defending Freedom and has been linked to campaigns like the "He Gets Us" Super Bowl commercials. The Servant Foundation has also been associated with legal efforts that challenge LGBTQ rights and oppose certain healthcare policies, including access to contraception on religious grounds. The Southern Poverty Law Center has categorized the Alliance Defending Freedom as a hate group.
