= Carlos Alejandro Campo =

American academic administrator

Carlos Campo
- Born: Carlos Alejandro Campo; September 5, 1958 (age 67); Miami Beach, Florida, U.S.
- Education: University of Nevada, Las Vegas (BA, MA, PhD)
- Occupation: Chief Executive Officer
- Employer: Museum of the Bible
- Spouse: Karen Campo
- Parent(s): Pupi Campo; Betty Clooney
- Relatives: Rosemary Clooney (aunt); Nick Clooney (uncle); George Clooney (cousin); Miguel Ferrer (cousin); Rafael Ferrer (cousin)

Carlos Alejandro Campo (born September 5, 1958) is an American academic administrator, who is the CEO of the Museum of the Bible in Washington, D.C.

Campo was previously the president of Ashland University in Ashland, Ohio, from July 2015 to June 2024 and of Regent University from August 2010 to October 2013. He was also an education consultant for the Bill & Melinda Gates Foundation.

== Presidential tenure ==
Campo worked with the US Department of Education to expand the university's correctional education program, and AU became one of 69 schools to be chosen to participate in the Pell Experimental Site Initiative (Pell ESI). Since that time, the program has been recognized for providing access to thousands of incarcerated individuals, and as of 2021 was among the nation's largest.

In April 2020, Campo announced pay cuts to hundreds of Ashland University faculty, including cutting his own salary by 18%. Campo identified the COVID-19 pandemic as the prompt for the pay cuts. In the spring of 2021, Campo said that those who had salaries cut would have them restored and would receive back-pay for the amount their salaries had been cut.

The faculty senate of Ashland University held a private meeting in which they held a vote of "no confidence" in current president Campo. The vote passed 34–1. The vote was called after Campo set a motion to "sunset" or cut the university's program offerings from over 70 down to 25.

In October 2020, the University's board of trustees unanimously voted to extend Campo's contract through May 31, 2024.

== Achievements and associations ==
In 2016, Campo was awarded the University of Nevada Las Vegas Alumni Association's Alumnus of the Year award.

Campo is currently on the advisory board of the Social Capital Campaign and the Museum of the Bible.

Previously, he has served on the board of E3: Elevate Early Education and continues as the Chair of the Alliance for Hispanic Education.

Campo was elected as a member of the NCAA's President's Council, and serves on their finance committee.

Campo is also a member of the 50 Club of Cleveland, and was appointed as an Ohio Commodore. He is also a member of the executive committee of the Ohio Foundation of Independent Colleges (OFIC)
