= Lipnice Bible =

- Washington, D.C., Museum of the Bible (MS 483)
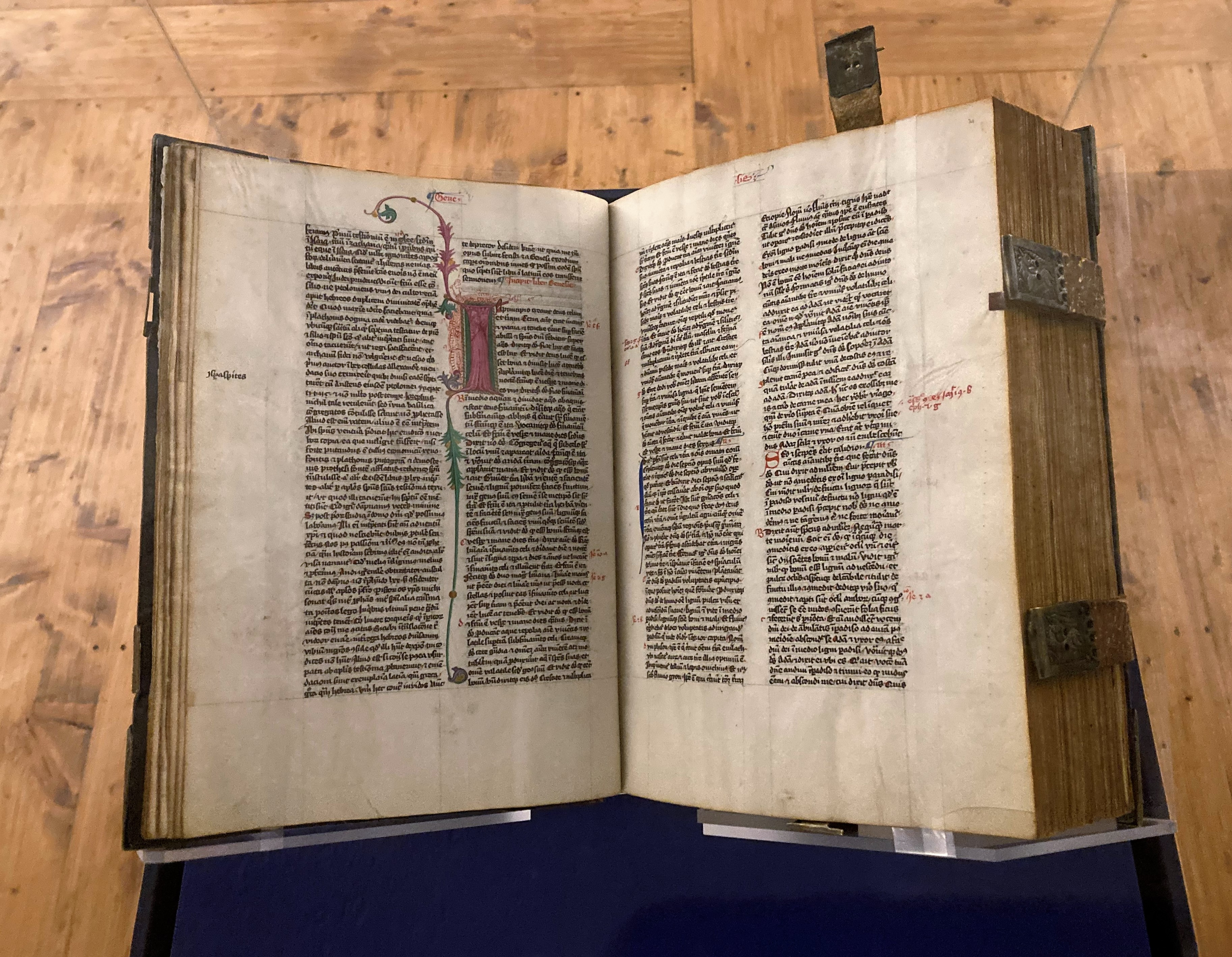
- The beginning of the Book of Genesis in the Lipnice Bible during an exhibition at Lipnice Castle in 2021
- Type: Book
- Date: 1421
- Place of origin: Lipnice nad Sázavou, Bohemia (?)
- Language: Latin
- Patron: Mathias of Roudnice (?)
- Material: Parchment
- Size: 431 leaves
- Format: 30,5 × 22 cm

The Lipnice Bible is a Latin biblical manuscript written in the first half of the 15th century in Bohemia. It was partially finished in May 1421 "in Lypnicz", very likely in Lipnice nad Sázavou. It is currently part of the collections of the Museum of the Bible in Washington, D.C.

== Description and history ==
The Lipnice Bible is written on parchment and contains 431 folios. The codex is not a mere Bible but contains a number of added texts. The decoration of the manuscript was carried out in three different phases as the codex was forced to change its location. Thus, it is a precious witness to a restless period of the Hussite Wars. The only figural illumination in the Lipnice Bible shows God as the Creator at the beginning of the book of Genesis.

Nothing is known about the first owner of the Lipnice Bible. Only his name, Mathias of Roudnice (Mathias de Rudnicze), is mentioned in the codex. Very likely he was a wealthy priest or a member of a religious community or a university who was interested in the religious disputes of his time (see the Bohemian Reformation). The place of his origin could have been Roudnice nad Labem, a town owned by the Archbishops of Prague where an important Augustinian monastery was located. Nevertheless, no evidence for the connection between the Lipnice Bible and the Augustinian Canons in Roudnice can be found.

At the end of the book of Revelation, there is a unique colophon calling the Bible “the shield of faith, with which the sons of God fight, the eye of the righteous, a stumbling block to the unbelievers”. This sentence points to a special authority that the owner attributed to the Bible.

The further history of the codex is not clear. It reappears in the 20th century in the collection of Charles William Dyson Perrins, who acquired it before 1920, but it is not known where. It changed owners several times before entering the private Green Collection in 2011, from where it was given to the Museum of the Bible. During the summer of 2021, the Lipnice Bible was exhibited in the Czech Republic.
