= St. Patrick's High School (Maysville, Kentucky) =

St. Patrick School
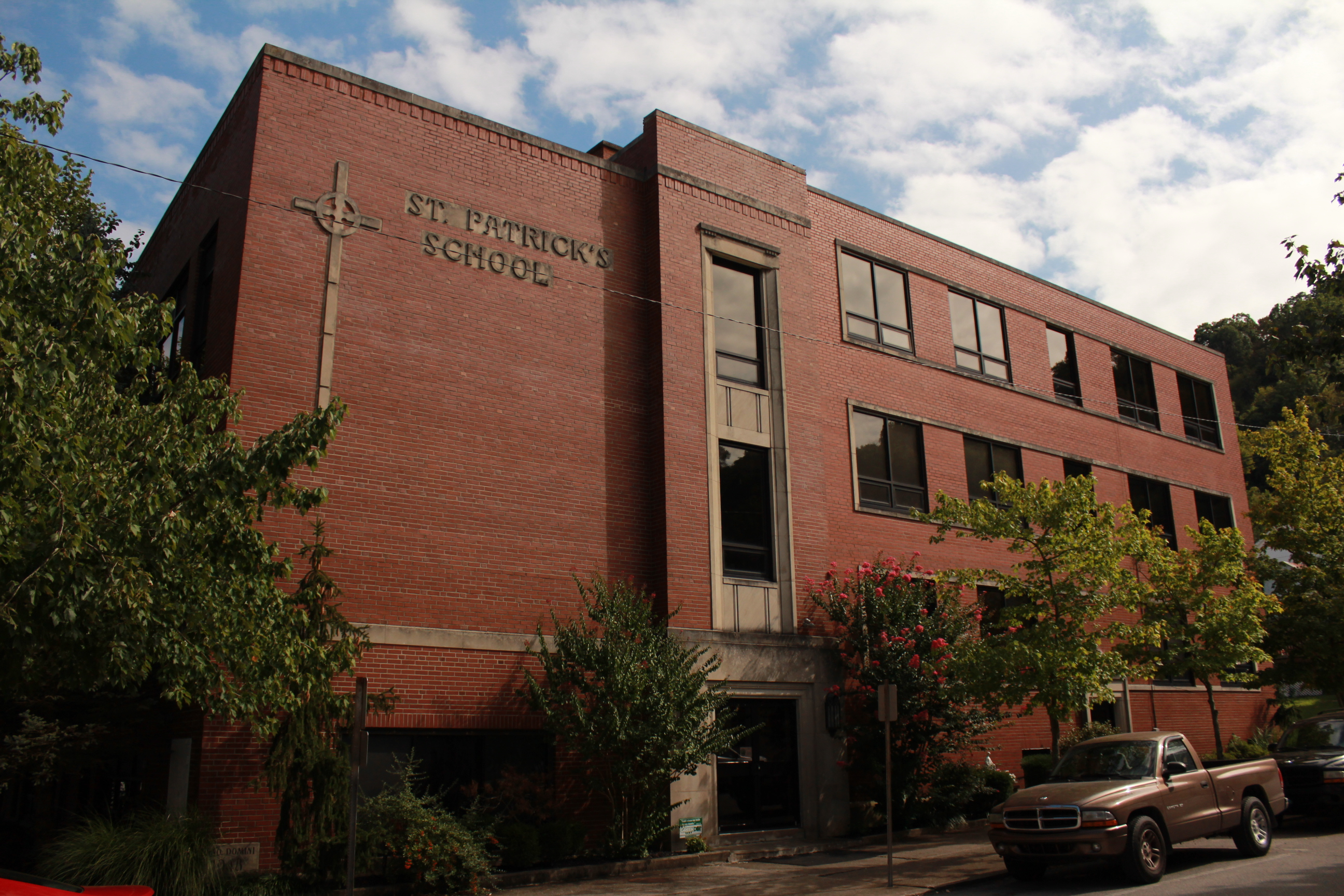
- St. Patrick High School viewed from Limestone Street

Location
- 318 Limestone Street; Maysville, (Mason County), Kentucky 41056; United States; 38°38′42″N 83°45′49″W

Information
- Type: Private, coeducational
- Religious affiliation: Roman Catholic
- Established: 1930
- School number: (606) 564-5949
- Principal: Anne Poe
- Grades: K–12
- Student to teacher ratio: 16:1
- Campus size: About 1 acre
- Colors: Kelly green and white
- Mascot: Leprechaun/Shamrock
- Team name: Saints
- Accreditation: Southern Association of Colleges and Schools
- Communities served: Kentucky (Mason, Bracken, Fleming, Robertson, Nicholas, Rowan, Lewis Counties); Ohio (Brown and Adams Counties)
- Feeder schools: St. Michael School, Ripley, OH, St. Augustine School, Augusta, KY, Maysville Academy, Maysville, KY
- Academic Dean: Shiela Clos
- Athletic Director: Angie Brant
- Website: www.stpatschool.com

St. Patrick School, or SPS, is a private, Roman Catholic school in Maysville, Kentucky, United States. It is located in the Roman Catholic Diocese of Covington. It houses grades K-12, with an average annual enrollment of approximately 140 students in elementary school and 60 in high school.

== Background ==
St. Patrick School was established in 1864. It is the only Catholic high school within a 45-mile radius.

== Notable alumni ==
- Nick Clooney — television and radio personality
- Rosemary Clooney (8th grade graduate) — actress, television and radio personality
