= Diosa Costello =

Puerto Rican entertainer, producer, club owner

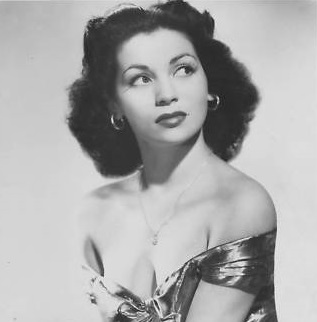
- Costello in 1943
- Born: Juana de Dios Castrello; April 23, 1913; Guayama, Puerto Rico
- Died: June 20, 2013 (aged 100); Hollywood, Florida, U.S.
- Occupations: Entertainer, performer, producer, and club owner
- Years active: 1939-1953
- Spouses: Don Casino (m. 1958; div. 1971) Pupi Campo (m. 1941; div. 1951)

Juana de Dios Castrello, better known as Diosa Costello (April 23, 1913 – June 20, 2013), was a Puerto Rican entertainer, performer, producer and club owner, often referred to as "the Latin Bombshell".

== Early life ==
Costello was born Juana de Dios Castrello y Cruz in Guayama, Puerto Rico on April 23, 1913, although 1917 is often incorrectly sourced. Costello aspired to enter show business since her childhood, but her parents opposed it due to the reputation that the business held. She defied this and began dancing and performing, earning a modest donation from a military public which was confiscated by her parents. Costello also developed other odd talents, such as contortion. Eventually, Costello's mother decided to place her in the care of an orphanage for children born to single mothers. At the age of 12, when her family migrated to Harlem, she was enrolled in a school. However, Costello started covertly working in a Latin theatre without the knowledge of her mother or the authorities.

== Career ==
Costello began performing at several locales, including the Copacabana Club. After performing for some time at various venues in Spanish Harlem, she paired with Desi Arnaz at the La Conga club. Costello debuted on Broadway in Too Many Girls (1939), which was directed by George Abbott. Costello is often erroneously cited as the first Latina to appear on the Broadway stage; however Lupe Vélez had three Broadway credits before Costello's 1939 Broadway debut. She became the first Puerto Rican vedette to co-star in Broadway. Too Many Girls was chosen to be made into a film, however, Costello decided not to go with the film because she "never liked traveling much" and stayed in New York. Her role was filled by Ann Miller, while she resumed her performances at clubs.

She also appeared on Broadway in the 1941 musical revue Crazy in the Heat. That year, she also appeared as Panchita in They Met in Argentina. In 1945, Costello appeared in The Bullfighters as "Conchita". In 1948, Costello and Arnaz reunited at La Conga. She married director Jacinto Campos. Besides New York, both would appear at Florida and the Hollywood Trocadero, before their marriage ended in divorce.

In 1951 she replaced Juanita Hall in the role of Bloody Mary in the original Broadway production of South Pacific. Despite being involved in a train crash while touring, she performed in this musical for five years. During the 1950s, she also recorded productions such as Eliseo Grenet's El Maraquero. She also made appearances in other mediums, such as The Ed Sullivan Show. In 1953, Costello made an appearance as Ameena Horn in Miss Sadie Thompson.

During the 1960s, Costello performed in Puerto Rico and made appearances in the television industry of Puerto Rico. Afterwards, Costello retired and decided to distance herself from the spotlight, declining awards and offers to leave retirement.

== Later life ==
In 1958, Costello married Don Casino. Following her retirement, she worked as a host and croupier along him at Las Vegas. Later in life Costello made infrequent appearances and relocated to Florida. The Smithsonian filmed an interview with Costello in 2006. Their Center for Latinos Initiative, houses items from her career that were donated for curation and exhibition. That same year, she attended the funeral of her niece and fellow actress Anna Navarro. She died in her sleep on June 20, 2013, at the age of 100 in Hollywood, Florida.

== Personal ==
She was married to Pupi Campo and Italian singer Don Casino.

== Filmography ==
Year	Title	Role	Notes
1941	They Met in Argentina	Panchita	
1945	The Bullfighters	Conchita	
1953	Miss Sadie Thompson	Ameena Horn	(final film role)
