= Dolní Město =

- Municipality
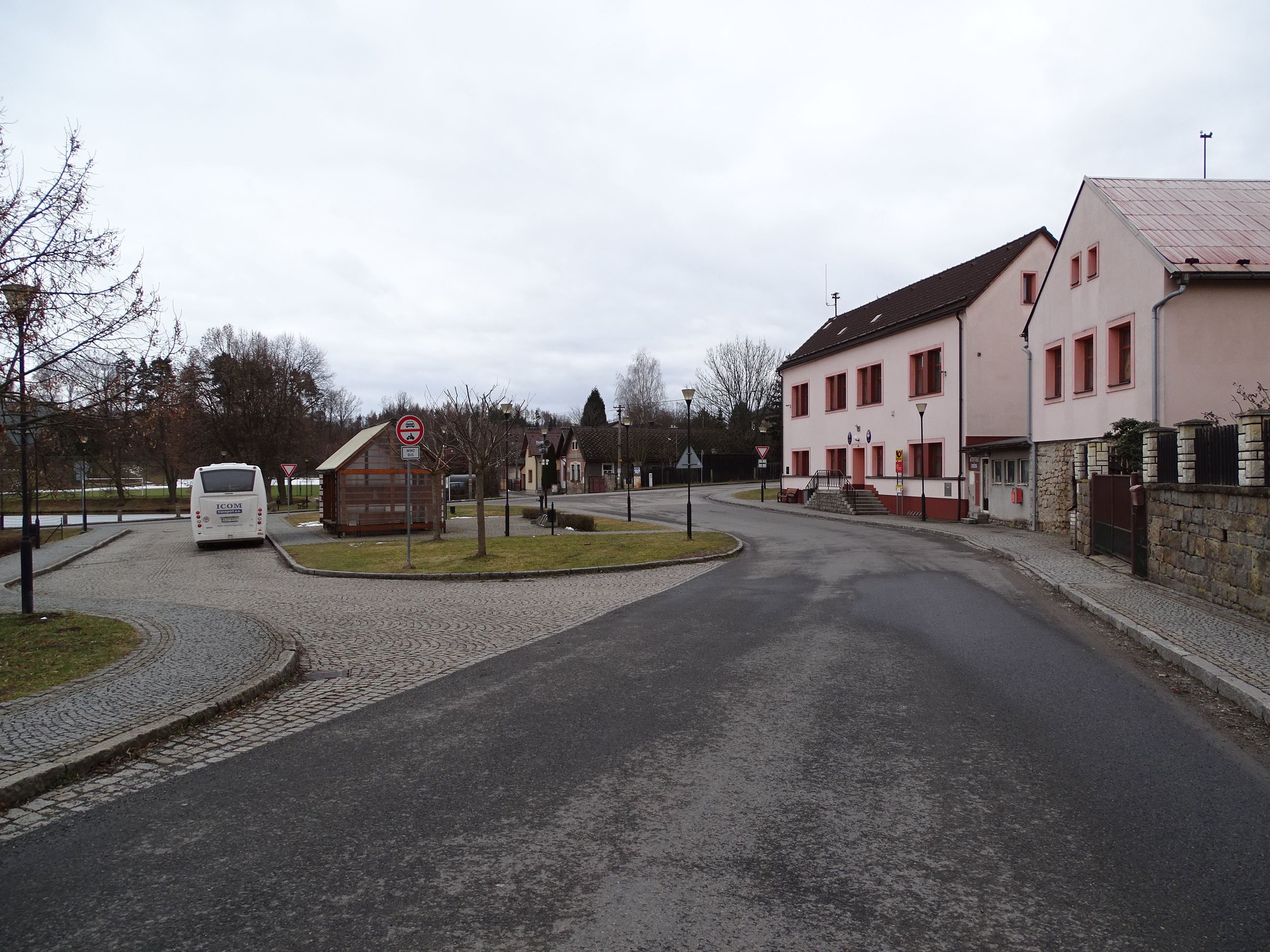
- Centre of Dolní Město

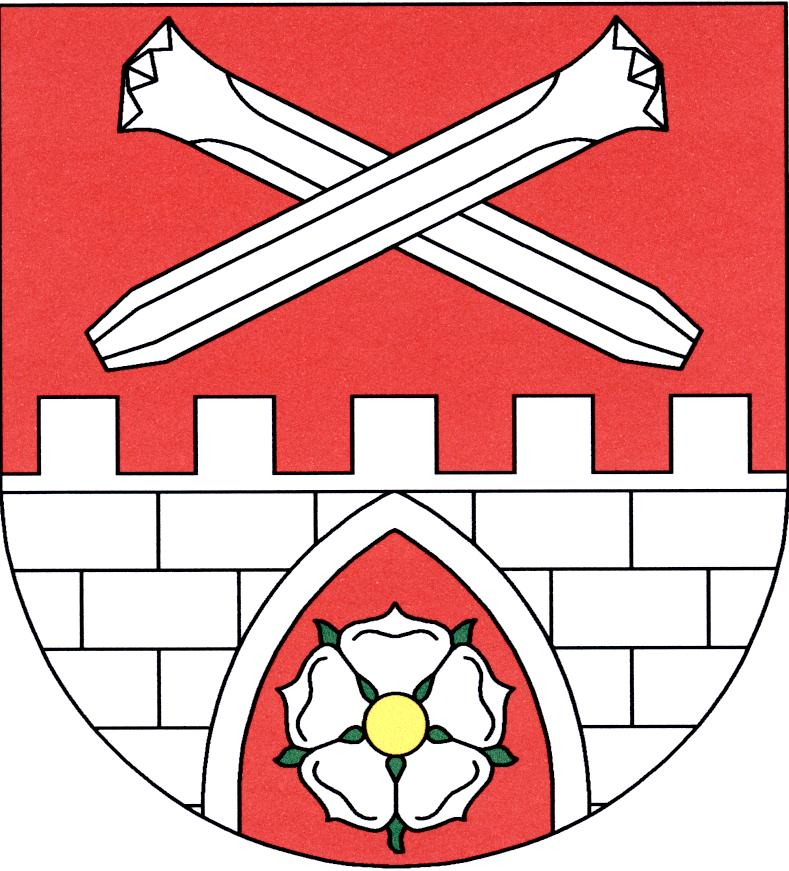
- Flag Coat of arms

- Location in the Czech Republic
- Coordinates: 49°37′40″N 15°22′56″E
- Country: Czech Republic
- Region: Vysočina
- District: Havlíčkův Brod
- First mentioned: 1226

Area
  - Total: 18.81 km^{2} (7.26 sq mi)
- Elevation: 440 m (1,440 ft)

Population (2026-01-01)
  - Total: 965
  - Density: 51.3/km^{2} (133/sq mi)
- Time zone: UTC+1 (CET)
  - Summer (DST): UTC+2 (CEST)
- Postal codes: 582 33, 582 91, 584 01
- Website: www.dolnimesto.cz

Dolní Město (Czech pronunciation: [ˈdolɲiː ˈmɲɛsto]) is a municipality and village in Havlíčkův Brod District in the Vysočina Region of the Czech Republic. It has about 1,000 inhabitants.

== Administrative division ==
Dolní Město consists of six municipal parts (in brackets population according to the 2021 census):

- Dolní Město (747)
- Dobrá Voda Lipnická (32)
- Loukov (6)
- Meziklasí (50)
- Rejčkov (63)
- Smrčensko (7)

== Etymology ==
Initially, the settlement was called Lipnice. After the Lipnice Castle was founded nearby, the settlement next to the castle became known as Horní Lipnice ('upper Lipnice'; today Lipnice nad Sázavou), and the original Lipnice was called Dolní Lipnice ('lower Lipnice'). In the late 16th century, Dolní Lipnice became known as Dolní Město (lit. 'lower town').

== Geography ==
Dolní Město is located about 14 kilometres (9 mi) west of Havlíčkův Brod and 29 km (18 mi) northwest of Jihlava. It lies mostly in the Křemešník Highlands, but the northern part of the municipality extends into the Upper Sázava Hills. The highest point is the hill Melechov at 715 m (2,346 ft) above sea level. The village is situated in the valley of the stream Pstružný potok, and several other smaller streams also flow through the municipal territory.

== History ==
The first written mention of Dolní Město (that time known as Lipnice) is from 1226. It was a market town, but due to the settlement's poor defensive position, a new castle and settlement were founded nearby in 1310, and they took the name Lipnice. The importance of Dolní Město declined, and during the Hussite Wars (1419–1434) it lost its market town status. In the following centuries, it was a village with a stagnant population.

== Demographics ==
Historical population

Year	Pop.	±%
1869	1,647	—
1880	1,520	−7.7%
1890	1,524	+0.3%
1900	1,648	+8.1%
1910	1,729	+4.9%

Year	Pop.	±%
1921	1,700	−1.7%
1930	1,637	−3.7%
1950	1,260	−23.0%
1961	1,328	+5.4%
1970	1,217	−8.4%

Year	Pop.	±%
1980	1,022	−16.0%
1991	876	−14.3%
2001	856	−2.3%
2011	890	+4.0%
2021	905	+1.7%

Source: Censuses

== Transport ==
There are no railways or major roads passing through the municipality.

== Sights ==
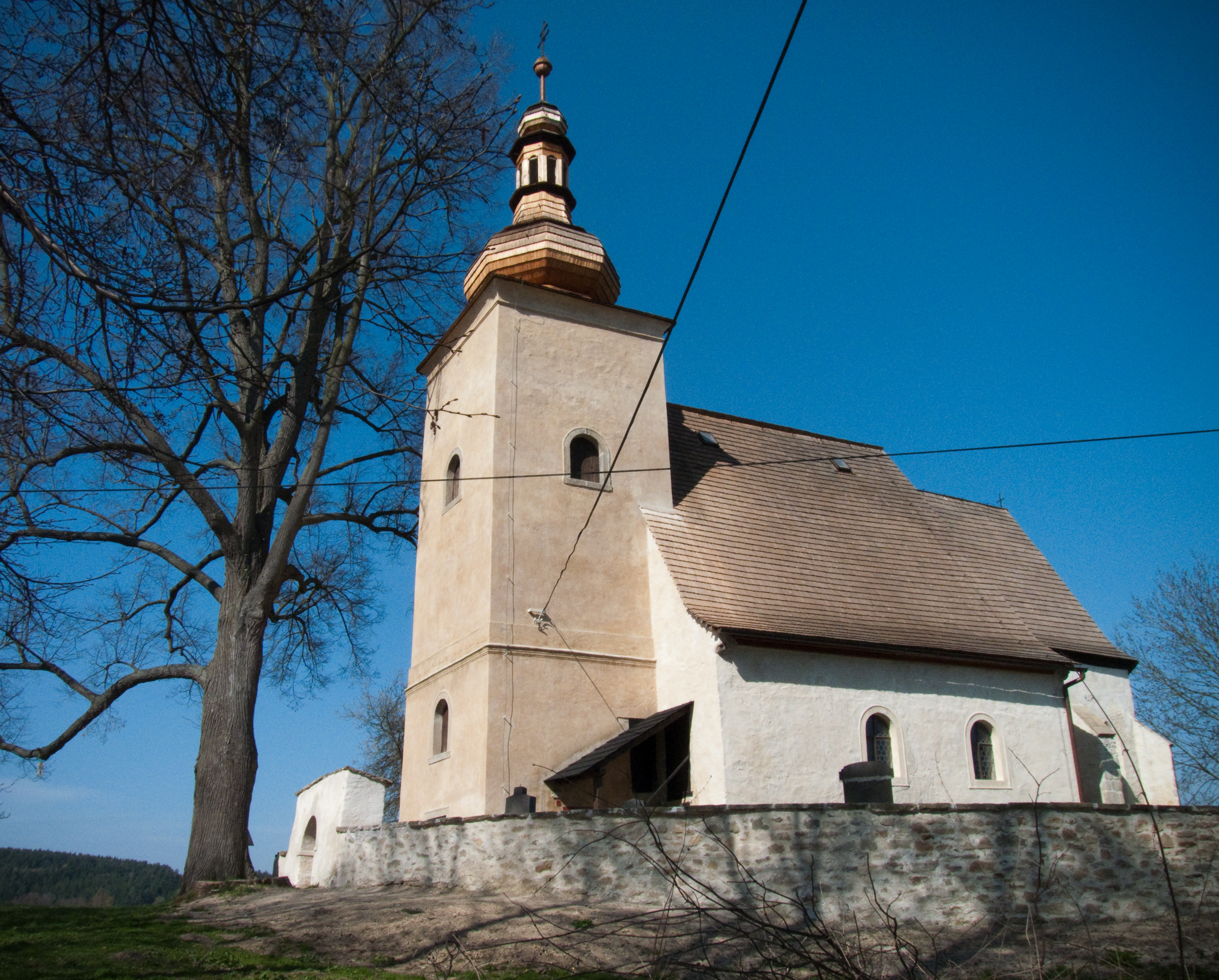
Church of Saint Margaret in Loukov

The main landmark of Dolní Město is the Church of Saint Martin. It was originally a Gothic church from the 13th century, rebuilt in the Renaissance and Baroque styles. Next to the church is a separate wooden bell tower.

The Church of Saint Margaret is located in Loukov. It is a Gothic church and its interior is decorated with rare wall paintings from the 14th century. The tower was added to the church in the 17th century.
