= Museum of the Bible =

Museum in Washington, D.C.

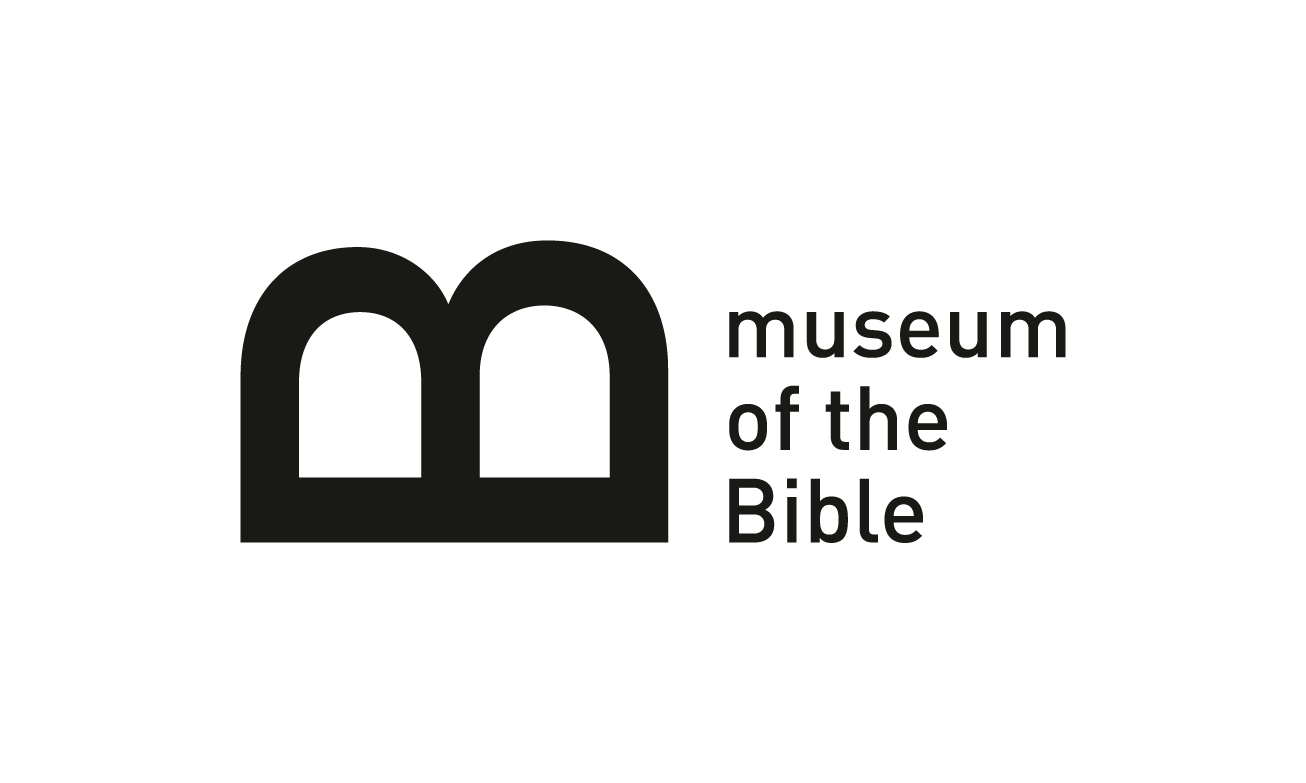

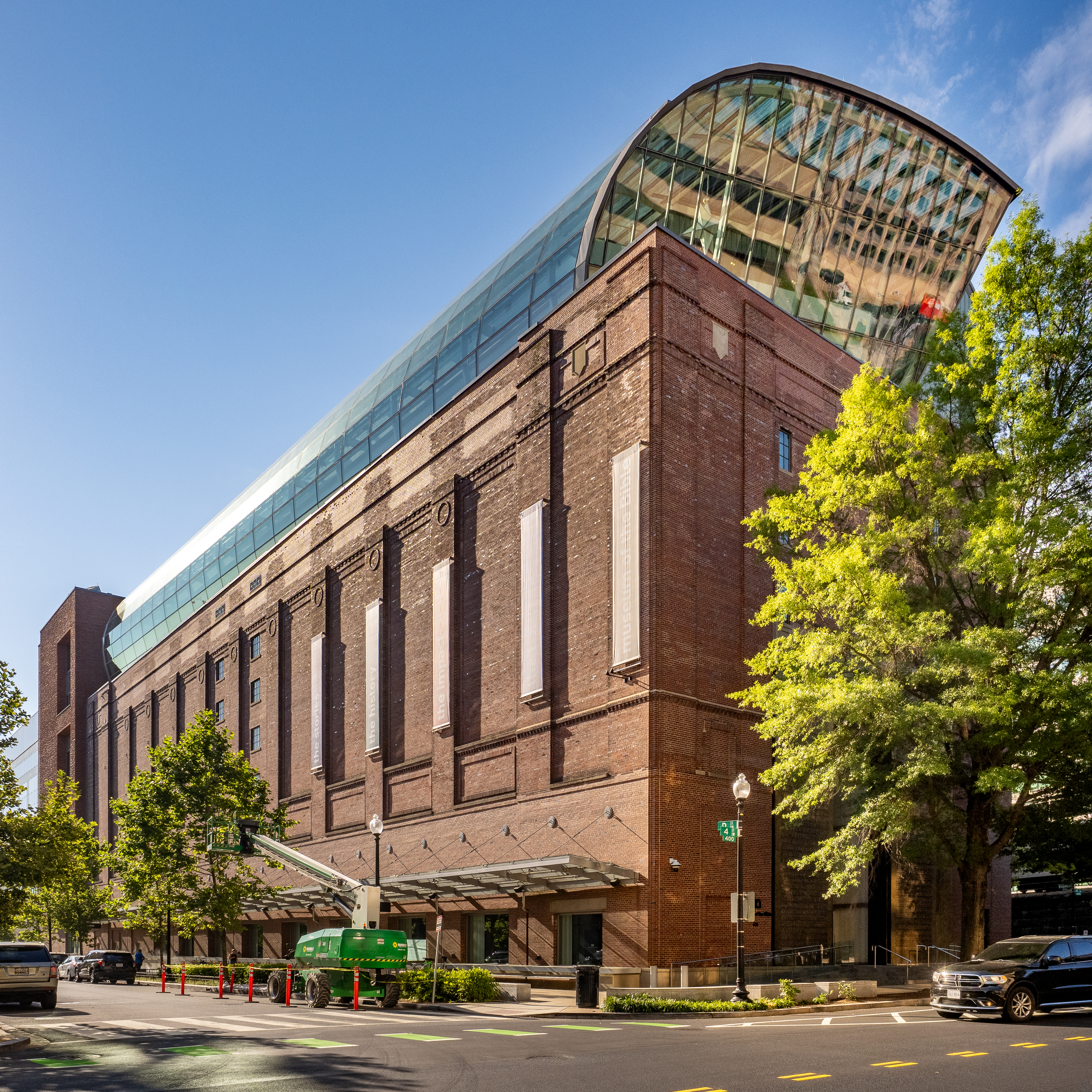
- Museum facade (2024)

- Location within Washington, D.C.
- Established: November 17, 2017
- Location: 400 4th St SW Washington, D.C., United States
- Coordinates: 38°53′05″N 77°01′01″W
- Type: History museum
- Collection size: 40,000+
- Founder: Steve Green
- CEO: Carlos Alejandro Campo
- Architect: David Greenbaum
- Public transit access: Federal Center SW
- Website: www.museumofthebible.org

The Museum of the Bible is a museum in Washington, D.C., United States, owned by Museum of the Bible, Inc., a nonprofit Christian missionary organization established in 2010 by the Green family. The museum documents the narrative, history, and impact of the Bible. The museum, which opened on November 17, 2017, exhibits around 1,500 objects and artifacts, ranging across 4,000 years of history. Carlos A. Campo has been the CEO since June 2024. The museum states that it had 453,000 guests in 2024, bringing total admissions to date past 3 million.

The museum claims that it is nonsectarian and does not engage in politics or proselytizing.However, members of the board of directors sign a "faith statement" regarding the truth of the Bible.

Prior to its opening, the acquisition of the museum collection was investigated, including a federal case over smuggled Iraqi antiquities and the provenance of various artifacts. At the dedication ceremony, the museum was granted a pontifical blessing from Pope Francis.

The Museum of the Bible charges admission and offers several dining options.

== History ==
The museum was established as a nonprofit organization in 2010.In 2012, the Green family purchased the Terminal Refrigerating and Warehousing Co. building to house the museum. Formerly the Washington Design Center, it is located two blocks from the National Mall in Washington D.C. The primary donors at the launch were Hobby Lobby and its owners, the Green family and the National Christian Foundation. Former museum president Cary Summers said that the goal is to "reacquaint the world with the book that helped make it, and let the visitor come to their own conclusions. ...We don't exist to tell people what to believe about it". The stated goal of the museum is "to bring to life the living word of God, to tell its compelling story of preservation, and to inspire confidence in the absolute authority and reliability of the Bible."

The historically protected structure, built in 1923, was renovated at the cost of $400 million. Two floors were added in addition to a rooftop café and garden. The original red brick was preserved and new bricks were imported from Denmark. The primary building was awarded historical status by the District's Historic Preservation Review Board. The glass-enclosed rooftop offers views of the United States Capitol, the Washington Monument and several Smithsonian museums. The construction efforts were led by Clark Construction. The architectural design team was led by SmithGroup.

Items from the Green Collection, owned privately by Hobby Lobby, are on show at the museum.

The museum opened on Friday, November 17, 2017 in a private ceremony in the museum theater. Pope Francis sent an official pontifical blessing . According to a message from the Vatican's Cardinal Secretary of State, Pietro Parolin, who had visited Washington earlier in the week, the Pope stated that "He is confident that those who revere the sacred scriptures as the word of God will here find nourishment for their faith, while many others will be introduced to a fascinating and vital chapter in the spiritual history of the human family". The opening was attended by Cardinal Donald Wuerl, musician CeCe Winans, Senate chaplain Barry Black, Washington, D.C. mayor Muriel Bowser, and Israeli ambassador Ron Dermer.

== Exhibits ==
The exhibits offer a scholarly perspective on the impact of the Bible in history. Bible scholar David Trobisch, former director of the museum's collections, was hired to advise on new acquisitions, identify the storylines for the museum's exhibits, and supervise a team of thirty scholars and curators. Indiana Wesleyan University professor Jerry Pattengale serves as Executive Director of Education Initiatives. The museum has an external board of advisors, and works with Jewish, Protestant, Catholic, and other religious and secular institutions.

Each of the six floors in the museum contain a different exhibit which emphasizes different aspects of the Bible's history or impact. This includes three permanent exhibit floors, each measuring 55,000 square feet (5,100 m^{2}). The first floor combines ancient artifacts with modern technology meant to immerse the participant in the Bible. The front entrance on 4th Street SW features 40-foot (12 meter) tall, 2.5 tonne (2,500 kg) bronze front doors with stained glass art containing a relief depicting the creation account in Genesis. There is also a grand lobby with a 140-foot (42 meter) LED ceiling allowing for changing visual effects and messages.

On the first floor, guests may experience a virtual reality tour of significant locations in the Bible, such as the Sea of Galilee or the Temple Mount. Guests will also find on this floor an exhibit displayed in partnership with the Vatican Museum and Library.

The second floor focuses on the Bible's impact on world culture, in areas like science, justice, and freedom. Another section is dedicated to the Bible's impact in American history. There is also a "flying" tour of Washington D.C. and the biblical references found within the city at some of its most notable landmarks.

The third floor presents the general narrative of the Bible from Abraham through the creation of Israel to the ministry of Jesus and the early church. This floor also contains a large Jewish Bible section.

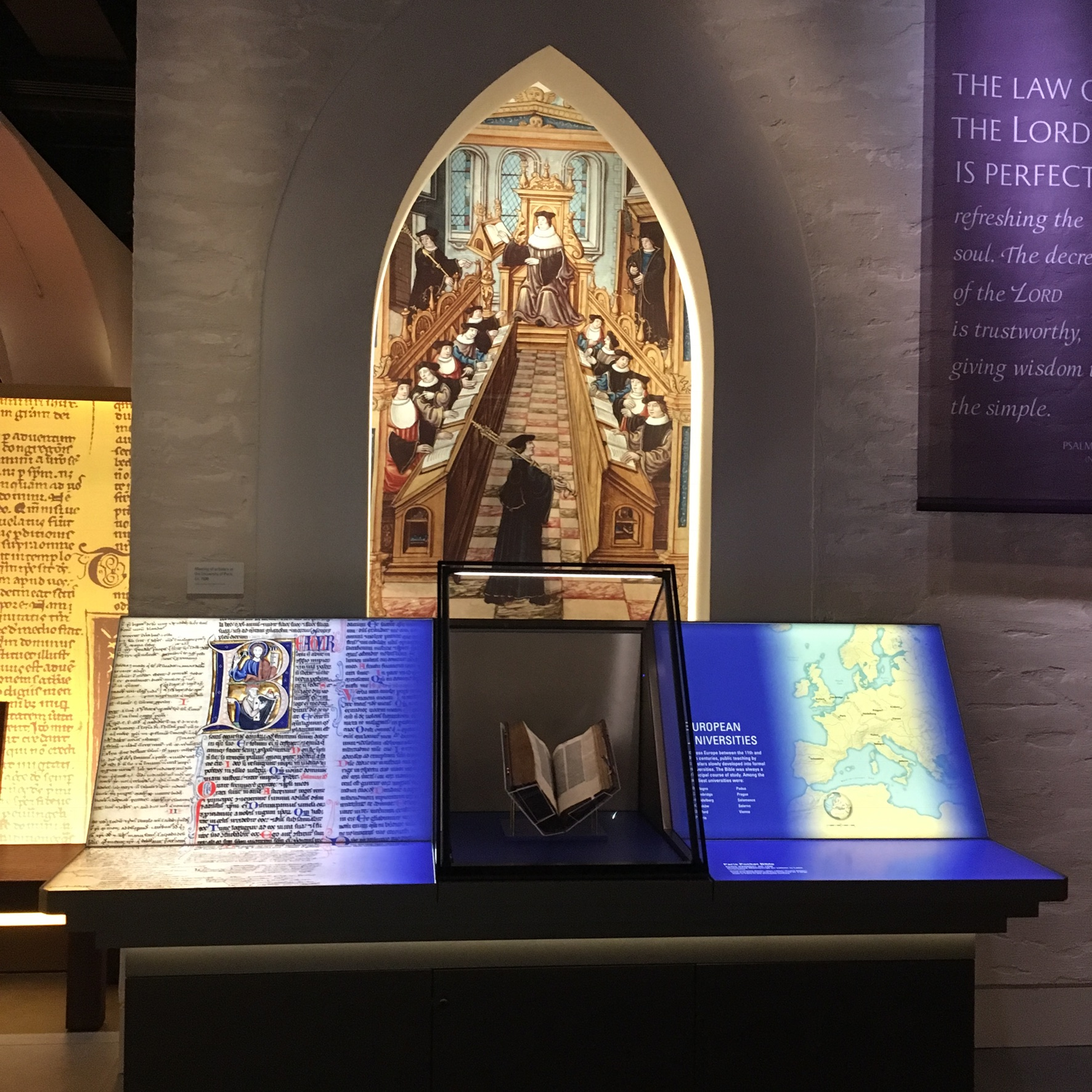
Fourth floor, Biblical history and archaeology

The fourth floor presents biblical history and archaeology. Trobisch stated that the museum "will not whitewash conflicts in Christian history but will explain the arguments that were made at the time".

The fifth level contains a performing arts theater with a 500-person amphitheater. Here, the museum sponsors scholarly lectures, as well as multimedia performances relating to the Bible. Notably, the tour of the Broadway production of Amazing Grace opened at the museum's World State Theater. The fifth floor also contains separate exhibit space for displays presented by the Israel Antiquities Authority.

The sixth floor consists of a rooftop viewing area overlooking the National Mall and U.S. Capitol, stained glass exhibits, and a ballroom that seats 1,000 guests. The museum's artifact research facility and reference library is located in a one-story addition to the roof of a neighboring office complex.

Several museum partners are responsible for the design and layout of the various exhibits. The PRD Group was responsible for the history of the Bible floor. PRD Group has previously collaborated on exhibits at Smithsonian National Museum of American History and National Museum of Natural History. BRC Imagination Arts is developing the narrative of the Bible floor. Jonathan Martin Creative recreated a Nazareth village from the first century. C&G Partners led the design of the impact of the Bible floor. Previous work by C&G Partners includes the United States Holocaust Memorial Museum and the Abraham Lincoln Presidential Library and Museum.

The museum exhibits around 1,500 objects and artifacts, ranging across 4,000 years of history. Artifacts include biblical papyri, Torah scrolls, rare printed Bibles, Jewish artifacts and contemporary treasures of Christian and Jewish culture. The museum also exhibits significant archaeological artifacts owned by collaborating institutions and private collectors such as the Israel Antiquities Authority. Steve Green has donated other ancient artifacts from his personal collection. Additional initial exhibits include remains from Julia Ward Howe's original manuscript for the famous song "The Battle Hymn of the Republic" as well as a replica of the Liberty Bell upon which is engraved the Bible verse from Leviticus "Proclaim liberty throughout all the land unto all the inhabitants thereof".

The roof of the museum features a Biblical garden, where guests can see plant varieties mentioned throughout the Bible.

In September 2024, the museum, in partnership with the Israel Antiquities Authority (IAA), opened the special exhibition, The Megiddo Mosaic: Foundations of Faith. The exhibition features a 3rd century A.D. mosaic floor discovered in northern Israel in 2003–2005 (see Megiddo Church). The Megiddo Mosaic is believed to come from one of the earliest sites of Christian worship, as well as being the earliest known inscription identifying Jesus as God. The exhibit was later relocated to Floor I of the museum and is included in the First Floor Free program from July 25, 2025 to December 31, 2026.

== Manuscript collection ==
The manuscript collection of the Museum of the Bible includes one of the Dishna Papers (3rd/4th century), the Washington Pentateuch (ca. 1000), the Hours and Psalter of Elizabeth de Bohun, Countess of Northampton (1330–1340), the Lipnice Bible (1421), a Wycliffite New Testament (first half of the 15th century), the prayer book for young Charles V (1516–1519), and many others.

=== Dead Sea Scrolls forgeries ===
Founder Steve Green donated purported Dead Sea Scrolls parchment fragments to the museum collection for its opening. When the museum catalog was released to the public, however, several outside experts expressed concern that the museum had not adequately accounted for the fragments' provenance. Arstein Justnes, a professor of biblical studies at the University of Agder in Norway, declared they were outright forgeries. The museum subsequently enlisted the German Federal Institute for Materials Research and Testing (Bundesanstalt für Materialforschung und Prüfung) to analyze the scrolls. The museum kept the fragments prominently on display for its official opening, while testing was still incomplete. The text of display stated that "scholars continue to debate the authenticity of this fragment". In 2018 the museum announced that expert examination had led it to conclude that five of the sixteen fragments of the Dead Sea Scrolls were forgeries and that the museum had removed them from display. According to the German researchers, those five showed "characteristics inconsistent with ancient origin". By March 2020, all 16 fragments displayed at the museum were confirmed to be modern forgeries. The forgeries are part of a group of about 70 fragments of the Dead Sea Scrolls which came onto the market in 2002, all of which are likely forgeries.

In her article covering the opening of the museum for ABC News, Veronica Stracqualursi recounts an interview with Christopher Rollston, a professor at George Washington University specializing on the Old Testament. Stracqualursi wrote that Rollston "said he was 'particularly pleased' that the museum chose to be 'honest' about the scrolls because museums are not generally candid about artifacts potentially being forgeries".

== Reception ==
Historians Kelly Gannon and Kimberly Wagner evaluated the museum as a "testament to the power of Evangelical impulses tempered by a desire to legitimate the Bible as a centerpiece of conversation in American life". They conclude:

There is much that makes this museum great. The design of the space is stunning and well thought out. Likewise, the impressiveness of the technology cannot be overstated [...] Finally, the collection is notable for its size and breadth [...] Yet, despite all of this, MOTB remains a confusing amalgamation of historical and biblical scholarship, Evangelical influence, and the desire to be a modern attraction. While MOTB's intent is not necessarily proselytization, its aims and purpose are often obscured by unspoken ideological and theological battles raging just under the surface. With all of the forces pulling at Museum of the Bible, it loses its sense of identity and risks becoming an Evangelical tourist attraction, though it has the potential to be much more.

At first, the museum came under criticism for the original wording of its mission, which described an Evangelistic purpose of the museum, namely, to "inspire confidence in the absolute authority and reliability of the Bible". A later statement shifted away from that language. A revised 2013 mission statement reads, "We exist to invite all people to engage with the Bible. We invite Biblical exploration through museum exhibits and scholarly pursuits."

As of 2022, the mission statement reads "Museum of the Bible is a global, innovative, educational institution whose purpose is to invite all people to engage with the transformative power of the Bible."

Lawrence Schiffman, an authority on the Dead Sea Scrolls and professor of Hebrew and Jewish studies at New York University, stated, with respect to the Museum of the Bible:

The overarching narrative is the impact of the Bible [...] its own internal history of how it came together, spread and was passed on. It exudes one of the best things about art culture in this country. Protestant, Catholic, Jewish, Ethiopic, Orthodox – all of them are here. There's a message of shared culture and respect that the museum exudes. Everyone who comes here is going to go out with that message.

With its many engaging and interactive elements, the Museum of the Bible has been described by Philip Kennicott as "a new standard for how this country's museums fuse entertainment and education". He went on to say that the Museum creates for its guests a "cultural experience", bringing together "history, art, architecture, theater, and music".

John Knutsen, assistant director of the St. Thomas More Institute and coordinator for evangelization and adult faith formation, wrote a review of the museum for The Catholic Herald. Knutsen wrote "Far from offering a shallow presentation, the Museum of the Bible is cultured, erudite, and remarkably diverse."

In contrast to these comments, Biblical scholars Joel Baden of Yale Divinity School and Candida Moss of University of Birmingham, who wrote the book Bible Nation: The United States of Hobby Lobby, expressed concerns about the museum's mission, saying, "They have misled the public at large by promoting a curriculum and a museum that tell only the story that the Greens want to tell, without acknowledging that scholars and experts have spent decades, indeed centuries, laboring to provide very different accounts of the Bible and its history."

After spending many hours while writing the book with museum founder Steve Green and president Cary Summers, they concluded:

It's not really a museum of the Bible, it's a museum of American Protestantism. Their whole purpose is to show this country as a Christian country governed by Christian morality.

— Candida Moss

Their three-minute promo is fascinating demonstration of this problem. At least half of it is a reenactment of American history which has no bearing on the Bible – the signing of the Declaration of Independence, for example, or the Revolutionary War. The worry is that the museum portrays a story of the Bible that culminates in Protestantism and America. (Baden)

In contrast, Christopher Rollston, a professor at George Washington University and expert on the Old Testament, was pleased with the museum's efforts "to be quite historical in the wordings of the displays that they have", adding that "they have made it clear that they're willing to listen to scholars' critiques."

John Fea, associate professor of American history at Messiah College, and chair of the history department, said, "It's hard to see this as anything other than an attempt to try to bring Christian values in the Bible's teachings as understood by Evangelical Protestants, like the Greens, into the center of American political life and American cultural life." However, the Catholic theologian Thomas L. McDonald, writing in the National Catholic Register praised the abundance of material dedicated to the history of the Bible with respect to Catholicism:

In 2012, the museum brought its traveling Verbum Domini exhibit to the Vatican, which helped forge relationships with the Vatican Museums and Vatican Library. A similar exhibit was mounted in Philadelphia during the visit of Pope Francis, continuing the museum's process of courting Catholic leaders and press. The result is a permanent space on the first floor of the museum for rotating exhibits from the Vatican [...] Pre-Reformation books and illuminated manuscripts, displays of Catholic architecture and art, the role of monks and nuns, and discussions of Catholic saints and scholars are all in the mix.

A blog article in The Economist criticized the Museum of the Bible for focusing on Protestant, Jewish and Roman Catholic views, but ignoring the views of Eastern Orthodox Christianity and not mentioning the impact of the Bible on Islam or taking into account the opinions of scholars who do not consider that the Bible contains a coherent story. Biblical scholars have also accused the Museum of the Bible as "normalizing a Bible that authorizes white evangelical dominion".

The Museum was the topic of a six-part BBC Radio 4 program and podcast Word of God within the Intrigue series, first broadcast in February and March 2025; it was presented by Ben Lewis and featured papyrologist Roberta Mazza.

== Controversies ==
=== Hobby Lobby smuggling scandal ===
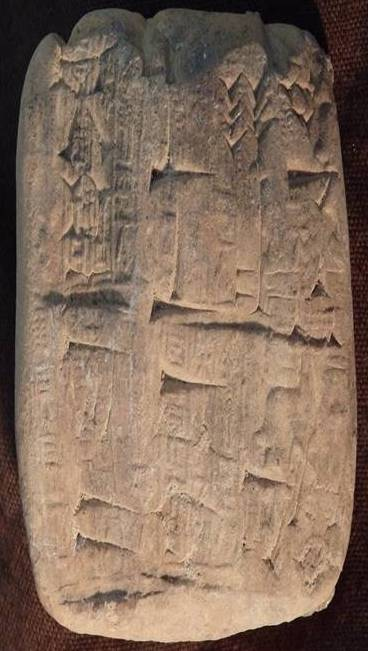
One of the ancient clay tablets showing Cuneiform script which Hobby Lobby smuggled

Shipments of artifacts imported by Hobby Lobby in 2010 and 2011 were seized by US customs agents. The artifacts, largely clay bullae and cuneiform tablets from ancient Iraq, had in some cases been declared as "tile samples". Federal investigation culminated in a 2017 civil forfeiture action United States of America v. Approximately Four Hundred Fifty Ancient Cuneiform Tablets and Approximately Three Thousand Ancient Clay Bullae, after which Hobby Lobby agreed to forfeit and return more than 5,500 artifacts, and to pay of a fine of $3 million. The artifacts in question had likely been looted from Iraq.

Hobby Lobby was found to have used couriers that had willfully used methods to conceal the provenance of the allegedly stolen items. The museum released a statement that these artifacts were never owned by the Museum of the Bible and were never intended to be part of their collection. In 2018, the items were returned to Iraq, and the company paid a $3 million fine.

Scott Thumma, a dean and professor of sociology of religion at Hartford Seminary, defended Hobby Lobby during the smuggling controversy. Thuma stated: "Many of the collections of our great national museums and universities are full of the very objects that Hobby Lobby is being fined for smuggling and are seldom required to return or pay compensation."

In October 2019, officials from the British Egypt Exploration Society, a nonprofit organization that manages the Papyri Project, alleged that Oxford academic Dirk Obbink engaged in the theft and sale of "at least 11 ancient Bible fragments to the Green family, the Hobby Lobby owners who operate a Bible museum and charitable organization in Washington". The museum said it will return the fragments to the Egypt Exploration Society and Oxford University.

The Museum of the Bible's board chairman, Steve Green, who is also president of the Hobby Lobby stores, announced the museum will be returning over eleven thousand artifacts to Egypt and Iraq. The collection includes thousands of papyrus scraps and ancient clay pieces. Green admitted, "I knew little about the world of collecting ... The criticism of the museum resulting from my mistakes was justified." Manchester University papyrologist Roberta Mazza stated that the Green family "poured millions on the legal and illegal antiquities market without having a clue about the history, the material features, cultural value, fragilities, and problems of the objects".

This return includes the "Gilgamesh Dream Tablet", containing part of the Epic of Gilgamesh, which was discovered in Iraq in 1853, sold by the Jordanian Antiquities Association to an antiquities dealer in 2003, and sold again by an auction house to Hobby Lobby in 2014 for $1.6 million. The auction house lied about how the artifact had entered the market, claiming it had been on the market in the United States for decades. In September 2019, federal authorities seized the tablet, and in May 2020, a civil complaint was filed to forfeit it. In July 2021 the United States Department of Justice announced it had seized the Gilgamesh tablet from Hobby Lobby for repatriation to Iraq. Acting U.S. Attorney Jacquelyn M. Kasulis for the Eastern District of New York stated, "This office is committed to combating the black-market sale of cultural property and the smuggling of looted artifacts." Hobby Lobby failed to follow expert advice on antiquities collecting which has resulted in multiple seizures and fines.

=== Racial profiling lawsuit ===
In January 2018, security guards at the museum noticed a bearded, Middle Eastern man sitting on a bench outside the museum. They then detained and interrogated him for 20 to 25 minutes, telling him that he was suspicious because of where he was sitting. The man was Romany Erian Hetta, a Coptic Christian asylum seeker who was waiting for a friend. Hetta insisted that he was Christian, but the guards did not believe him, questioning him on his denomination and whether it was Christian. One guard unpromptedly told him that they were "not racially profiling" him. After allowing him to leave, they prepared a dossier on him and sent it to the FBI, advising them that Hetta was a "possible terrorist, security and/or criminal threat", partially due to his name. In response, the FBI opened a counterterrorism investigation of Hetta, questioning his landlord and housemate until Hetta agreed to be questioned to clear his name. Hetta sued the museum, alleging racial profiling and false imprisonment. The case generated criticism of the museum, with Hetta's lawyer Mara Verheyden-Hilliard stating "The Museum's conduct in this case begs the question: would the Museum of the Bible have racially profiled Jesus?"

== Gallery ==
Museum of the Bible
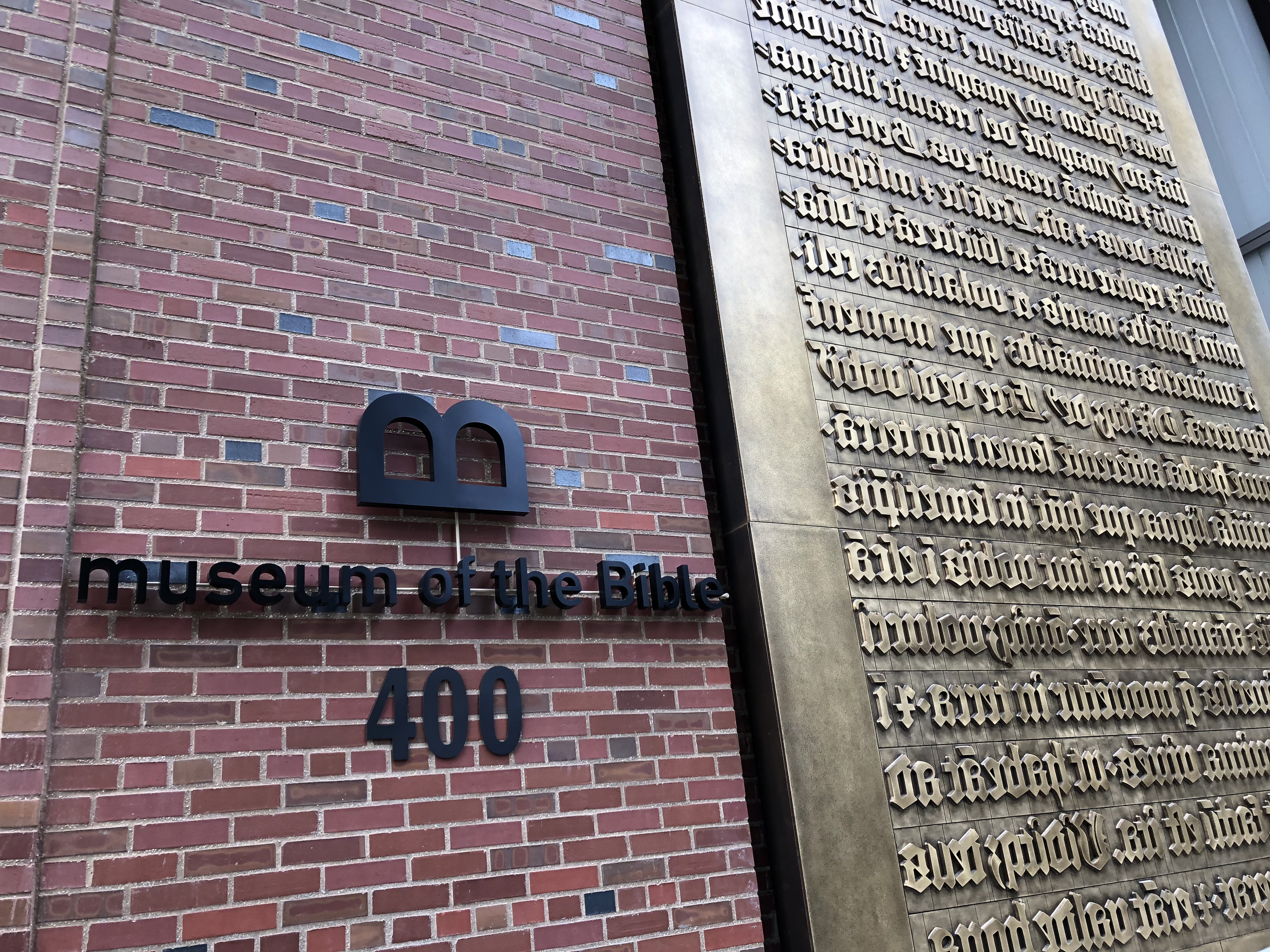
Detail of museum plaque

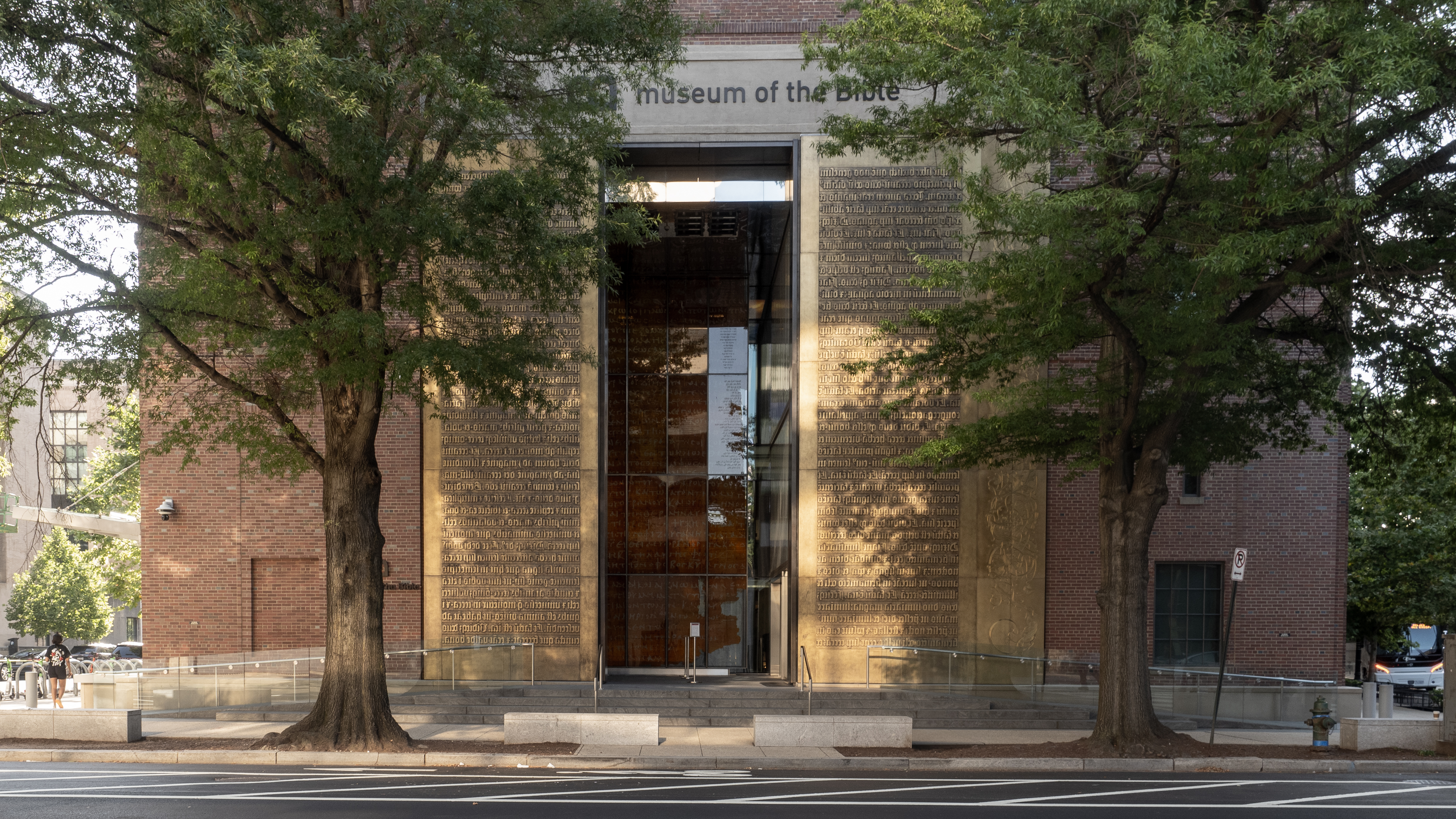
Front entrance

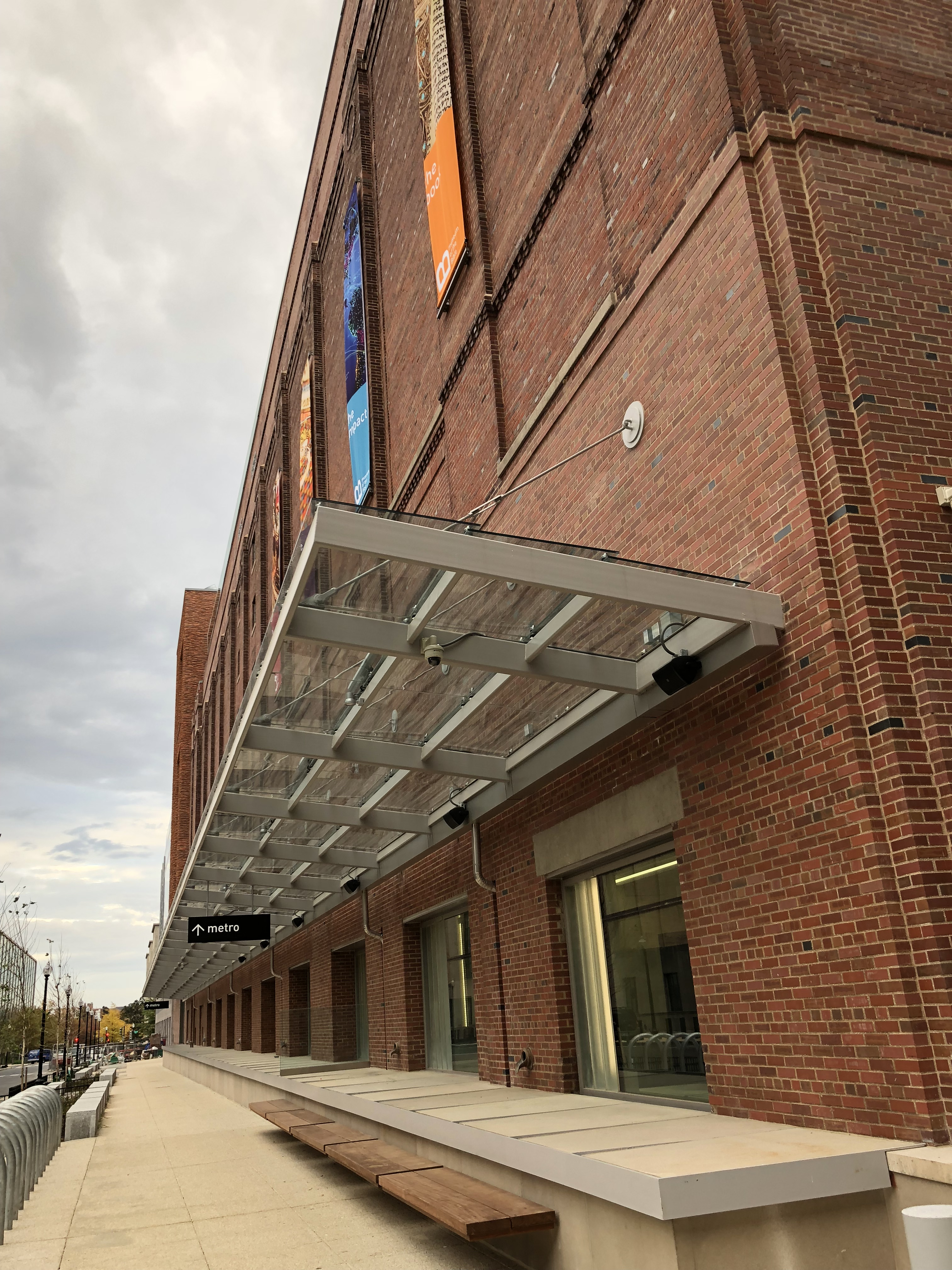
Street level view

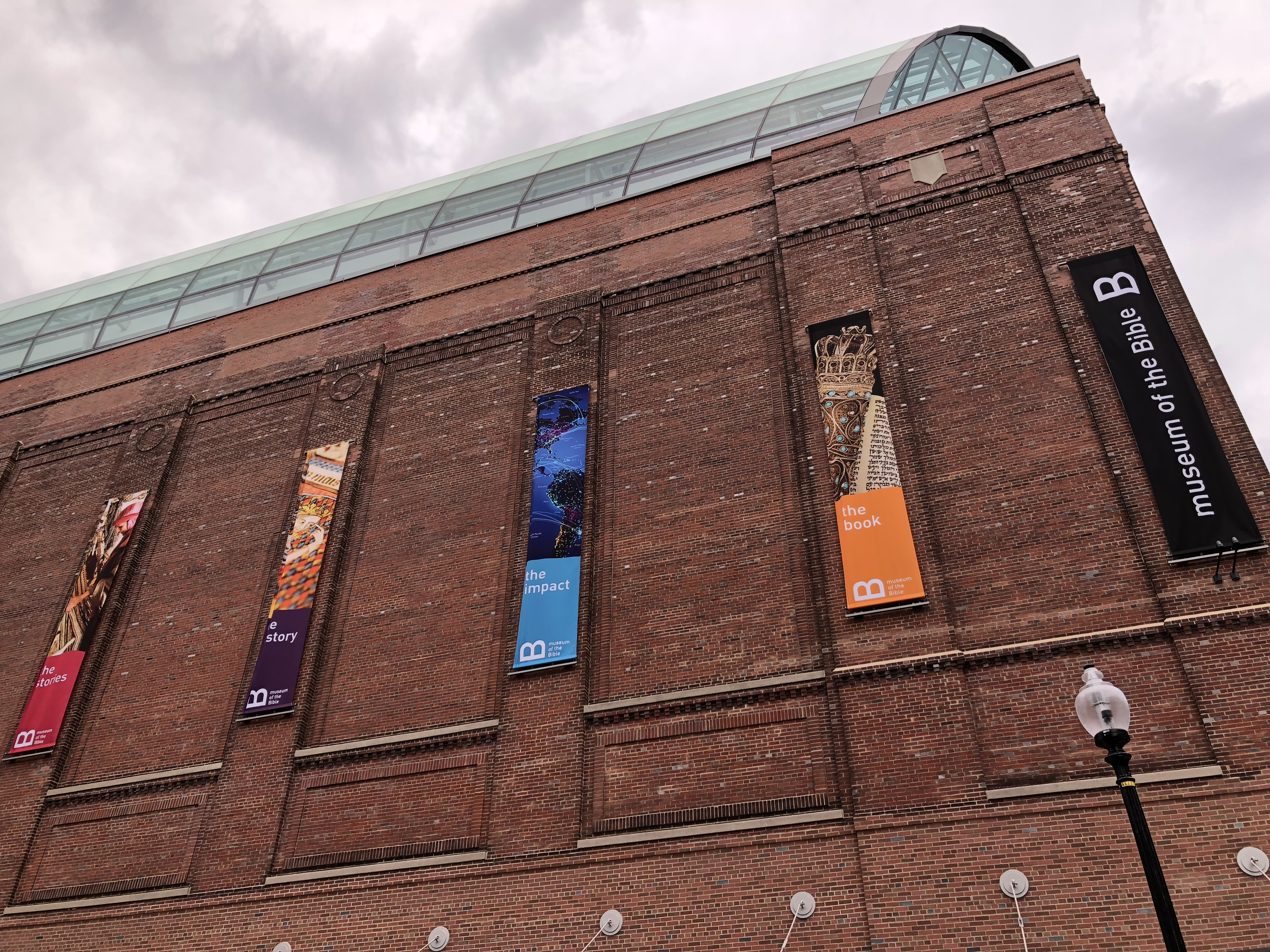
Exterior wall
