= Pupi Campo =

Cuban musician and dancer (1920–2011)

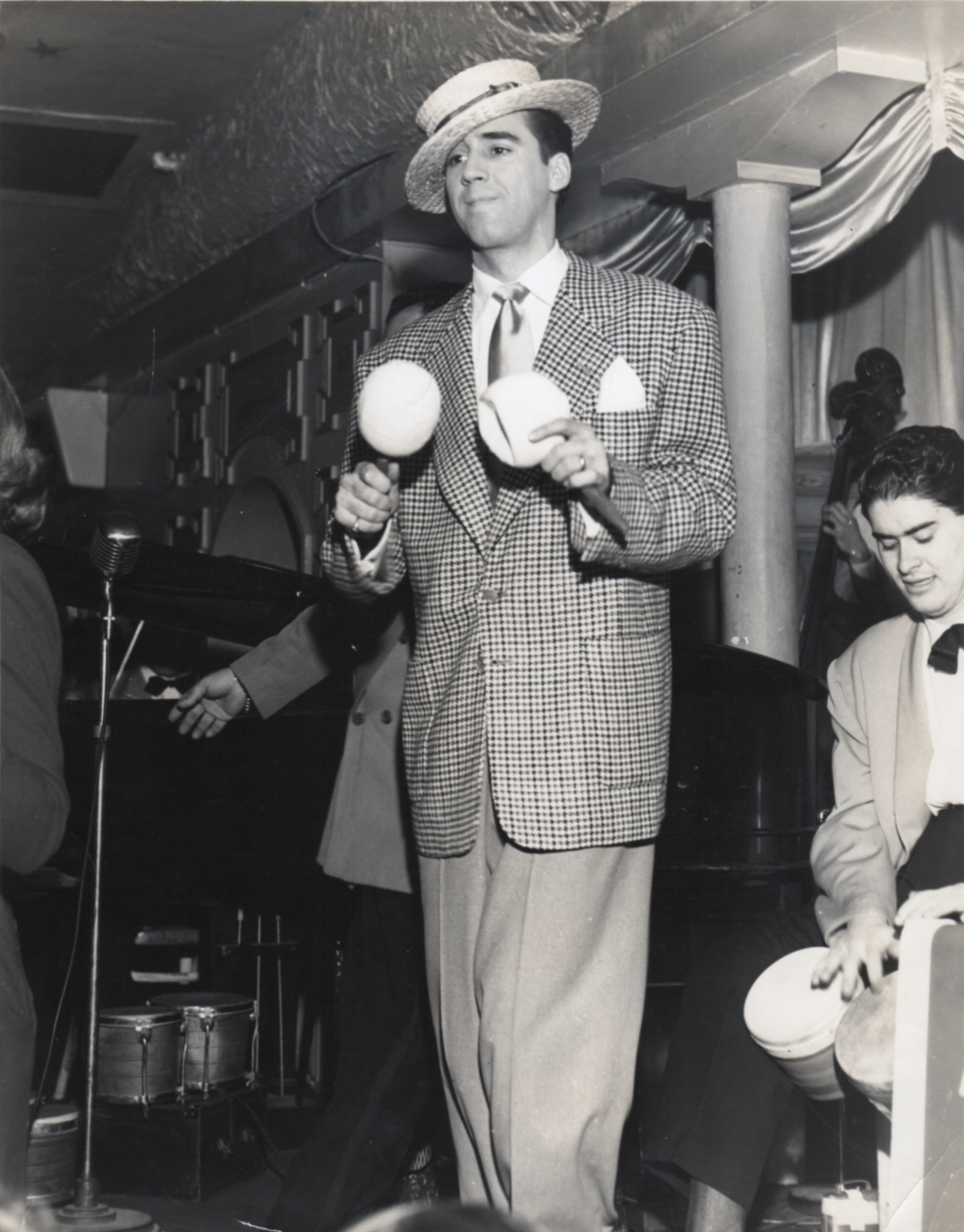
- Pupi Campo in 1942

Background information
- Born: Jacinto Campo; May 1, 1920; Havana, Cuba
- Died: December 12, 2011 (aged 91) Las Vegas, Nevada, U.S.
- Occupations: Singer, dancer, bandleader
- Years active: 1940s–1970s
- Labels: Seeco, Tico
- Spouses: Diosa Costello; Betty Clooney; Joette Renee Irk

Jacinto "Pupi" Campo (May 1, 1920 – December 12, 2011) was a Cuban entertainer, dancer, and bandleader who spent most of his life in the United States. As a bandleader in the 1940s and 1950s, he made recordings for labels such as Seeco and Tico. His band featured percussionist and musical director Tito Puente and pianist Joe Loco.

== Career ==
Starting as a dancer to a band at the Eden Concert nightclub, he eventually fronted his own band, which appeared on Jack Paar's Morning Show on American television from 1954 to 1956. Later he was dubbed "the rumba maestro" by the New York Daily Mirror. In 1970 he moved to Las Vegas, where he set up the jazz club "Cleopatra's Barge", inside Caesars Palace.

Two future Latin music stars, Tito Puente and Joe Loco, played with the Pupi Campo Orchestra in the late 1940s. Tito Puente was the orchestra's musical director for two years. In the 1970s, when Cachao moved to Las Vegas, he played in Pupi Campo's band, among others.

== Personal life and death ==
Pupi Campo was born in Havana to Jacinto and Dolores Trujillo Campillo and named Jacinto Campillo. Pupi Campo was married three times: to "Latin bombshell" actress Diosa Costello, to singer Betty Clooney (sister of Rosemary Clooney) and to Joette Renee Irk.

He died in Las Vegas and was survived by a son, Carlos Alejandro Campo, and three daughters from his marriage to Betty Clooney; also a sister, 11 grandchildren, and five great-grandchildren.

== Partial discography ==
- Mambo Americana Vol. 1 (7-inch EP, unknown date), Coral Records, EC 81093
- Cuban Rhumbas And Mambos (10-inch album, 1955), Vogue France, LD 126
- (with Miguelito Cuba and His Orchestra) 12 Cha-Chas And Merengues (LP, 1956), Hollywood Records, LPH 23
- Latin Dance Party – Volume 5 (LP, 1957), Seeco, SCLP-9084
- Cuban Rhumbas and Mambos (10-inch album, year unknown), Seeco SLP 2
- Rhumbas and Mambos (CD, 1991), Tumbao Cuban Classics, TCD-007
