= Meziklasí =

- Village
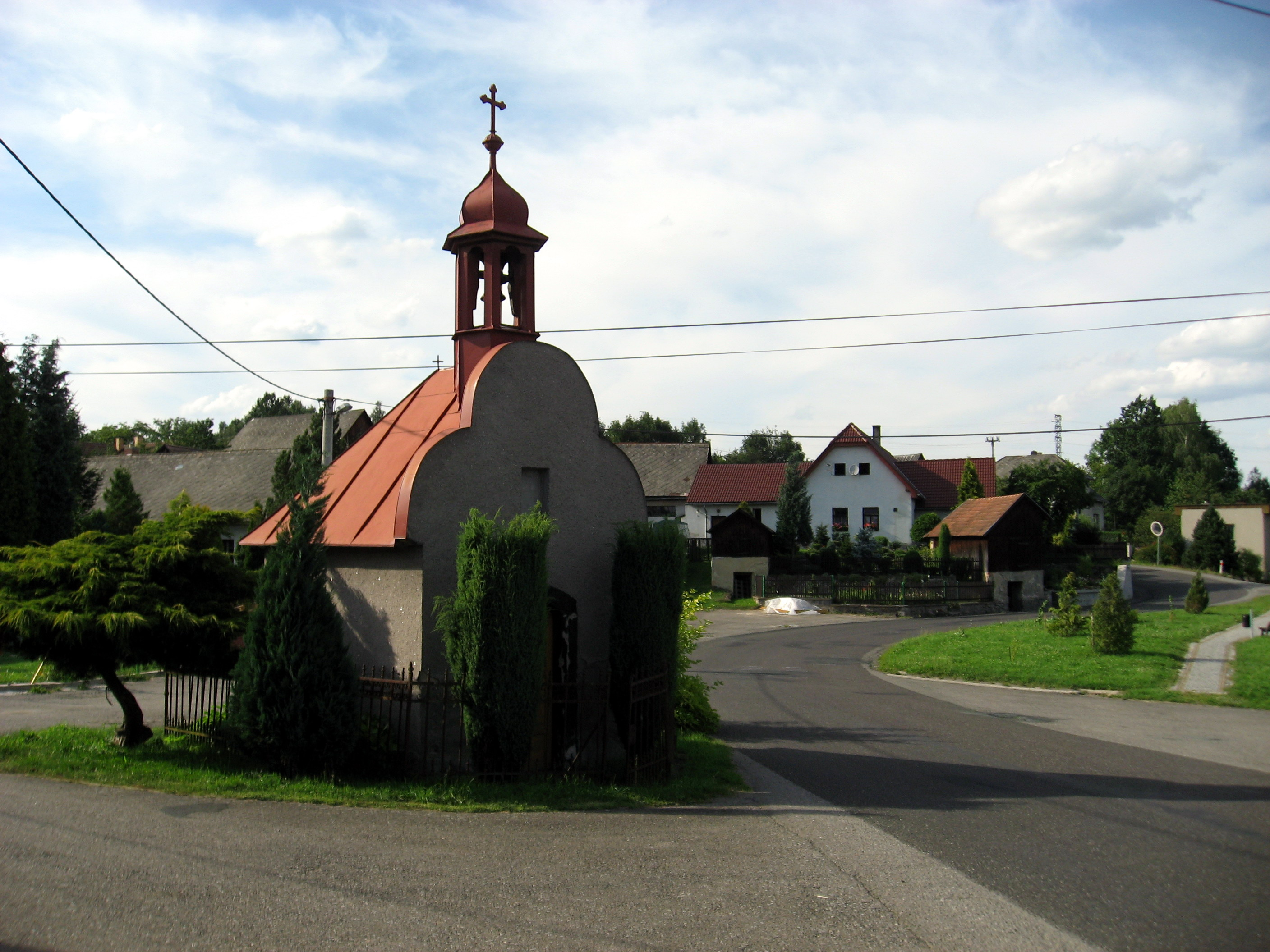
- Chapel in the centre of Meziklasí

- Location in the Czech Republic
- Coordinates: 49°38′25″N 15°21′15″E
- Country: Czech Republic
- Region: Vysočina
- District: Havlíčkův Brod
- Municipality: Dolní Město
- First mentioned: 1414

Area
  - Total: 2.32 km^{2} (0.90 sq mi)
- Elevation: 452 m (1,483 ft)

Population (2021)
  - Total: 50
  - Density: 22/km^{2} (56/sq mi)
- Time zone: UTC+1 (CET)
  - Summer (DST): UTC+2 (CEST)
- Postal code: 582 91

Meziklasí is a village and administrative part of Dolní Město in Havlíčkův Brod District in the Vysočina Region of the Czech Republic. It has about 50 inhabitants.
