= Karel Čáslavský =

Karel Čáslavský (28 January 1937 in Lipnice nad Sázavou – 2 January 2013 in Prague) was a Czech film historian and television host. Čáslavský worked as a historian for the National Film Archive (Národní filmový archiv) of the Czech Republic (and Czechoslovakia) from 1963 until his death in 2013.

Čáslavský created and hosted several television shows including the long-running In Search of Lost Time, which aired on Czech TV for more than twenty years. In the series, In Search of Lost Time, Čáslavský presented, discussed and aired archival films. Čáslavský also authored a two volume biography series on Czech and Czechoslovak film actors.

Čáslavský died in Prague on 2 January 2013, at the age of 75.
