= Joe Loco =

American Latin jazz and pop pianist (1921–1988)

José Estevez Jr. (March 26, 1921 – March 7, 1988), professionally known as Joe Loco, was a Latin jazz and Latin pop pianist and arranger of Puerto Rican ancestry who was born in New York City.

== Life ==
Loco, maybe born José Estevez Jr. but officially known as Joseph Esteves, first played with an ensemble called Montecino's Happy Boys in 1938. In the early 1940s, he served as Machito's pianist before joining the Air Force from 1945 to 1947. He then freelanced with many of the top Latin ensembles of the time well into the 1950s, working with Polito Galíndez, Marcelino Guerra, Pupi Campo, and Julio Andino. He scored a hit of his own in 1952 with the tune "Tenderly". Loco also did Latin arrangements of pop standards, and performed them with a quintet in many jazz venues that did not typically showcase Latin music.

== Discography ==
- El Baión (Tico, 1954)
- Loco Motion (Columbia 760, 1955)
- ¡Vaya! With Joe Loco (Columbia 827, 1956)
- Joe Loco in the Philippines (Villar, 1961)

== See also ==
- List of Puerto Ricans
