= Lipnice nad Sázavou =

- Town
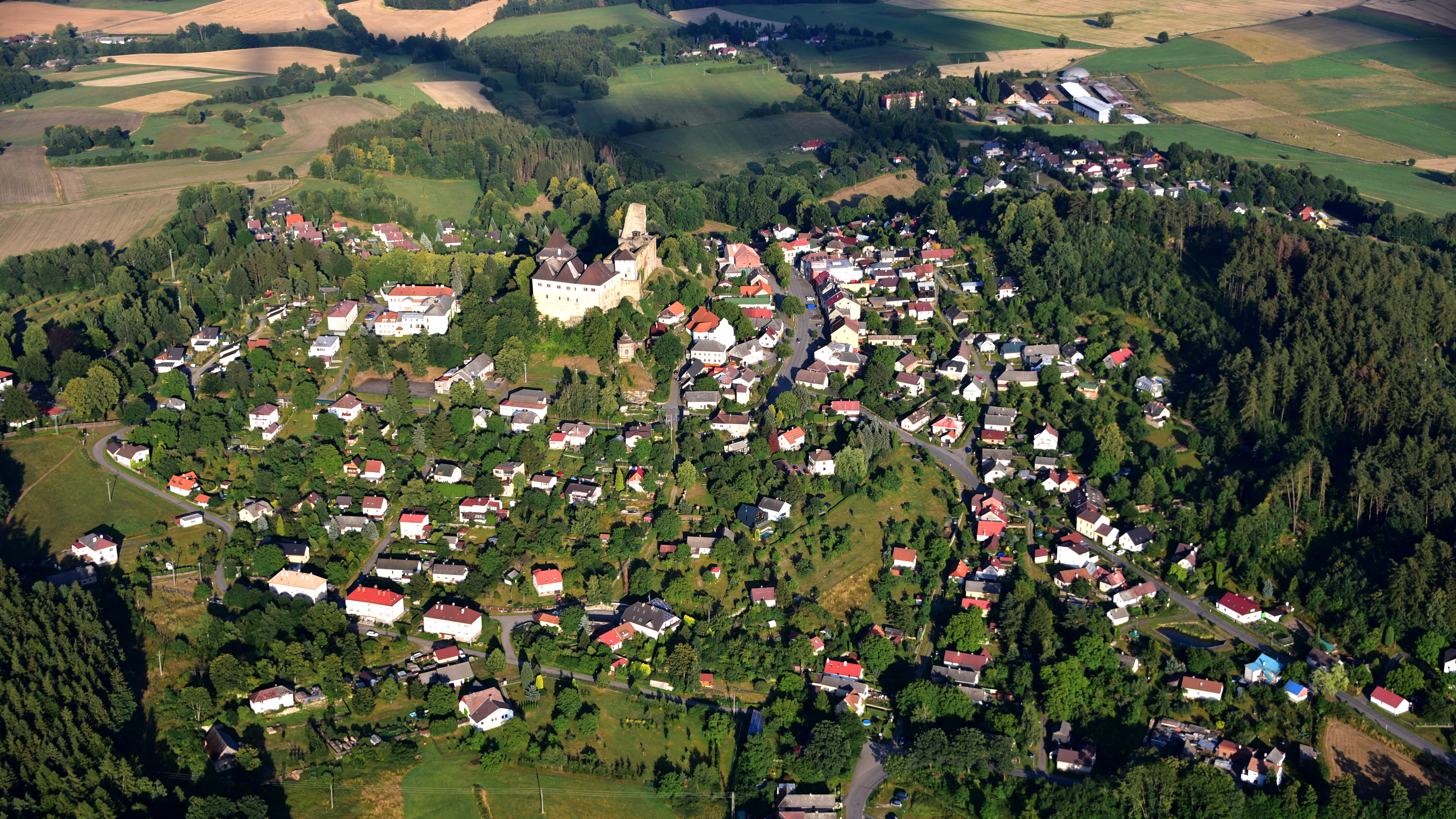
- Aerial view of the town with the castle

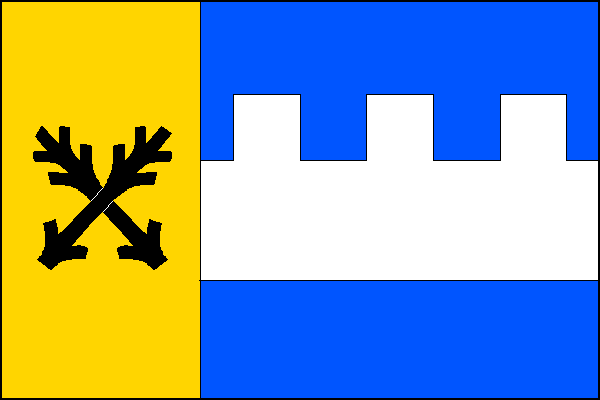
- Flag Coat of arms

- Location in the Czech Republic
- Coordinates: 49°36′47″N 15°24′49″E
- Country: Czech Republic
- Region: Vysočina
- District: Havlíčkův Brod
- Founded: 1310

Government
  - Mayor: Jana Brunerová

Area
  - Total: 11.15 km^{2} (4.31 sq mi)
- Elevation: 590 m (1,940 ft)

Population (2026-01-01)
  - Total: 653
  - Density: 58.6/km^{2} (152/sq mi)
- Time zone: UTC+1 (CET)
  - Summer (DST): UTC+2 (CEST)
- Postal code: 582 32
- Website: www.lipnicenadsazavou.cz

Lipnice nad Sázavou (Czech pronunciation: [ˈlɪpɲɪtsɛ ˈnat saːzavou]; German: Lipnitz) is a town in Havlíčkův Brod District in the Vysočina Region of the Czech Republic. It has about 700 inhabitants. It is located in a hilly landscape in the Křemešník Highlands. The town is known for the medieval Lipnice Castle, which is protected as a national cultural monument.

== Administrative division ==
Lipnice nad Sázavou consists of two municipal parts (in brackets population according to the 2021 census):

- Lipnice nad Sázavou (566)
- Vilémovec (32)

== Etymology ==
The name Lipnice is derived from the Czech word lípa ('linden') and the adjective lipný, referring to a linden hill or a water flowing through lindens.

== Geography ==
Lipnice nad Sázavou is located about 11 kilometres (7 mi) west of Havlíčkův Brod and 26 km (16 mi) northwest of Jihlava. It lies in a hilly landscape in the Křemešník Highlands. The highest point is the hill Pyramida at 620 m (2,034 ft) above sea level.

Despite the town's name, the Sázava River does not flow through the municipal territory and there are no significant watercourses. The fishpond Kamenná trouba and the eponymous nature reserve are located west of the town.

== History ==
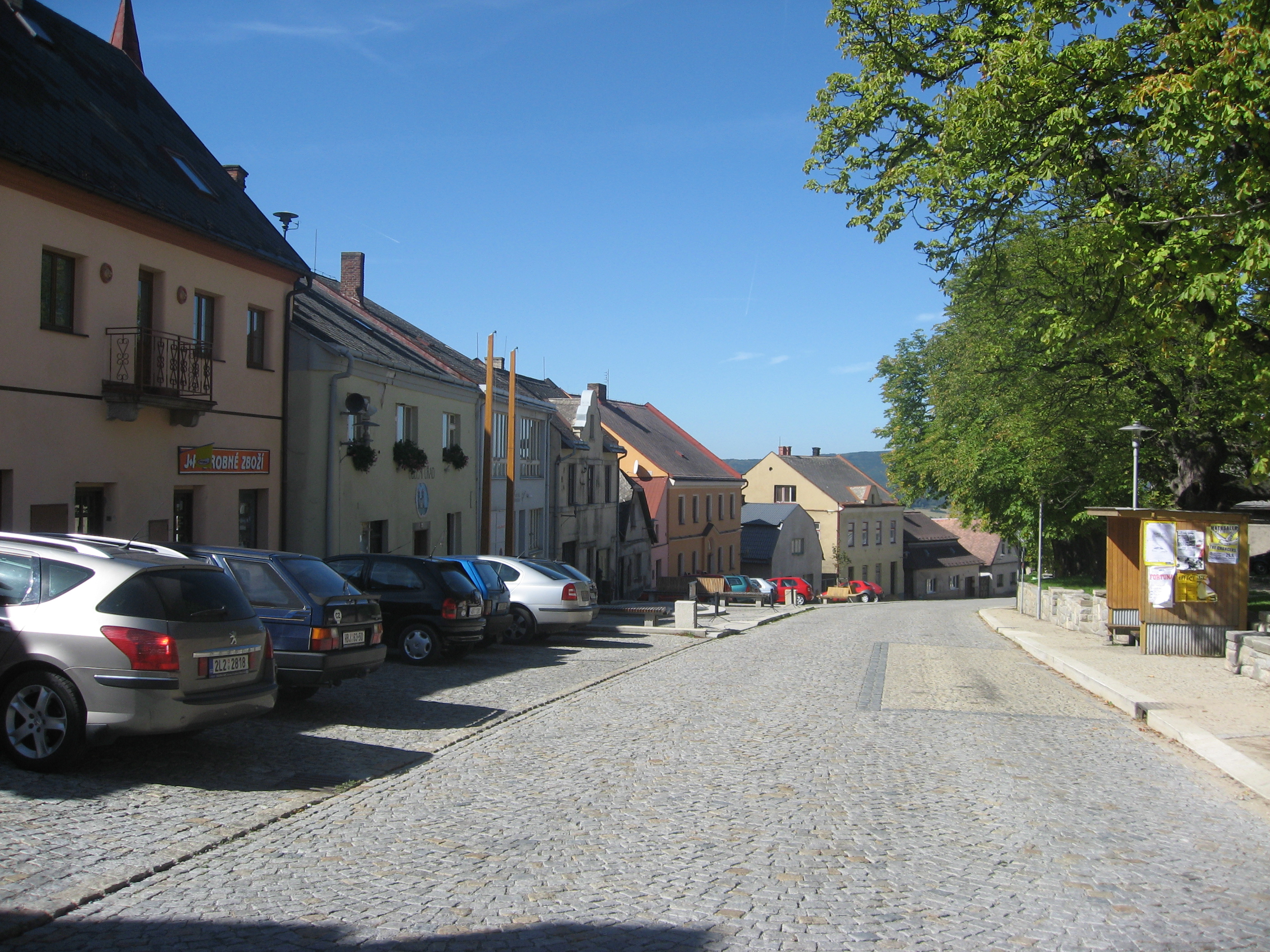
Town square

The first written mention of Lipnice is from 1226. It was the so-called Dolní Lipnice ('lower Lipnice') and refers to today's Dolní Město. The Lipnice Castle was founded in 1310 and the settlement of Horní Lipnice ('upper Lipnice') was founded together with the castle. In 1370, it was acquired by King Charles IV and promoted to a town. It was a town until the reforms in the middle of the 19th century.

It is very likely that the so-called Lipnice Bible from 1421 was finished here.

In September 2019, the town status was granted back to Lipnice and Sázavou.

== Demographics ==
Historical population

Year	Pop.	±%
1869	1,415	—
1880	1,420	+0.4%
1890	1,314	−7.5%
1900	1,282	−2.4%
1910	1,353	+5.5%

Year	Pop.	±%
1921	1,268	−6.3%
1930	1,186	−6.5%
1950	962	−18.9%
1961	989	+2.8%
1970	848	−14.3%

Year	Pop.	±%
1980	706	−16.7%
1991	620	−12.2%
2001	614	−1.0%
2011	606	−1.3%
2021	598	−1.3%

Source: Censuses

== Transport ==
There are no railways or major roads passing through the municipal territory.

== Sights ==
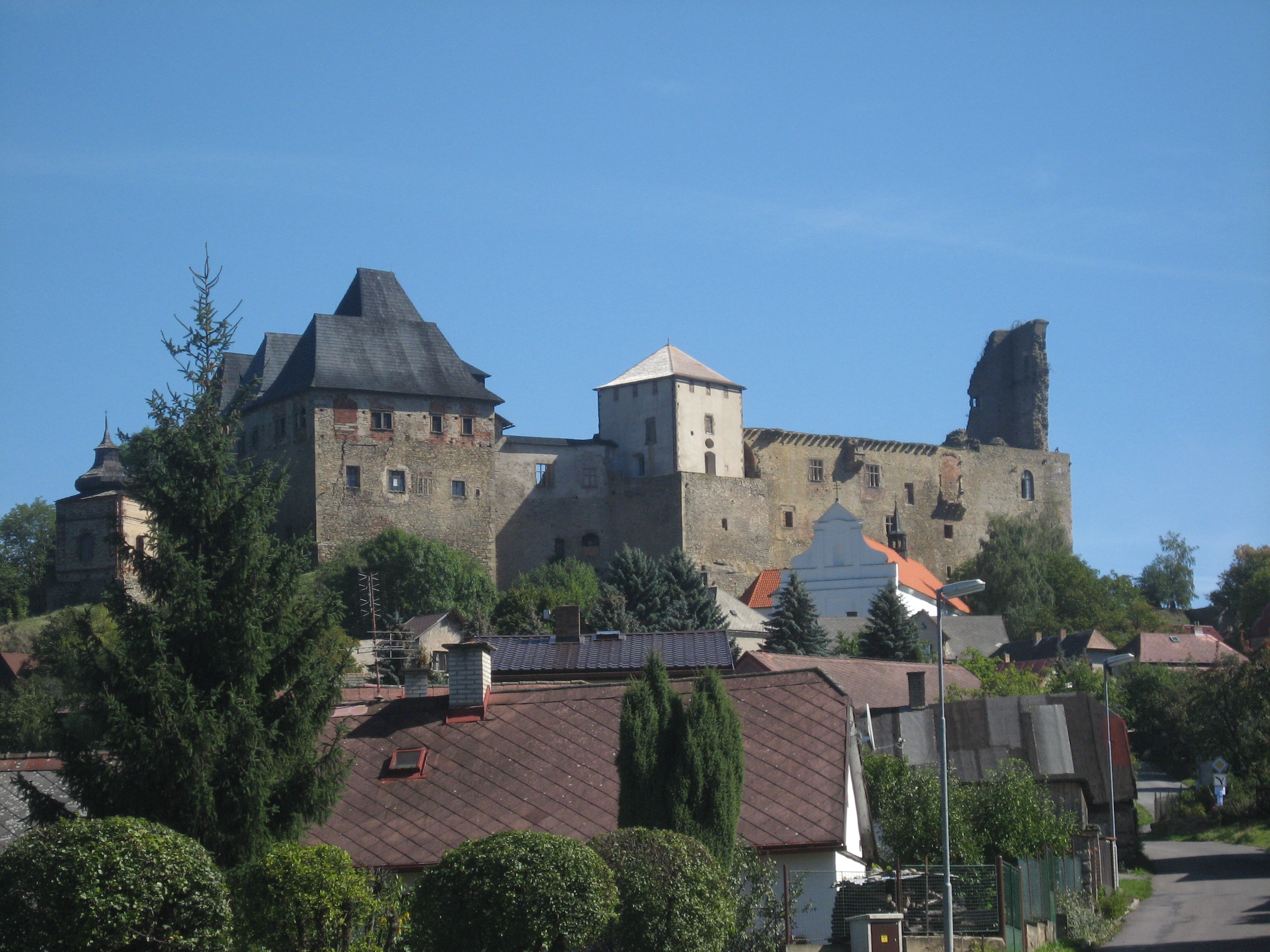
Lipnice Castle

The most notable landmark and the main tourist destination of the town is the Lipnice Castle. It is owned by the state and is protected as a national cultural monument. After the fire in 1869, part of the castle remained only a torso.

In the house where Jaroslav Hašek lived and worked in 1921–1923 is now the Memorial of Jaroslav Hašek with an exposition on his life and work.

== Notable people ==
- Jindřich Matyáš Thurn (1567–1640), nobleman and military leader
- Jaroslav Hašek (1883–1923), writer; lived and died here
- Karel Čáslavský (1937–2013), film historian
