= Betty Clooney =

American singer (1931–1976)

- Born: April 12, 1931; Maysville, Kentucky, U.S.
- Died: August 5, 1976 (aged 45); Las Vegas, Nevada, U.S.
- Spouse: Pupi Campo (m. 1955)
- Children: 4
- Relatives: Rosemary Clooney (sister); Nick Clooney (brother); George Clooney (nephew); Miguel Ferrer (nephew)
- Musical career
- Occupation: Singer
- Labels: King; Coral; RCA X; Columbia Children's

Elizabeth Ann Clooney (April 12, 1931 – August 5, 1976) was an American singer, TV presenter and pioneer who briefly rose to fame in the 1950s with her sister Rosemary Clooney. She led a very short solo career, with songs like "Kiki" and "You're All I See". She married actor and musician Pupi Campo in 1955, and they had four children.

== Early years ==
Elizabeth Ann Clooney was born in Maysville, Kentucky. She was the second of three children, her older sister was Rosemary Clooney, her younger brother was Nicholas Joseph Clooney, and her nephew was actor George Clooney.

Her father was a house painter with a drinking problem.

== Career ==
=== Sister act ===
Rosemary and Betty Clooney were a close sister act and sang together. The family lived in Cincinnati in the early 1940s, where the girls continued to vocalize. In 1945, the sisters won a spot on Cincinnati's WLW Radio Station as singers. One day they were heard by Tony Pastor (bandleader). The bandleader originally hesitated to hire both sisters but soon relented, and so The Clooney Sisters hit the road with the Pastor band. They appeared in a movie short with the Pastor Orchestra in 1947. The Clooney Sisters recorded a number of songs for Columbia with the Tony Pastor Band like "The Secretary Song", "I'm My Own Grandpa", and "If I Had a Million Dollars".

In 1950 Clooney performed in Cincinnati on television station WLWT. Not only was she a featured singer on the station's main program (called The 50-50 Club and broadcast on TV as well as radio), she also hosted her own shows called Teen Canteen and Boy Meets Girl.

=== Solo career ===
Betty also pursued a brief solo career, signing with R&B label King Records, releasing several singles including "Sisters" and "Kiki".

In the early 1950s, she was featured on the 15-minute weekday radio program The Three Suns With Betty Clooney on the Mutual Broadcasting System.

A nightclub career followed, including appearances at the Starlight Roof at the Waldorf Astoria, New York. A 1954 review of her performance at The Black Orchid in Chicago, Illinois, commented, "Betty Clooney, a much more vibrant and projecting personality than her sister, Rosemary, opened here to an audience that fell immediately to her contagious charm."

In 1955, she recorded a single, "Ko Ko Mo (I Love You So)," b/w "So All Alone", with singer Bill Darnell, known for his work with bandleader Bob Chester.

In 1952, Clooney became the mistress of ceremonies for a new program, Goin' Steady, on WXYZ-TV in Detroit. The program was "said to be the most elaborate locally sponsored variety show on the air." She was a regular on three CBS television programs in the 1950s:

- The Morning Show, hosted by Jack Paar, Fridays weekly (1953–1954)
- Good Morning! with Will Rogers, Jr., Mondays - Fridays (1954–1955)
- The Robert Q. Lewis Show, Mondays - Fridays (1955–1956)

She also appeared on countless variety shows in the 1950s where she sang, danced and acted in skits that showcased her voice and sense of humor. She recorded for several more record labels including RCA's X label, Decca's Coral label (where she had a minor hit with the song "Sin And Satin") and Columbia's Children's Records.

She also filmed several Soundies of popular hits. Although Betty recorded the hit song "Sisters" from the film White Christmas (1954) with Rosemary for Columbia's single release, in the movie Vera-Ellen's singing voice was dubbed by singer Trudy Stevens. Not one to seek fame, she subsequently retired from showbiz to raise her family, appearing only sporadically on television until her death.

== Death ==
Clooney died on August 5, 1976, in Las Vegas, Nevada, from a brain aneurysm.

== Legacy ==
After Clooney's death, her family established the Betty Clooney Foundation for Persons with Brain Injury. It operates the Betty Clooney Center for Persons with Traumatic Brain Injury near Los Angeles. Additional funds were raised by staging annual concerts to benefit the foundation.

== Partial discography ==
- Strangers/When You Love (You Should Love from the Heart) (1950, King 15072)
- All Over Again/It's All in the Game (1951 King 15150)
- Would I Love You (Love You, Love You)/Faithful (1951 King 15102)
- A Big City Boy Like You/Sin in Satin (1953 Coral 6100)
- You're the One/An Onion and You (1953 Round 101)
- I Idolize You/You're All I See (1953 Coral 60930)
- Si, Si, Senor/Whisper (1954 "X" 0076)
- Ki Ki/Just to Belong to You (1955 "X" 0158)
