= Nick Clooney =

American journalist, anchorman, politician, and television host (born 1934)

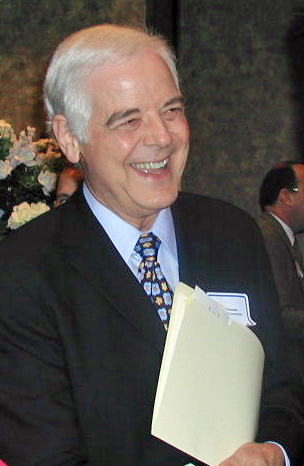
- Clooney in 2006
- Born: Nicholas Joseph Clooney; January 13, 1934 (age 92); Maysville, Kentucky, U.S.
- Occupations: Journalist, anchorman, game show host, television host
- Years active: 1958–present
- Political party: Democratic
- Spouse: Nina Warren (m. 1959)
- Children: 2, including George
- Relatives: Rosemary Clooney (sister); Betty Clooney (sister); Miguel Ferrer (nephew)

Nicholas Joseph Clooney (born January 13, 1934) is an American journalist, anchorman, politician, and television host. He is the brother of singers Rosemary Clooney and Betty Clooney, also the father of actor George Clooney and the uncle of actor Miguel Ferrer.

== Early life ==
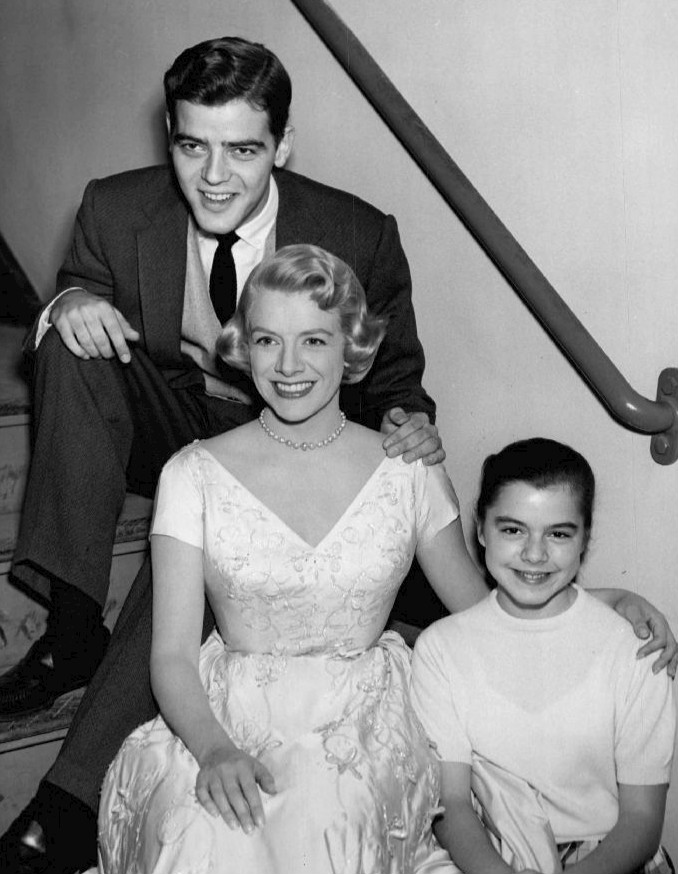
Nick and sisters Rosemary Clooney and Gail Stone at Rosemary's television program, The Lux Show, in 1957. Gail did not pursue a career in entertainment.

Clooney was born in Maysville, Kentucky, the son of Marie Frances (née Guilfoyle; 1904–1972) and Andrew Joseph Clooney (1902–1974). He was one of five children. His father was of Irish and German descent and his mother was of Irish ancestry.

While serving as a corporal in the U.S. Army, Clooney worked as a disc jockey in the American Forces Network in Germany, hosting the shows Music in the Air and Melody-Go-Round. He then moved to California for a try at show business. When that did not work out, Clooney moved to Ohio, where he met Nina Warren when she was a contestant in a beauty pageant he was judging; they married in August 1959. In addition to his son, George, Nick Clooney had a daughter named Adelia (known as Ada) (1960–2025).

=== Education ===
He attended St. Patrick's High School in Maysville, Kentucky.

== Broadcasting and journalism career ==
Clooney had an eight-year stint (1958–1966) at WKYT-TV in Lexington, Kentucky, then went to Ohio to host his own TV show, The Nick Clooney Show, first in Columbus, Ohio, for WLWC television in 1968, then for Cincinnati's WCPO-TV in 1969, and finally with its greatest degree of success for crosstown rival WKRC-TV through the early 1970s. The Nick Clooney Show was a local morning show, with a variety and talk-show format. In December 1974, he gained his first national fame by hosting the ABC daytime game show The Money Maze. Broadcast nationally on ABC at 4 p.m., WKRC-TV (at the time an ABC affiliate) delayed The Money Maze so it could be seen back-to-back with The Nick Clooney Show at 10:30 and 11 a.m., respectively.

After ABC canceled The Money Maze on July 4, 1975, Clooney returned to WKRC-TV and became the station's news director and lead anchor. As a journalist, he is probably best remembered for his coverage of the 1977 Beverly Hills Supper Club fire and its aftermath, which spanned several years. Many people in the region first heard about the fire from Clooney when WKRC interrupted its Saturday night prime-time schedule to broadcast news of the fire. Clooney pursued a hard news focus that was quite different from the sensationalism often seen on local television. Under his leadership, WKRC-TV became a solid #1 in the local news ratings, dethroning CBS affiliate WCPO-TV, which had controlled ratings for more than two decades under Al Schottelkotte's leadership.

After leaving WKRC in 1984, Clooney then worked in Los Angeles, California, as the 5 p.m. and 11 p.m. co-anchor at KNBC. He returned again to WKRC-TV in the late 1980s, but by that time, NBC affiliate WLWT was number one in the late newscast, with former Cincinnati mayor Jerry Springer as its main anchor; Clooney was not able to lead WKRC back to ratings leadership it enjoyed in the past. He moved on to Salt Lake City, Utah for several years to anchor and help launch the news operation of the market's Fox station KSTU with its 9 p.m. newscast. Then in 1994, Clooney worked a short stint as a news anchor for NBC affiliate WGRZ-TV in Buffalo, New York. He resurfaced nationally in television as a host and researcher for the cable channel American Movie Classics, where he introduced and presented backgrounds of classic movies, along with Bob Dorian. In 1999, he returned to his former radio home WSAI in Cincinnati, starting as afternoon host September 13, then moving to mornings in November to replace Bob Braun, who had health problems.

Because of his long association with WKRC-TV and helping it become one of the dominant stations in the Cincinnati area alongside WCPO-TV, Clooney has been critical of WKRC-TV's current owners, the Sinclair Broadcast Group, over their conservative viewpoints and their requiring affiliates to run certain news segments known as must-runs during its stations' local newscasts including WKRC-TV. Clooney was critical of Sinclair's mandated commentary scripts known as journalistic responsibility promos during the first presidency of Donald Trump, stating that he would have "quit and become a cab driver" if station management had forced him into reading it on the air.

== 2004 Congressional campaign ==
Clooney ran as a Democrat in the 2004 election for a seat in the House of Representatives representing Kentucky's 4th Congressional District. His opponent for the open seat was Republican Geoff Davis. Clooney was recruited to run by Ken Lucas, the outgoing Democratic congressman who had held onto the conservative district with his moderate views. With his name recognition and well-publicized endorsement from Lucas, Clooney was a big favorite to keep the seat in Democratic hands.

Early in 2004, Davis fought through a (sometimes rough) three-way Republican primary. The national media began to report on the electoral contest (due to Clooney's famous son George Clooney), and Davis began using the phrase "Hollywood vs the Heartland" to describe the race. Clooney's commanding early lead began to disappear and he was dealt a blow when both The Kentucky Enquirer and the Community Press newspapers endorsed Davis.

Clooney lost 44% to 54%. During his concession speech, he said his short career in politics was over. He went back to writing a column for The Cincinnati Post three times a week, covering a wide range of topics, until the Post's discontinuation at the end of 2007.

== Post-Congressional run ==
In 2006, Clooney and his son George traveled to Darfur, Sudan, and filmed a documentary, A Journey to Darfur, which was broadcast on American cable TV as well as in United Kingdom and France. In 2008, it was released on DVD with the proceeds from its sale being donated to the International Rescue Committee to help the people of Darfur.

Clooney became an activist for Darfur. He has done several open forums and speeches at local high schools in Ohio and Kentucky, and has participated in different rallies for Darfur. On March 16, 2007, following a Darfur rally, Clooney was awarded an honorary Class of 1952 diploma from St. Xavier High School, the high school he attended in Cincinnati before moving to California. On October 11, 2007, Clooney visited Turpin High School in Cincinnati to talk to students about Darfur. The University of Kentucky announced that it would present him with an honorary degree at its 2007 commencement.

Clooney served as the host of the Dayton Literary Peace Prize awards ceremony in both 2007 and 2008.

In fall 2008, Clooney joined the faculty at American University in Washington, D.C. as American University School of Communication and Newseum Distinguished Journalist in Residence. Clooney's appointment is part of a long-term partnership between the School of Communication and the Newseum, the interactive museum of news in Washington, D.C. As part of the school-Newseum partnership, Clooney hosted the fifth annual AU School of Communication-Newseum Reel Journalism Film Festival and other events at the Newseum. "After a news career that stretches back to the Eisenhower administration, I'm looking forward to joining American University's School of Communication and the Newseum to work with a new generation of prospective journalists," said Clooney.

Clooney taught Opinion Writing in fall 2008, and in spring 2009, he taught Films that Changed Us, a new course based on his book, The Movies That Changed Us: Reflections on the Screen (Atria, 2002). The book analyzes the significance of such iconic American films as The Birth of a Nation, The Jazz Singer, Dr. Strangelove, Stagecoach, The Graduate, Star Wars and Saving Private Ryan.

Clooney was the commencement speaker for the University of Cincinnati on June 8, 2012, and was awarded an honorary degree the following day.

In 2014, Clooney appeared in The Monuments Men which was directed by his son, George Clooney, who played one of the leading characters, Stokes. Nick Clooney played the older Stokes visiting Bruges, Belgium, years later to see the Madonna, which was one of the many treasures rescued by the Monuments Men.

In 2021, Clooney joined the Sons of the American Revolution.

== Bibliography ==
- The Movies That Changed Us: Reflections on the Screen. New York: Atria Books, a trademark of Simon & Schuster. November 2002. ISBN 0-7434-1043-2.

Party political offices
Preceded by Ken Lucas	Democratic nominee for United States Representative from Kentucky's 4th congressional district 2004	Succeeded by Ken Lucas
