= List of theology journals =

Theological journals are academic periodical publications in the field of theology. WorldCat returns about 4,000 items for the search subject "Theology Periodicals" and more than 2,200 for "Bible Periodicals". Some journals are listed below.

== 0–9 ==
Name	ISSN	Abbreviations	Publication years	Publisher	City, state/province	Country	Affiliation
9Marks			2006–present	Jonathan Leeman, Trevin Wax			

== A ==
Name	ISSN	Abbreviations	Publication years	Publisher	City, state/province	Country	Affiliation
Adventist Review, orig. The Present Truth	0161-1119		1849–present	Review and Herald	Hagerstown, Maryland	United States	Adventist
Adventist Today	1079-5499		1993–present	Adventist Today Foundation	Sandy, Oregon	United States	Adventist
Africa Journal of Evangelical Theology	1026-2946	AJET		Scott Christian University	Machakos	Kenya	Evangelical
Africa Theological Journal	0253-9322	AfrTheolJ		Tumaini University Makumira	Arusha	Tanzania	Academic
AJS Review	0364-0094 (print) 1475-4541 (online)	AJS Rev	1976–present	Association for Jewish Studies by Cambridge University Press		United Kingdom	Judaism
Al Kawsar			2005–present	Markazud Dawah Al Islamia	Dhaka	Bangladesh	Islamic
al-Manar			1898–1935	Muhammad Abduh	Cairo	Egypt	Islamic
American Baptist Quarterly	0745-3698	AmBaptistQ	1982–present	American Baptist Historical Society	Rochester, New York	United States	Baptist
The American Catholic Quarterly Review			1876–1924		Philadelphia, Pennsylvania	United States	Catholic
American Journal of Biblical Theology	1531-7919	AJBT	2000–present		Hayesville, North Carolina	USA	Christian
American Journal of Theology, see The Journal of Religion							
American Religion	2643-9255		2019–present	Indiana University Press	Bloomington, Indiana	United States	
American Theological Inquiry	1942-2709	ATI	2008–2015	American Theological Inquiry	Minneapolis, Minnesota	United States	
Ancient Near Eastern Studies, orig. Abr-Nahrain	1378-4641	ANES	1989–2023	Semitic Studies, Melbourne and Sydney Uni; Peeters	Melbourne; Leuven	Australia; Belgium	Academic
Andrews University Seminary Studies	0003-2980	AUSS				United States	
Angelicum	1123-5772		1924–present	Pontifical University of St. Thomas Aquinas	Rome	Italy	Catholic
Anglican Journal			1875–present	Anglican Church of Canada		Canada	Anglican
Anglican Theological Review	0003-3286	ATR	1918–present	Episcopal Church in the United States and Anglican Church of Canada		United States, Canada	Anglican/Episcopalian
Annales Theologici	0394-8226			Pontificia Università della Santa Croce	Rome	Italy	Catholic
Annual of the Swedish Theological Institute	0082-0423	ASTI	1962–1983	E.J. Brill, Leiden	Jerusalem	Israel	
Analogia	2529–0967		2016–present	St. Maxim the Greek Institute	Athens	Greece	Eastern Orthodox
Antiguo Oriente	1667-9202	Academic		Centro de Estudios de Historia del Antiguo Oriente	Buenos Aires	Argentina	Catholic
Antiphon: A Journal for Liturgical Renewal	1543-9925	Ant		Society for Catholic Liturgy	Hannover, Pennsylvania	United States	Catholic
Aramaic Studies	1477-8351 (print) or 1745-5227 (online)	ARST	2003–present	Brill	Leiden & Boston	Netherlands & United States	Academic
Archiv für Orientforschungen	1015-3403						
Ashland Theological Bulletin, continues from vol 14 as Ashland Theological Journal, see below	0888-2185	ATB	1968–1980	Ashland Theological Seminary	Ashland, Ohio	United States	Academic
Ashland Theological Journal	1044-6494	ATJ	1981–present	Ashland Theological Seminary	Ashland, Ohio	United States	Academic
Asia Journal of Theology	0218-0812	AJT (also Asian J. Theolog.)	1983–present	Association for Theological Education in South East Asia	Baguio	Philippines	
Asian Journal of Pentecostal Studies	0118-8534	AJPS	1998–present	Asia Pacific Theological Seminary	Baguio	Philippines	Pentecostal
Asian Journal of Religious Studies, formerly called AUC	2249-1503 (print) or 2582-791X (online)	AJRS	1955–present	Papal Seminary	Pune, Maharashtra	India	Academic, Catholic
Asociación de Biblistas Mexicanos (in Spanish)				Asociación de Biblistas Mexicanos	Tlalpan, Mexico City	Mexico	Christian
Augustinianum	0004-8011	August	1961–present	Patristic Institute Augustinianum	Rome	Italy	Catholic
Australian Biblical Review	0004-8011	ABR also AusBibRev	1951–present	Fellowship for Biblical Studies		Australia	Academic

== B ==
Name	ISSN	Abbreviations	Publication years	Publisher	City, state/province	Country	Affiliation
Baptist Ministers' Journal		BMJ		Baptist Ministers' Fellowship	Didcot, Oxfordshire	United Kingdom	
Baptist Quarterly	0005-576X	BaptistQ	1922–present	Baptist Historical Society	London	United Kingdom	Baptist
Baptistic Theologies	1803-618X	BT	2009–present	International Baptist Theological Study Centre	Amsterdam	The Netherlands	Baptist
Beihefte zur Zeitschrift für die Alttestamentliche Wissenschaft	0934-2575	BZAW		Walter de Gruyter	Berlin	Germany	
Beihefte zur Zeitschrift für die Neutestamentliche Wissenschaft	0171-6441	BZNW		Walter de Gruyter	Berlin	Germany	
Beit Mikra	0005-979X		1956–present	World Jewish Bible Center		Israel	Judaism
Bible and Spade	1079-6959 (print)	B&S	1972–current	Associates for Biblical Research	Akron, Pennsylvania	United States	Academic, Archaeology
Bible Review	8755-6316	BibRev	1985–2005	Biblical Archaeology Society	Washington, D.C.	United States	Academic
Bible Today	0006-0836	BibTod		Liturgical Press	Collegeville, Minnesota	United States	Episcopalian
The Bible Translator, see also Technical Papers for the Bible Translator, Practical Papers for the Bible Translator	0006-0844 (print) or 2051-6770 (online)	BT		United Bible Societies		United Kingdom	
Biblica	0006-0887	Bib		Pontifical Biblical Institute	Rome	Italy	Catholic
Biblical and Ancient Greek Linguistics Journal		BAGL		McMaster Divinity College & Wipf & Stock		United States	Academic
Biblical Archaeologist	0006-0895	BA	1938–1997	American Schools of Oriental Research	Philadelphia, Pennsylvania	United States	Academic
Biblical Archaeology Review	0098-9444	BAR		Biblical Archaeology Society	Washington, D.C.	United States	Academic
Biblical Interpretation	0927-2569	BI					
Biblical Research	0067-6535	BR	1956–present	Chicago Society of Biblical Research	Chicago, Illinois	United States	
Biblical Theology Bulletin	0146-1079	BibThBul			Jamaica, New York	United States	
Bibliotheca Sacra	0006-1921	BibSac (also BSac and BS)	1844–present	Dallas Theological Seminary	Dallas, Texas	United States	Evangelical
Biblische Notizen	0178-2967	BN				Germany	
Biblische Zeitschrift	0006-2014	BZ				Germany	
Black Theology: An International Journal	1476-9948						
Bogoslovni vestnik	0006-5722			Faculty of Theology (University of Ljubljana)	Ljubljana	Slovenia	Academic
Bulletin de littérature ecclésiastique (in French)	0007-4322	BLE		fr:Institut Catholique Toulouse	Toulouse	France	Catholic
Bulletin for Biblical Research	1065-223X	BBR		Institute for Biblical Research	Winona Lake, Indiana	United States	
Bulletin for Old Testament Studies in Africa, was Newsletter on African Old Testament Scholarship	1502-0819 (print) or 1502-0827 (online)	BOTSA		School of Mission and Theology	Stavanger	Norway	
Bulletin of the American Schools of Oriental Research	0003-097X	BASOR		American Schools of Oriental Research	Baltimore, Maryland	United States	Academic
Bulletin of the Evangelical Theological Society, see the Journal of the Evangelical Theological Society							Evangelical
The Burning Bush	0219-5984	BB	1995–present	Far Eastern Bible College	Singapore	Singapore	Reformed

== C ==
Name	ISSN	Abbreviations	Publication years	Publisher	City, state/province	Country	Affiliation
Calvin Theological Journal	0008-1795	CTJ	1966–present	Calvin Theological Seminary	Grand Rapids, Michigan	United States	
Canadian-American Theological Review	1198-7804	CATR	2012–present	Canadian-American Theological Association		Canada/USA	Academic
The Canadian Journal of Orthodox Christianity	1715-9199	CJOC	2006–present	Saint Arseny Orthodox Christian Theological Institute (OCA Archdiocese of Canada)	Winnipeg, Canada	Canada	Eastern Orthodox
Canadian Journal of Theology	0576-5579	CJT	1955–1970		Toronto, Ontario	Canada	Academic
Catholic Biblical Quarterly	0008-7912	CBQ		Catholic Biblical Association of America	Washington, D.C.	United States	Catholic
Catholic World				Missionary Society of Saint Paul the Apostle	Washington, D.C.	United States	Catholic
Central Bible Quarterly	0008-9311			Central Conservative Baptist Theological Seminary	Minneapolis, Minnesota	United States	Baptist
Chafer Theological Seminary Journal		CTSJ	1995–2009	Chafer Theological Seminary	Albuquerque, New Mexico	United States	
Christian Apologetics Journal	1930-9074			Southern Evangelical Seminary	Matthews, North Carolina	United States	Evangelical
Christian Education Journal	0739-8913 (print) or 2378-525X (online)	CEJ		Talbot School of Theology	La Mirada, California	United States	
Christian History	0891-9666			Christianity Today International then Christian History Institute	Carol Stream, Illinois	United States	
Christian Orient	0258-1744	CO	1980–present	Pontifical Oriental Institute India	Vadavathoor, Kottayam	India	Academic
Christian Scholar's Review	0017-2251	CSR		Christian Scholar's Review	Holland, Minnesota 49422	United States	Evangelical
Science and Christian Belief	0954-4194	CSB	1989–present	Victoria Institute		United Kingdom	Evangelical
Christianity Magazine	1747-7395			Premier Christian Media Trust		United Kingdom	
Christianity Today	0009-5753			Christianity Today International	Carol Stream, Illinois	United States	
Church History	0009-6407 (print) or 1755-2613 (online)	CH	1932–present	American Society of Church History	New Haven, Connecticut	United States	
Churchman	0009-661X			Church Society		United Kingdom	Evangelical
Clark Journal of Theology	2455-5789	CJT	2011–present	Clark Theological College	Mokokchung, Nagaland	India	Academic
Colloquium: the Australian and New Zealand Theological Review	0588-3237		1968–present	The Australian and New Zealand Association of Theological Studies	Sydney, NSW	Australia	Academic
Comment	1496-8916		1983–present	Cardus	Hamilton, Ontario	Canada	
Communio: International Catholic Review				Communio Foundation	Washington, D.C.	United States	Catholic
Communio Viatorum	0010-3713	CV		Protestant Theological Faculty	Prague	Czech Republic	Protestant
Concilium: Revue Internationale de Théologie				Concilium Foundation	Nijmegen	Netherlands	Catholic
Concordia Journal				Concordia Seminary	St. Louis, Missouri	United States	Lutheran
Concordia Theological Quarterly	0038-8610	CTQ		Concordia Theological Seminary	Fort Wayne, Indiana	United States	Lutheran
Conservative Judaism				Jewish Theological Seminary of America and Rabbinical Assembly	New York City, New York	United States	Conservative Judaism
Conspectus: Journal of South African Theological Seminary				South African Theological Seminary		South Africa	Evangelical
Conservative Theological Journal				Tyndale Theological Seminary	Fort Worth, Texas	United States	Evangelical
Covenanter became The Reformed Presbyterian and Covenanter			1845-1862	David Smith	Pittsburgh, Pennsylvania	United States	Reformed
Credenda/Agenda				Christ Church	Moscow, Idaho	United States	Reformed
Credo Magazine				Matthew Barrett		United States	Evangelical
Crescent International						Canada, South Africa and Pakistan	Islam
Criswell Theological Review	0892-5712	CTR	1986–present	Criswell College			
Critical Review of Books in Religion	0894-8860			Scholars Press	Atlanta, Georgia	United States	Academic
Crozer Quarterly			1924-?	Andover Theological Seminary	Newton, Massachusetts	United States	
Crucible – The Christian Journal of Social Ethics	0011-2100			Church of England, Board for Social Responsibility by Hymns Ancient and Modern		United Kingdom	
Crucible: Theology and Ministry	1836-8794			Australian Evangelical Alliance		Australia	
Crux	0011-2186			Regent College	Vancouver, British Columbia	Canada	Evangelical
Current Dialogue	1814-2230 (print) or 1814-2249 (online?)	CD	1980–present	World Council of Churches	Geneva	Switzerland	
Currents in Biblical Research	1476-993X (print) or 1745-5200 (online)	CurrBiblicRes	2002–present	Continuum Publishing Group or SAGE Publications	London	United Kingdom	
Currents in Theology and Mission	0098-2113	CurTM (also Curr. Theol. Mission)	1974–present	Evangelical Lutherans in Mission, Christ Seminary-Seminex	Chicago, Illinois	United States	

== D ==
Name	ISSN	Abbreviations	Publication years	Publisher	City, state/province	Country	Affiliation
Dead Sea Discoveries	0929-0761 (print) or 1568-5179 (online)	DSD		Brill	Leiden & Boston	Netherlands & United States	Academic
Denver Journal			1998–present	Denver Seminary	Denver, Colorado	United States	
Detroit Baptist Seminary Journal	1094-8473			Detroit Baptist Theological Seminary	Allen Park, Michigan	United States	Baptist
Dialogue: A Journal of Mormon Thought	0012-2157 (print) or 1554-9399 (online)		1966–present	Dialogue Foundation	Salt Lake City, Utah	United States	Mormon
Discipleship Journal	0273-5865		1981–present	Navigators	Colorado Springs, Colorado	United States	Evangelical
Didaskalia	0847-1266		1989–present	Providence College and Theological Seminary	Otterburne, Manitoba	Canada	Christian
Direction: A Mennonite Brethren Forum	0384-8515		1972–present	Canadian Mennonite University	Winnipeg, Manitoba	Canada	Christian
Doon Theological Journal	0973-4678		2004–present	Luther W. New Jr. Theological College		India	
Dor le dor - became Jewish Bible Quarterly	0334-2166			World Jewish Bible Society or World Jewish Bible Center	Jerusalem	Israel	Jewish
The Downside Review	0012-5806	DR	1880–present	College of St. Gregory, Downside Abbey & SAGE Publications	Radstock, Bath	United Kingdom	Catholic
The Dunwoodie Review	0419-8379	DunRev	1961–present	Saint Joseph's Seminary	Yonkers, New York	United States	Catholic

== E ==
Name	ISSN	Abbreviations	Publication years	Publisher	City, state/province	Country	Affiliation
Ecotheology							
The Ecumenical Review	0013-0796	EcumRev		World Council of Churches and Ecumenical Centre	Geneva	Switzerland	Ecumenism
Elenchus of Biblica							
Emmaus Journal	1546-6973		1991–present	Emmaus University (formerly Emmaus Bible College)	Dubuque, Iowa	United States	
ENCOUNTER. A Journal of Interdisciplinary Reflections of Faith and Life	2249-1856	EJIRFL	2008–present	Marymatha Major Seminary	Thrissur	India	Catholic
Ephemerides Theologicæ Louvanienses	0013-9513	ETL		Katholieke Universiteit Leuven & Université catholique de Louvain	Leuven & Louvain-la-Neuve	Belgium	Academic
Ephrem's Theological Journal		ETJ		Saint Ephrem's Theological College	Satna	India	Catholic
Ethics was the International Journal of Ethics	0014-1704	Ethics	1890–present	University of Chicago Press	Chicago, Illinois	United States	Academic
European Journal of Theology	0960-2720	EJT	1992–present	Fellowship of European Evangelical Theologians (FEET) by Paternoster Periodicals	London	United Kingdom	Academic and Evangelical
Evangelical Journal	0741-1758	EJ	1983–present	Evangelical Seminary or Evangelical School of Theology	Myerstown, Pennsylvania	United Statues	Evangelical
Evangelical Missions Quarterly	0014-3359		1964–present	Evangelical Missions Information Service	South Pasadena, California	United States	Evangelical
Evangelical Quarterly	0014-3367	EQ (also EvQ)	1929–present		Exeter	United Kingdom	Christian
Evangelical Review of Society and Politics	1750-2217 (print) or 1750-2225 (online)	ERS&P	2007–2012	King's Evangelical Divinity School	Broadstairs, Kent	United Kingdom	Christian
Evangelical Review of Theology and Politics	2053-6763 (online)	ERT&P	2013–present	Independent	International		Christian
Evangelical Review of Theology				World Evangelical Alliance by Paternoster Periodicals			Evangelical
Ex Auditu							
The Expositor		Exp	1875–1925		Cleveland, Ohio	United States	
Expository Times	0014-5246 (print) or 1745-5308 (online)	ExpT (also ExpTim)	1889–present	University of Edinburgh, SAGE Publications	Edinburgh	Scotland, United Kingdom	Academic

== F ==
Name	ISSN	Abbreviations	Publication years	Publisher	City, state/province	Country	Affiliation
Faith and Mission	0740-0659		1983–2008	Southeastern Baptist Theological Seminary	Wake Forest, North Carolina	United States	
Faith and Thought - Journal of the Transactions of the Victoria Institute (replaced the Journal of the Transactions of the Victoria Institute was first published in 1867 and continued through to 1957)			1958–present	Victoria Institute		United Kingdom	
Filología Neotestamentaria	0214 2996	FN	1988–present	Department of Antiquities of the University of Córdoba, Spain	Córdoba	Spain	
First Things	1047-5141		1990–present	The Institute on Religion and Public Life	New York City, New York	United States	Christian
The Founders Journal			1990–present	Founders Press		United States	Southern Baptist
Fragmenta de cultura				Universidade Católica de Goiás	Goiás	Brazil	Catholic

== G ==
Name	ISSN	Abbreviations	Publication years	Publisher	City, state/province	Country	Affiliation
Global Journal of Classical Theology	1521-6055		1998–present	Trinity College and Theological Seminary	Newburgh, Indiana	United States	
Grace Journal (n.b. replaced by Grace Theological Journal)		GraceJ (also GJ)	1960–1973	Grace Theological Seminary	Winona Lake, Indiana	United States	
Grace Theological Journal	0198-666X	GraceTJ (also GTJ)	1980–1991	Grace Theological Seminary	Winona Lake, Indiana	United States	
The Greek Orthodox Theological Review	0017-3894	GOTR	1954–present	Hellenic College Holy Cross Greek Orthodox School of Theology	Brookline, Massachusetts	United States	Eastern Orthodox

== H ==
Name	ISSN	Abbreviations	Publication years	Publisher	City, state/province	Country	Affiliation
Harvard Theological Review	0017-81600 (print) or 1475-4517 (online)	HTR	1908–present	Harvard Divinity School	Cambridge, Massachusetts	United States	Christian
Hebrew Union College Annual	0360-9049	HUCA (also Hebr. Union Coll. Ann.)	1924–present	Hebrew Union College, Jewish Institute of Religion	Cincinnati, Ohio	United States	
History of Religions	0018-2710	HR	1961–present	University of Chicago Press	Chicago, Illinois	United States	
Horizons: The Journal of the College Theology Society	0360-9669	Horizons	1974–present	College Theology Society, Villanova University	Villanova, Pennsylvania	United States	Catholic
Horizons in Biblical Theology	0195-9085	HBT	1979–present	Pittsburgh Theological Seminary by Brill	Pittsburgh, Pennsylvania	United States	

== I ==
Name	ISSN	Abbreviations	Publication years	Publisher	City, state/province	Country	Affiliation
International Journal of Islam	2572-5556	Int. J. Islam	2023–present	publication of The Lighthouse Schools	Chicago	United States	
Indian Journal of Theology	0019-5685	Ind. J. Theol.	1952–2004	Bishop's College, Calcutta and Serampore College (India)	Calcutta	India	
International Bulletin of Missionary Research	0272-6122	IBMR	1950–present	Overseas Ministries Study Center	New Haven, Connecticut	United States	
International Journal of Orthodox Theology	2190-0582	IJOT	2010–present			Germany	
International Journal for Philosophy of Religion	0020-7047						
International Journal of Systematic Theology	1463–1652	IJST	1999–present	Blackwell-Wiley	Oxford	United Kingdom	Ecumenical
International Review of Mission	0020-8582 (print) or 1758-6631 (online)	IRM	1912–present	World Council of Churches in partnership with Blackwell-Wiley	Geneva	Switzerland	
Interpretation	0020-9643 (print) or 2159-340X (online)	Int (also Interp)	1947–present	Union Theological Seminary in Virginia	Richmond, Virginia	United States	
Interpreter: A Journal of Mormon Scripture	2372-1227 (print) or 2372-126X (online)		2012–present	The Interpreter Foundation	Provo, Utah	United States	LDS (Mormon)
Interpreting Ancient Manuscripts		IAM					
Irish Theological Quarterly	0021-1400	IrTheologQ	1951–present	St Patrick's College by SAGE Publications	Maynooth, Dublin	Republic of Ireland	Catholic
Israel Exploration Journal	0021-2059	IEJ	1950–present	Israel Exploration Society	Jerusalem	Israel	Jewish

== J ==
Name	ISSN	Abbreviations	Publication years	Publisher	City, state/province	Country	Affiliation
Journal of AIIAS African Theological Association (JAATA)			2008–present	Adventist International Institute of Advanced Studies	Silang, Cavite, Philippines		
Jerusalem Perspective	0792-1357			Jerusalem School of Synoptic Research	Jerusalem	Israel	Christian and Jewish
Jewish Bible Quarterly	0792-3910	JBQ		Jewish Bible Association & World Jewish Bible Center	Jerusalem	Israel	Jewish
The Jewish Quarterly Review	0021-6682 (print) 1553-0604 (online)	JQR	1888–present	University of Pennsylvania Press	Philadelphia, Pennsylvania	United States	Jewish Academic
Jnanadeepa: Pune Journal of Religious Studies	0972-3331 (print) or 2582-8711 (online)	JPJRS	1998–present	Jnana Deepa, Institute of Philosophy and Theology	Pune	India	Catholicism Academic
Jonathan Edwards Studies Journal	2159-6875	JES	2011–present	Jonathan Edwards Center at Yale University	New Haven, Connecticut	United States	Academic
Josephinum Journal of Theology	1071-8257			Pontifical College Josephinum	Columbus, Ohio	United States	Catholic
Journal of Ancient Judaism	1869-3296	JAJ	2010–present	Vandenhoeck & Ruprecht	Göttingen	Germany	Judaism
Journal of Ancient Judaism: Supplements	2198-1361	JAJSup		Vandenhoeck & Ruprecht	Göttingen	Germany	Judaism
Journal of the Adventist Theological Society	1550-7378	JATS	1990	Adventist Theological Society	Collegedale, Tennessee	United States	Adventist
Journal of the American Oriental Society	0003-0279	JAOS	1843–present	American Oriental Society	Baltimore, Maryland	United States	Archeological
Journal of Biblical and Pneumatological Research	1044-6494			Wipf and Stock	Eugene, Oregon	United States	
Journal of Biblical Apologetics	1938-6397	JBA	2000–present	California Biblical University and Seminary	Orange, California	United States	
Journal of Biblical Counseling, formerly the Journal of Pastoral Practice	1063-2166	JBC	1977–present	Christian Counseling & Educational Foundation	Glenside, Pennsylvania	United States	Evangelical
Journal of Biblical Literature	0021-9231	JBL	1881–present	Society of Biblical Literature or Society of Biblical Literature and Exegesis	Atlanta, Georgia	United States	Ecumenical
Journal for Biblical Manhood and Womanhood	1544-5143	JBMW	1995–present	Council on Biblical Manhood and Womanhood		United States	
Journal for Christian Theological Research	1087-1624	JCTR	1996–present	Christian Theological Research Fellowship, American Academy of Religion Systematic Theology Group	Azusa, California	United States	
Journal of Contemporary Religion	1353-7903 (print) or 1469-9419 (online)	J. Contemp. Relig.	1985–present	Routledge, Taylor & Francis Group or Carfax International Publishers	Abingdon, Oxfordshire	United Kingdom	
Journal of Cuneiform Studies	0022-0256	JCS	1947–present	American Schools of Oriental Research	Cambridge, Massachusetts	United States	Academic
Journal of Dispensational Theology (formerly The Conservative Theological Journal)	1947-9492	JODT	1997–present	Tyndale Theological Seminary	Fort Worth, Texas	United States	Evangelical
Journal of Early Christian History	2222-582X (print)	JECH		Unisa Press and Routledge, Taylor & Francis Group	Pretoria	South Africa	
Journal of Early Christian Studies	1067-6341 (print) or 1086-3184 (online)	JECS	1993–present	Johns Hopkins University Press	Baltimore, Maryland	United States	
Journal of Ecclesiastical History	0022-0469 (print) or 1469-7637 (online)	JEH (also J. Ecclesiast. Hist.)	1950–present	Cambridge University Press	Cambridge	United Kingdom	
Journal of Ecumenical Studies	0022-0558	JES	1964–present	University of Pennsylvania Press	Philadelphia, Pennsylvania	United States	Academic, Ecumenical, Interfaith
Journal of European Baptist Studies	1213-1520	JEBS	2000–present	International Baptist Theological Study Centre	Amsterdam	The Netherlands	Baptist
Journal for the Evangelical Study of the Old Testament	2169-0685	JESOT		Wipf and Stock		United States	Evangelical, academic
Journal of the Evangelical Theological Society (formerly the Bulletin of the Evangelical Theological Society)	0360-8808 (print) or 1745-5251 (online)	JETS	1958–present	Evangelical Theological Society	Lynchburg, Virginia	United States	Evangelical
The Journal of Family Ministry	1055-2308			North American Professors of Christian Education (NAPCE)	Louisville, Kentucky 40280	United States	
Journal of Feminist Studies in Religion	8755-4178 (print) or 1553-3913 (online)	JFSR		Indiana University Press			
Journal of the Grace Evangelical Society		JOTGES		Grace Evangelical Society	Irving, Texas	United States	
Journal of Greco-Roman Christianity and Judaism	1467-1085 (print) or 1467-1093 (online)	JGrJC (also J. Greco-Roman Christ. Jud.)	2000–present	McMaster Divinity College	Hamilton, Ontario	Canada	
Journal of Greek Linguistics	1566-5844 (print) or 1569-9846 (online)	JGL		Brill	Leiden & Boston	Netherlands & United States	Academic
Journal of Halacha and Contemporary Society				Rabbi Jacob Joseph School	Staten Island, New York	United States	Jewish
Journal of Hebrew Scriptures	1203–1542	JHS	1996–present	Gorgias Press	Edmonton, Alberta	Canada	Academic
The Journal of Higher Criticism	1075-7139	JHC		Institute for Higher Critical Studies, Drew Theological School	Madison, New Jersey	United States	
The Journal of the Institute of Reformed Baptist Studies	2333-9675	JIRBS		Reformed Baptist Academic Press	Escondido, California	United States	Reformed Baptist
Journal of Islamic Studies			1990–present	Oxford Centre for Islamic Studies and is published by Oxford University Press		United Kingdom	Islamic
Journal of Jewish Studies	0022-2097	JJS	1948–present	Oxford Centre for Postgraduate Hebrew Studies or Oxford Centre for Hebrew and Jewish Studies	Cambridge	United Kingdom	
The Journal of Jewish Thought and Philosophy	1053-699X (print) or 1477-285X (online)	JJTP		Routledge, Taylor & Francis Group or Brill	Leiden	Netherlands	
Journal of Late Antique Religion and Culture (2007–2008)	1754-517X	JLARC		Cardiff University, Centre for Late Antique Religion & Culture	Cardiff	Wales	
Journal of Markets & Morality	1098-1217 (print) or 1944-7841 (online)			Acton Institute for the Study of Religion and Liberty	Grand Rapids, Michigan	United States	
Journal of Ministry and Theology	1092-9525			Baptist Bible Seminary	Clarks Summit, Pennsylvania	United States	Baptist
The Journal of Modern Ministry		JofMM	2004–present	Timeless Texts	Stanley, North Carolina	United States	
Journal of Moral Theology	2166-2851 (print) or 2166-2118 (online)			Mount St. Mary's University	Emmitsburg, Maryland	United States	Catholic
Journal of Near Eastern Studies	0022-2968	JNES	1884–present	University of Chicago Press	Chicago, Illinois	United States	Academic
Journal of Northwest Semitic Languages	0259-0131	JNSL		Association for the Study of Northwest Semitic Languages in South Africa or University of Stellenbosch	Stellenbosch	South Africa	
Journal of Orthodox Christian Studies	2574-4968		2018–present	Orthodox Christian Studies Center of Fordham University		United States	
Journal of Pastoral Care & Counseling	2167-776X	JPCC		Journal of Pastoral Care Publications	Kutztown, Pennsylvania	United States	
Journal of Pentecostal Theology	0966-7369 (print) or 1745-5251 (online)	JPT (also J. Pentecostal Theol.)	1992–present	Brill			Pentecostal, academic
Journal of Psychology & Christianity	0733-4273	JPC (also JPsycholChrist)		Christian Association for Psychological Studies			
Journal of Psychology & Theology	0091-6471	JPsycholTheol		Rosemead Graduate School of Psychology, Rosemead Graduate School of Professional Psychology			
Journal of Reformed Theology	1872-5163 (print) or 1569-7312 (online)	JRT		International Reformed Theological Institute by Brill	Amsterdam	Netherlands	
The Journal of Religion was the American Journal of Theology	0022-4189	JR	1882–present	University of Chicago Press	Chicago, Illinois	United States	
Journal of Religion and Film	1092-1311	J. Religion Film	1997–present	University of Nebraska at Omaha		United States	
Journal of Religion in Africa	0022-4200 (print) or 1570-0666 (online)	JReligionAfr		Brill	Leiden	Netherlands	
Journal of Religious & Theological Information	1528-6924	JRTI		Haworth Press, Routledge	Binghamton, New York, London	United States, United Kingdom	
Journal of Religious Ethics	0384-9694 (print) or 1467-9795 (online)	JORE	1973–present	American Academy of Religion, Harvard Divinity School, Emory University, Rutgers University, University of Tennessee - Knoxville			Academic
The Journal of The Scholarship of Teaching and Learning for Christians in Higher Education	1559-8624	SoTL-Ched		Oral Roberts University	Tulsa, Oklahoma	United States	
Journal for the Scientific Study of Religion	0021-8294	JSSR		Society for the Scientific Study of Religion, Blackwell-Wiley	Hoboken, New Jersey	United States	
Journal of Semitic Studies	0022-4480 (print) or 1477-8556 (online)	JSS		University of Manchester, Department of Middle Eastern Studies	Manchester	United Kingdom	
Journal of Spiritual Formation and Soul Care	1939-7909 (print) or 2328-1030 (online)			Talbot School of Theology (Institute for Spiritual Formation)	La Mirada, California	United States	Evangelical
Journal for the Study of the Historical Jesus	1476-8690 (print) or 1745-5197 (online)			Sheffield Academic Press or Brill Academic Publishers	London	United Kingdom	
Journal for the Study of Judaism	0047-2212 (print) or 1570-0631 (online)	JSJ		Brill Academic Publishers			
Journal for the Study of the New Testament	0142-064X (print) or 1745-5294 (online)	JSNT		SAGE Publications	Thousand Oaks, California	United States	Christian
Journal for the Study of the Old Testament	0309-0892 (print) or 1476-6728 (online)	JSOT		SAGE Publications	Thousand Oaks, California	United States	Ecumenical
Journal for the Study of the Pseudepigrapha	0951-8207 (print) or 1745-5286 (online)	JSP		SAGE Publications			
Journal for the Study of Religion	1011-7601	JSR	1980–present	Association for the Study of Religion in Southern Africa		South Africa	
Journal for the Study of Religion, Nature and Culture, the new title for Ecotheology	1749-4915	JSRNC		International Society for the Study of Religion, Nature and Culture	Winston-Salem, North Carolina 27109	United States	
Journal for the Study of Rhetorical Criticism of the New Testament		JSRCNT		Rhetorical New Testament Project of the Institute for Antiquity and Christianity	Redlands, California	United States	
Journal of Theology for Southern Africa	0047-2867	JTSA		University of KwaZulu-Natal, School of Religion and Theology	Pietermaritzburg, KwaZulu-Natal	South Africa	
Journal of Theological Interpretation	1936-0843	JTI	2007–present	Eisenbrauns	Winona Lake, Indiana 46590	United States	Academic
The Journal of Theological Studies	0022-5185 (print) or 1477-4607 (online)	JTS			Oxford	United Kingdom	
The Journal of Welsh Religious History	0967-3938	JWRH		University of Wales Press, on behalf of the Centre for the Advanced Study of Religion in Wales		Wales	Academic
Journal of Biblical Theology	1531-7919	JBT	1998–present	The American Journal of Biblical Theology	Hayesville, NC	USA	Christian

== K ==
Name	ISSN	Abbreviations	Publication years	Publisher	City, state/province	Country	Affiliation
Kerux: The Journal of Northwest Theological Seminary	0888-8513			Northwest Theological Seminary	Escondido, California	United States	Reformed
Kesher: A Journal of Messianic Judaism	1532-4974		1994–present	Union of Messianic Jewish Congregations	South Hamilton, MA	United States	Messianic Judaism
Koers - Bulletin for Christian Scholarship	0023-270X (print) or 2304-8557 (online)			Koers Association		South Africa	Academic

== L ==
Name	ISSN	Abbreviations	Publication years	Publisher	City, state/province	Country	Affiliation
La scuola cattolica	1827-529X	ScC, SC	1873–present	Ancora (Milan)	Venegono Inferiore	Italia	Catholic
Leadership Journal	0199-7661 (print) or 1551-1804 (online)			Christianity Today International	Carol Stream, Illinois	United States	
Lectio Difficilior (in German)	1661-3317	LDiff		Universität Bern, Theologische Fakultät	Bern	Switzerland	Feminist
Letter & Spirit: A Journal of Catholic Biblical Theology	1555-4147		2005–present	St. Paul Center for Biblical Theology	Steubenville, Ohio	United States	Catholic
Liber Annuus	0081-8933	LA	1951–present	Studium Biblicum Franciscanum (editorial in Italian)	Jerusalem	Israel	Catholic
Literature and Theology	0269-1205 (print) or 1477-4623 (online)		1987–present	Oxford University Press	Oxford	United Kingdom	
Louvain Studies	0024-6964	LS	1975–present	Faculty of Theology and Religious Studies, Katholieke Universiteit Leuven	Louvain/Leuven	Belgium	Catholic
The Lutheran	0024-743X			Evangelical Lutheran Church in America	Chicago	United States	Lutheran
Lutheran Quarterly (new series)	0024-7499	LQ	1987–present	Lutheran Quarterly Inc		United States	Lutheran
The Lutheran Witness				Lutheran Church–Missouri Synod		United States	Lutheran

== M ==
Name	ISSN	Abbreviations	Publication years	Publisher	City, state/province	Country	Affiliation
Maranatha Baptist Theological Journal	2160-1623			Maranatha Baptist University	Watertown, Wisconsin	United States	Baptist
The Master's Seminary Journal	1066-3959	MSJ	1990–present	The Master's Seminary	Sun Valley, Los Angeles	United States	Evangelical/Reformed
Medieval Mystical Theology: The Journal of the Eckhart Society	2046-5734			The Eckhart Society (Maney Publishing)		United Kingdom	
MAHABBAH: Journal of Religion and Education	2723-147X	MJRE	2020–present	Sekolah Tinggi Teologi Moriah	Tangerang, Banten	Indonesia	
Melita Theologica	1012-9588	MT	1947–present	Faculty of Theology, University of Malta	Msida	Malta	Catholic
Megadim	0334-8814		1986–present	Herzog College		Israel	Judaism
Melita Theologica	1012-9588	MT	1947–present	Faculty of Theology, University of Malta	Msida	Malta	Catholic
Mennonite Quarterly Review	0025-9373	MQR	1927–present	Goshen College	Goshen, Indiana	United States	Anabaptist/Mennonite
Methodist Review: A Journal of Wesleyan and Methodist Studies	1946-5254	MR	2009–present	The Methodist Review, Inc		United States	Methodist
The Methodist Review		MR	1847–1922	Methodist Episcopal Church, South	Nashville, TN	United States	Methodist
The Methodist Quarterly Review		MQR	1818–1855			United States	Methodist
Michigan Theological Journal	1048-2709			Michigan Theological Society	Oak Park, Michigan	United States	Academic
Mishkan	0792-0474		1984–present	United Christian Council in Israel or Pasche Institute of Jewish Studies	Jerusalem	Israel	Messianic Judaism
Missiology: An International Review	0091-8296			American Society of Missiology distributed by SAGE Publications Ltd.	South Pasadena, California	United States	
Missionalia: Southern African Journal of Mission Studies	0256-9507 (print) or 2312-878X (online)			Southern African Missiological Society by Unisa Press & Sabinet Online Ltd	Menlo Park 0102	South Africa	
Missions Quarterly				Seventh-day Adventist Foreign Mission Board	Washington, D.C.	United States	
Modern Believing the new title for The Modern Churchman	1353-1425 (print) or 2053-633X (online)		1994–present (with this name)	Liverpool University Press, on behalf of Modern Church	Liverpool, Merseyside	United Kingdom	
Modern Reformation				White Horse Inn		United States	Reformed
Modern Theology	0266-7177 (print) or 1468-0025 (online)			Blackwell-Wiley	Oxford	United Kingdom	Ecumenical

== N ==
Name	ISSN	Abbreviations	Publication years	Publisher	City, state/province	Country	Affiliation
Near Eastern Archaeology	1094-2076	NEA	1998–present	American Schools of Oriental Research	Philadelphia, Pennsylvania	United States	Academic
Neotestamentica	0254-8356 (print)	Neot		New Testament Society of Southern Africa		South Africa	
Neue Zeitschrift für Systematische Theologie und Religionsphilosophie	1612-9520	Neue Z. Syst. Theol. Relig.	1980–present	Walter de Gruyter			
New Blackfriars	0028-4289 (print) or 1741-2005 (online)	NB	1965–present (as "New Blackfriars")	John Wiley & Sons	New York	United States	Catholic
New Oxford Review	0149-4244		1977–present	New Oxford Review Inc.	Berkeley, California	United States	Catholic
The New Ressourcement	2995-5939 (print) or 2995-5947 (online)	TNR	2024–present	Word on Fire Academic		United States	Catholic
New Testament Abstracts	0028-6877	NTA		Catholic Biblical Association of America by Weston School of Theology or Boston College	Chestnut Hill, Massachusetts	United States	Catholic
New Testament Studies	0028-6885 (print)			Studiorum Novi Testamenti Societas; Cambridge University Press	Cambridge	United Kingdom	Christian
New Theology Review	2169-1088 (online)		1988–present	Catholic Theological Union through the Paul Bechtold Library	Wilmington, DE	United States	Catholic
Nouvelle revue théologique	0029-4845	NRT or NRTh		Institut d'Etudes theologiques	Brussels	Belgium	Catholic
Novum Testamentum	0048-1009 (print) or 1568-5365 (online)	NovT	1956–present	Brill	Leiden	Netherlands	Academic

== O ==
Name	ISSN	Abbreviations	Publication years	Publisher	City, state/province	Country	Affiliation
Occasional Papers on Religion in Eastern Europe, formerly Religion in Eastern Europe	1069-4781	OPREE	1981–present	George Fox University		United States	Academic
Old Testament Abstracts	0364-8591	OTA		Catholic Biblical Association of America	Washington, D.C. 20064	United States	Catholic
One in Christ	0030-252X			Olivetans	Turvey, Bedfordshire	United Kingdom	Catholic
Open Theology	2300-6579	OT		De Gruyter Open			Academic
Origins	0093-609X		1971–present	CNS Documentary Service	Washington, D.C.	United States	Catholic

== P ==
Name	ISSN	Abbreviations	Publication years	Publisher	City, state/province	Country	Affiliation
Pacifica	1030-570X	Pacifica	1988–2017	Pacifica Theological Studies Association	Melbourne	Australia	Academic
Palestine Exploration Quarterly	0031-0328	PEQ	1869–present	Palestine Exploration Fund	London	United Kingdom	Academic
Pastoral Review, The			1931–present	Tablet Publishing Co	London	United Kingdom	Catholic
Perichoresis - The Theological Journal of Emanuel University	2284-7304 (print) or 2284-7308 (online)	PERI		Emanuel University via De Gruyter	Oradea	Romania	Baptist
The Person and the Challenges	2083-8018 (print) or 2391-6559 (online)		2011–present	Pontifical University of John Paul II	Tarnów	Poland	Catholic
Perspectives in Religious Studies	0093-531X	PRSt	1974–present	National Association of Baptist Professors of Religion & Baylor University Press		United States	
Perspectives on Science and Christian Faith	0892-2675	PSCF	1987–present	American Scientific Affiliation	Ipswich, Massachusetts 01938	United States	
Philotheos	2620-0163		2001–2023	Gnomon Center for the Humanities	Belgrade	Serbia	
Philosophy and Theology	0890-2461 (print) or 2153-828X (online)	Philos. Theol.	1986–present	Philosophy Documentation Center	Charlottesville, Virginia	United States	Academic
Phronema	0819-4920		1986–present	St Andrew's Greek Orthodox Theological College	Redfern, New South Wales	Australia	Eastern Orthodox
Pneuma: The Journal of the Society for Pentecostal Studies	0272-0965 (print) or 1570-0747 (online)	Pneuma	1970–present	Society for Pentecostal Studies by Brill Publishers	Leiden	Netherlands	Pentecostal
Political Theology	1462-317X (print) or 1743-1719 (online)			Maney Publishing	Philadelphia, Pennsylvania 19102	United States	
Practical Papers for the Bible Translator (alternative title for The Bible Translator)	0260-0943	BT		United Bible Societies		United Kingdom	
Preaching	0862-7036			Salem Communications	Camarillo, California 93012	United States	
Presbyterion: Covenant Seminary Review	0193-6212		1975–present	Covenant Theological Seminary	St. Louis, Missouri	United States	Reformed
The Princeton Theological Review	1945-4813	PTR (also Princet. Theol. Rev.)	1825–1929, 1990s–present	MacCalla & Co	Philadelphia, Pennsylvania	United States	
Priscilla Papers	0898-753X	Priscilla Pap.	1987–present	Christians for Biblical Equality	Minneapolis, Minnesota 55404	United States	
Pro Ecclesia: A Journal of Catholic and Evangelical Theology	1063-8512			Center for Catholic and Evangelical Theology by Rowman & Littlefield	Washington, D.C. 20008	United States	Catholic
Protestant Reformed Theological Journal	1070-8138 (print) or 2373-2091 (digital)	PRTJ	1967–present	Protestant Reformed Theological School	Grandville, MI	United States	Reformed
Puritan Reformed Journal	1946–8652	PRJ	2009–present	Puritan Reformed Theological Seminary	Grand Rapids, Michigan	United States	Reformed

== Q ==
Name	ISSN	Abbreviations	Publication years	Publisher	City, state/province	Country	Affiliation
Quodlibet Journal: Online Journal of Christian Theology and Philosophy	1526-6575		1999–present	Scott Foutz			Academic
Quaker Studies	1363-013X (print) or 2397-1770 (online)		1996–present	Liverpool University Press with the Centre for Research in Quaker Studies at Woodbrooke and the American Academy of Religion Quaker Studies Group	Liverpool, Merseyside	United Kingdom	Quaker
QUAERENS: Journal of Theology and Christianity Studies	2722-0753	QJTC	2020–present	Sekolah Tinggi Teologi Widya Agape	Jakarta	Indonesia	Interdenominational

== R ==
Name	ISSN	Abbreviations	Publication years	Publisher	City, state/province	Country	Affiliation
Reformation	1357-4175 (print) or 1752-0738 (online)		1996–present	Equinox		United Kingdom	
Reformation and Renaissance Review	1462-2459			Equinox			
Reformation & Revival	1071-7277			Reformation & Revival Ministries	Carol Stream, Illinois	United States	
Reformation Today	0034-3048			Reformation Today	Leeds, Yorkshire	United Kingdom	Reformed
Reformed Baptist Theological Review		RBTR	2004–2011	Reformed Baptist Academic Press	Palmdale, California	United States	Reformed Baptist
The Reformed Presbyterian became The Reformed Presbyterian and Covenanter			1837-1862	W.S. Haven	Pittsburgh, PA	United States	Reformed
The Reformed Presbyterian and Covenanter, formerly The Reformed Presbyterian and Covenanter			1863-1895		Pittsburgh, PA	United States	Reformed
Reformed Presbyterian Theological Journal	2377-7680		2014–present	Reformed Presbyterian Theological Seminary	Pittsburgh, PA	United States	Reformed
Reformed Review	0034-3064	RefRev	1955–2009	Western Theological Seminary	Holland, MI	United States	Reformed
Reformed Theological Journal	0268-4772		1985–present	Reformed Theological College	Belfast	Northern Ireland	Reformed
Reformed Theological Review	0034-3072	RTR	1942–present	Reformed Theological Society (Australia)		Australia	Reformed
Religion and American Culture	1052-1151 (print) or 1533-8568 (online)	Religion Am. Cult.	1991–present	University of California Press	Berkeley, California	United States	Christian
Religious and Theological Abstracts	2162-7592	RTA	1958–present	Religious and Theological Abstracts, Inc.	Myerstown, Pennsylvania	United States	
Restoration Quarterly	0486-5642	ResQ	1957–present	The Restoration Quarterly Corporation	Abilene, Texas	United States	Churches of Christ
Review of Biblical Literature	1099-0321	RBL	1998–present	Society of Biblical Literature	Loveland, Colorado 80538	United States	
Review & Expositor	0034-6373 (print) or 2052-9449 (online)	RevExp	1904–present	Review & Expositor, Inc. by SAGE Publications	Louisville, Kentucky	United States	Baptist
Review of Rabbinic Judaism: Ancient, Medieval, and Modern (Formerly: The Annual of Rabbinic Judaism)	1568-4857 (print) or 1570-0704 (online)		1998–present	Brill	Leiden	Netherlands	Judaism Academic
Review of Religious Research	0034-673X (print) or 2211-4866 (online)	RRR	1959–present	Religious Research Association			Academic
Reviews in Religion & Theology	1467-9418			Blackwell-Wiley			Ecumenical
Reviews in Science and Religion	1754-4742			Religion and Science Forum	Birmingham	United Kingdom	Academic
Revue Biblique	0035-0907		1892–present	École biblique et archéologique	Jerusalem	Israel	Catholic
Revue de Qumran	0035-1725	RdQ					
Revue d'Histoire Ecclesiastique	0035-2381	RHE	1900–present	Université Catholique de Louvain	Louvain	France	Catholic
Revue d'Histoire et de Philosophie Religieuses^{(fr)} (in French)	0035-2403	RHPR		Faculté de Théologie Protestante de Strasbourg	Strasbourg	France	Protestant
Rivista Biblica (in Italian)		RivBib			Bologna	Italy	

== S ==
Name	ISSN	Abbreviations	Publication years	Publisher	City, state/province	Country	Affiliation
Scandinavian Journal of the Old Testament	0901-8328	Scan. J. Old Testam.	1985–present	Taylor & Francis	Oslo	Norway	
Science and Christian Belief	0954-4194		1989–present	Paternoster Press		United Kingdom	
Scottish Bulletin of Evangelical Theology	0265-4539	SBET	1983–present	Highland Theological College	Edinburgh	United Kingdom	Evangelical
Scottish Journal of Theology	0036-9306 (print) or 1475-3065 (online)	SJT	1948–present	Cambridge University Press	Cambridge	United Kingdom	Evangelical
Scripta Theologica	0036-9764	ScriptTheol	1969–present	Universidad de Navarra	Pamplona	Spain	Catholic
Semeia	0095-571X (print) or 2168-3697 (online)	Semeia	1972–2002	Society of Biblical Literature	Atlanta, Georgia	United States	Academic
Semeia Studies (n.b. more a book series)	1567-200X	SemeiaSt	2002–present	Society of Biblical Literature	Atlanta, Georgia	United States	Academic
Sewanee Theological Review				School of Theology, University of the South		United States	Episcopalian
The Shaker Quarterly	0582-9348		1961—1996	Sabbathday Lake Shaker Village	Poland, Maine	United States	Shaker
Sobornost	0144-8722		1935–present	Fellowship of St Alban and St Sergius		United Kingdom	
Shofar: An Interdisciplinary Journal of Jewish Studies	1534-5165 (print) 0882-8539 (online)	Shofar	1982–present	Purdue University Press		United States	Judaism
Socio-Historical Examination of Religion and Ministry	2637-7519 (print) 2637-7500 (online)	SHERM	2019–present	Wipf and Stock		International	Academic
South African Baptist Journal of Theology	1019-7990	SABJT	1992–present	Baptist Union of Southern Africa	Cape Town	South Africa	Baptist
Southeastern Theological Review	2156-9401	STR	2010–present	Southeastern Baptist Theological Seminary	Wake Forest, North Carolina	United States	Baptist
Southern Baptist Journal of Theology	1520-7307	SBJT	1997–present	Southern Baptist Theological Seminary	Louisville, Kentucky	United States	Baptist
Southern Reformed Theological Journal	ISBN 1539911748	SRTJ	2017–present	Southern Reformed College and Seminary	Houston, Texas	United States	Southern Reformed
Southwestern Journal of Theology	0038-4828	SWJT	1958–present	Southwestern Baptist Theological Seminary	Fort Worth, Texas	United States	Evangelical
Spiritus	1533-1709 (print) or 1535-3117 (online)	Spiritus	1993–present	Johns Hopkins University Press	Baltimore, Maryland	United States	Catholic
Springfielder	0884-2825	Springfielder	1937–1959 by Concordia Theological Seminary; 1960–present by Lutheran Church–Missouri Synod	Lutheran Church–Missouri Synod	Springfield, Illinois	United States	Lutheran
The Spurgeon Fellowship Journal	(online only)	TSFJ		Western Seminary		United States	Baptist
St. Mark's Review	0036-3103	SMR	1955–present	St Mark's National Theological Centre	Barton, Canberra, ACT 2600	Australia	Anglican
St. Nersess Theological Review		SNTR	1996–present	St. Nersess Armenian Seminary		United States	Armenian Orthodox
St. Vladimir's Theological Quarterly	0036-3227	SVTQ		Saint Vladimir's Seminary Press	Yonkers, New York	United States	Eastern Orthodox
Stromata	0049-2353			Universidad del Salvador	San Miguel, Buenos Aires	Argentina	
Stromata: The Graduate Journal of Calvin Theological Seminary	2476-1095 (print) or 2476-1109 (online)	Stromata	1956–present	Calvin Theological Seminary	Grand Rapids, Michigan	United States	Christian Reformed
Studia Evangelica	0585-5144	SE	1959–1982	Akademie-Verlag	Berlin	Germany	
Studia Liturgica	0039-3207	SL		Societas Liturgica	Rotterdam	Netherlands	Academic
Studia Theologica: Nordic Journal of Theology	0039-338X (print) or 1502-7791 (online)	ST		Nordic Theological Faculties	Oslo	Norway	
Studia Theologica	1212-8570		1999–present	Palacký University - Sts Cyril and Methodius Theological faculty	Olomouc	Czech Republic	Catholic
Studies in Christian Ethics	0953-9468 (print) or 1745-5235 (online)	StudChristEthics	1988–present	Society for the Study of Christian Ethics by SAGE Publications		United Kingdom	
Studies in Christian-Jewish Relations	1930-3777	SCJR	2005–present	Center for Christian-Jewish Learning, Boston College	Chestnut Hill, MA	United States	Ecumenical
Studies in Church History	0424-2084 (print) or 2059-0644 (online)			Ecclesiastical History Society by Cambridge University Press			
Studies in Spirituality	0926-6453 (print) or 1783-1814 (online)	StSpir		Titus Brandsma Institute by Peeters Publishers		Netherlands	Catholic
Studies in World Christianity	1354-9901 (print) or 1750-0230 (online)	StudWorldChr	1995–present	Edinburgh University Press	Edinburgh	United Kingdom	Christian
Svensk exegetisk årsbok	1100-2298	SEÅ	1936–present	Eisenbrauns	Uppsala	Sweden	Academic

== T ==
Name	ISSN	Abbreviations	Publication years	Publisher	City, state/province	Country	Affiliation
TC: A Journal of Biblical Textual Criticism	1089-7747	TC		Scholars Press	Atlanta, Georgia	United States	
Technical Papers for the Bible Translator (alternative title for The Bible Translator)	0260-0935			United Bible Societies		United Kingdom	
Texte und Untersuchungen zur Geschichte der altchristlichen Literatur							
The Theological Review (Revista Teologică)	2069-8895		1907–present	Faculty of Theology of the Lucian Blaga University of Sibiu	Sibiu	Romania	Eastern Orthodox
Theological Students Fellowship Bulletin (became Themelios below)		TSF Bull		Theological Students Fellowship	Leicester	United Kingdom	
Themelios (was the Theological Students Fellowship Bulletin)	0307-8388	Them	1962–present	The Gospel Coalition since 2008; formerly RTSF/UCCF	Leicester	United Kingdom	Reformed
Theological Studies	0040-5639	TheolStud or TS	1940–present	Society of Jesus in the United States and Marquette University and SAGE Publications		United States	
Theological Studies/Teologiese Studies	0259-9422 (print) or 2072-8050 (online)		1942–present	University of Pretoria by AOSIS OpenJournals	Pretoria	South Africa	
Theologische Rundschau	0040-5698 (print) or 1868-727X (online)	ThR		Mohr Siebeck GmbH	Tübingen	German	
Theology		Theol			London	United Kingdom	
Theology and Philosophy of Education	2788-1180	TAPE	2022–present	The Czech Christian Academy, Pedagogical Section	Prague	Czech Republic	
Theology and Science	1474-6700 (Print) or 1474-6719 (online)			Center for Theology and the Natural Sciences by Taylor & Francis			
Theology & Sexuality	1355-8358 (print) or 1745-5170 (online)			Affiliated to the Centre for the Study of Christianity and Sexuality by Equinox Publications	London	United Kingdom	
Theology Digest	0040-5728	TD		Saint Louis University	St. LouisSaint Louis, Missouri	United States	Christian
Theology of Leadership Journal	2578-4072	TLJ		Theology of Leadership Journal	Georgia	United States	Christian
Theological Reflections				Odesa Theological Seminary	Odesa	Ukraine	Christian, Baptist
Theology Today	0040-5736 (print) or 2044-2556 (online)	TToday	1944–present	Princeton Theological Seminary	Princeton, New Jersey	United States	
Third Way	0309-3492		1977–2016	Hymns Ancient & Modern Ltd	London	United Kingdom	Evangelical
Toronto Journal of Theology	0826-9831 (print) or 1918-6371 (online)	TJT		University of Toronto Press	Toronto	Canada	
Touchstone: A Journal of Mere Christianity				Fellowship of St. James	Chicago, Illinois	United States	Christian
Traditio	2166-5508			Fordham University Press	New York City, New York	United States	
Transform Journal		TJ	2021–present	Transform	Nairobi	Kenya	Wesleyan
Transformation	0265-3788 (print) or 1759-8931 (online)	Transformation		Oxford Centre for Mission Studies by SAGE Publications	Oxford	United Kingdom	
Trinity Journal	0360-3032	TrinJ	1980–present	Trinity Evangelical Divinity School	Bannockburn, IL	United States	Evangelical
Tyndale Bulletin	0082-7118	TB	1956–present	Tyndale House	Cambridge	United Kingdom	Evangelical
Tyndale Society Journal	1357-4167			Tyndale Society	Oxford	United Kingdom	

== U ==
Name	ISSN	Abbreviations	Publication years	Publisher	City, state/province	Country	Affiliation
Unio cum Christo: An International Journal of Reformed Theology and Life	2380-5412 (online)		2015–present	Westminster Theological Seminary & International Reformed Evangelical Seminary	Philadelphia, Pennsylvania and Jakarta, Indonesia	United States & Indonesia	Reformed
Union Seminary Quarterly Review	0362-1545	USQR or Union Semin. Q. Rev.	1939–present	Union Theological Seminary in the City of New York	New York City	United States	Ecumenical

== V ==
Name	ISSN	Abbreviations	Publication years	Publisher	City, state/province	Country	Affiliation
Vetus Testamentum	0042-4935 (print) or 1568-5330 (online)	VT	1951–present	Brill Publishers			
Vigiliae Christianae	0042-6032 (print) or 1570-0720 (online)	VC	1947–present	Brill Publishers			
Vox Evangelica	0263-6786	VE	1962–1997	London Bible College (now the London School of Theology)	London	United Kingdom	Evangelical
Vox Reformata	0728-0912		1962–present	Reformed Theological College, Australia	Geelong, Victoria	Australia	Reformed
Valley View University Journal of Theology	2026-612X		2011–present	Valley View University	Accra	Ghana	

== W ==
Name	ISSN	Abbreviations	Publication years	Publisher	City, state/province	Country	Affiliation
Westminster Journal of Theology		WJT					
Westminster Theological Journal	0043-4388	WTJ	1939–present	Westminster Theological Seminary	Philadelphia, Pennsylvania	United States	Reformed
Whitefield Briefings (became Ethics in Brief)				Whitefield Institute	Cambridge	United Kingdom	Evangelical
Wisconsin Lutheran Quarterly	0362-5648		1990–present	Wisconsin Lutheran Seminary	Milwaukee, Wisconsin	United States	
Women in Judaism	1209-9392			Women in Judaism Incorporated	Thornhill, Ontario	Canada	Judaism
World & World: Theology for Christian Ministry	0275-5270			Luther Seminary	St. Paul, Minnesota	United States	Lutheran
Worship	0043-941X	Worship		Benedictines of Saint John's Abbey	Collegeville, Minnesota	United States	Catholic

== Z ==
Name	ISSN	Abbreviations	Publication years	Publisher	City, state/province	Country	Affiliation
Zeitschrift für die alttestamentliche Wissenschaft	0934-2575 (print) or 1613-0103 (online)	ZATW or ZAW		Walter de Gruyter	Berlin	Germany	Ecumenical
Zeitschrift für die Neutestamentliche Wissenschaft	0044-2615 (print) or 1613-009X (online)	ZNW		Walter de Gruyter	Berlin	Germany	Christian

== See also ==
- Lists of academic journals
