= Horizons (journal) =

Horizons: The Journal of the College Theology Society
- Discipline: Theology, religious studies
- Language: English
- Edited by: Elena Procario-Foley

Publication details
- History: 1974-present
- Publisher: Cambridge University Press on behalf of the College Theology Society, Villanova University (United States)
- Frequency: Biannual

Standard abbreviations
- ISO 4: Horizons

Indexing
- ISSN: 0360-9669 (print); 2050-8557 (web)
- LCCN: 77648693
- OCLC no.: 858609197

Links
- Journal homepage; Online access; Online archive

Horizons: The Journal of the College Theology Society is a biannual peer-reviewed academic journal established in 1974 and published by Cambridge University Press on behalf of the College Theology Society. The Journal is based at Villanova University. While rooted in the Catholic tradition of "faith seeking understanding", the journal covers a range of topics in theology and religious studies, including Catholic theology, as well as Christianity and religious experience more generally. The editor-in-chief is Elena Procario-Foley (Iona College), and associate editors are Gerald Beyer (Villanova University) and Christopher Denny (St. John's University, Queens).

== Abstracting and indexing ==
The journal is abstracted and indexed in:

- Arts and Humanities Citation Index
- Scopus
- ATLA Religion Database
- ATLA Catholic Periodical & Literature Index
- Index Theologicus
- New Testament Abstracts
- Religious and Theological Abstracts
