= Scripta Theologica =

- Discipline: Theology, biblical theology, systematic theology, patristics, liturgy
- Language: Spanish
- Edited by: César Izquierdo

Publication details
- History: 1969–present
- Publisher: University of Navarra (Spain)
- Frequency: Triannually

Standard abbreviations
- ISO 4: Scr. Theol.

Indexing
- ISSN: 0036-9764
- OCLC no.: 645096053

Links
- Journal homepage; Online abstracts

Scripta Theologica is a Spanish triannual academic journal of theology established in 1969 and published by the School of Theology of the University of Navarra. The editor-in-chief is César Izquierdo.

== Abstracting and indexing ==
Scripta Theologica is abstracted and indexed in:

- Scopus
- ATLA Religion Database
- EBSCO databases
- LATINDEX
- FRANCIS
- Index Theologicus
- Index to Book Reviews in Religion
- Old Testament Abstracts
- Base d'Information Bibliographique en Patristique
- Religion Index One
- Religious and Theological Abstracts
