= Stala =

Stala is a surname. Notable people with the surname include:

- Dave Stala (born 1979), Canadian football player
- Józef Stala (1966–2025), Polish theologian

== See also ==
- Sampsa Astala
