= Robert A. Cathey =

American theologian

Robert Andrew Cathey is an American theologian and professor emeritus of theology at McCormick Theological Seminary in Chicago, Illinois.

He is affiliated with the Presbyterian Church and has worked in the areas of ecumenical and interfaith dialogue, Christian theological education, and the academic study of postliberal and interreligious theology.

His scholarly work has appeared in academic and theological journals, including Studies in Christian-Jewish Relation, Modern Theology, The Review of Metaphysics, Interpretation, Ars Disputandi, Currents in Theology and Mission, Ecumenical Trends and McCormick Notes.

== Biography ==
Cathey earned a Master of Divinity degree from Princeton Theological Seminary before enrolling in the graduate theology program at Union Theological Seminary in New York City in 1981. His studies at Union focused on theology within the broader context of contemporary theological movements. In 1983 he transferred to Duke University to continue his studies with Geoffrey Wainwright, where he completed his Ph.D. in Religion in 1989.

He has taught at institutions, including the Near East School of Theology in Beirut, Lebanon; Monmouth College in Illinois, where he also served as Chaplain and Chair of the Department of Philosophy and Religious Studies; Davidson College; and William Paterson University in New Jersey.

In 1998, Cathey joined the faculty of McCormick Theological Seminary and was named Professor of Theology in 2008. He retired as Professor Emeritus in the early 2020s.

Cathey is a past president of the American Theological Society Midwest and a member of the Center of Theological Inquiry.

He was also the first convener of the Society for Scriptural Reasoning from 1996 to 1999, which fosters interreligious engagement among Jewish, Christian, and Muslim scholars through shared scriptural interpretation.

== Academic work and research ==
Cathey's academic focus includes classical Christian doctrines interpreted through modern and postmodern perspectives, religious pluralism, and ecumenical theology. His work also emphasizes the intersection of spirituality and theological formation, especially within Christian-Jewish and Christian-Muslim dialogue.

He is the author of God in Postliberal Perspective: Between Realism and Non-Realism and has contributed chapters to various edited volumes and theological commentaries, including the Feasting on the Word lectionary series. His essays and reviews have appeared in The Christian Century, Modern Theology, The Review of Metaphysics, Interpretation, Currents in Theology and Mission, Theological Education, and Pro Ecclesia.

Cathey has been involved in interreligious work, including participation in the Parliament of the World's Religions since 2001.

He served on the Ecumenical and Inter-Religious Work Group of the Presbytery of Chicago and is a member of the Christian Leadership Initiative sponsored by the American Jewish Committee and the Shalom Hartman Institute in Jerusalem.

He was a co-author of the 2015 document, "…in our time…," which addressed Presbyterian–Jewish relations in Chicago on the fiftieth anniversary of the Vatican II declaration, Nostra Aetate. The document emerged partly in response to the Presbyterian Church (USA)'s divestment debates involving corporations operating in Israel and the Palestinian territories.

He appeared in the Presbyterian Church (USA)'s video series, "Everyday God-talk," where he discussed the role of silence, meditation, and prayer in shaping theological identity.

Cathey has drawn influence from both Christian mystics and contemporary interfaith dialogue. He has reflected publicly on the importance of spiritual formation in theological education and has likened aspects of his contemplative retirement to the rhythms of Henry David Thoreau's nature-based spiritual practice.

He has co-edited academic volumes, including Righting Relations after the Holocaust and Vatican II: Essays in Honor of John T. Pawlikowski (Paulist Press, 2018).
