= Evangelical Review of Theology and Politics =

- Discipline: Theology
- Language: English

Publication details
- History: 2012–2025
- Frequency: annually

Standard abbreviations
- ISO 4: Evang. Rev. Theol. Politics

Indexing
- ISSN: 2053-6763

Links
- Journal homepage

The Evangelical Review of Theology and Politics is a peer-reviewed, scholarly theological journal formerly published by the King's Evangelical Divinity School in England, but is now published by Stephen M. Vantassel United States. It is published annually with content being provided as available in electronic format delivered online. The journal is open-access meaning that authors and readers do not have to pay to access content. The journal defined its scope as "scholarly evangelical analysis of contemporary theological and political issues". While the journal has evangelical Christian roots, it does not require theological agreement of writers and submitters. The journal is open to all authors of all faith traditions who have meaningful and researched information on theological and/or political issues. The journal has closed in 2025.

Book reviews are likewise open-access.

It replaced by a similar journal Evangelical Review of Society and Politics and published by the same source.
