= ERSP =

ERSP may refer to:

- Estonian National Independence Party (Eesti Rahvusliku Sõltumatuse Partei)
- Estonian Radical Socialist Party (Eesti Radikaalsotsialistlik Partei)
- Evangelical Review of Society and Politics
- Electronic retailing self-regulation program
