= Thomas H. Olbricht =

American professor (1929–2020)

Thomas H. Olbricht (3 November 1929 – 21 August 2020) was Distinguished Professor Emeritus of Religion at Pepperdine University, an American scholar of ancient, especially Aristotelian, rhetoric and of the Bible and Christian history and theology, a university professor and administrator, a prolific author of scholarly and popular books and articles, an influential leader in the Churches of Christ, and a memoirist.

== Biography and education ==
Olbricht was born 3 November 1929 to Benjamin Joseph Olbricht (1885–1978) and Agnes Martha Taylor Olbricht (1898–1978) in Thayer, Missouri. He attended Thayer Elementary School and Alton High School and received his higher education at Northern Illinois University (B.S., 1951), the University of Iowa (M.A., 1953; Ph.D., 1959), and Harvard Divinity School (S.T.B., 1962). He received an honorary doctorate from Pepperdine in 2011. He was married on 8 June 1951 in Madison, Wisconsin, to the former Dorothy Jetta Kiel (born 31 August 1931 in Blanchardville, Wisconsin). Olbricht died on 21 August 2020 and was survived by his wife, five children, twelve grandchildren, and five great-grandchildren.

== Academic career ==
Olbricht taught speech at Harding University (1954–55), the University of Dubuque (1955–59), where he also chaired the department, and Pennsylvania State University (1962–67). He taught Bible and theology at Abilene Christian University (1967–86), also serving as Dean of the College of Liberal and Fine Arts (1981–85), and at Pepperdine University (1986–1996), where he also served as Chair of the Religion Division, being named Distinguished Professor of Religion in 1994.

== Publications ==
Olbricht's books include:

- Informative Speaking (1968);
- The Power to Be (1979; rev. ed. 2003);
- He Loves Forever (1980; rev. eds. 2000 and 2013);
- The Message of the New Testament: Ephesians–Colossians (1983);
- Hearing God's Voice: My Life with Scripture in the Churches of Christ (1996);
- His Love Compels (2000);
- Lifted Up, John 18–21: Crucifixion, Resurrection and Community in John (2005);
- Life Together: The Heart of Love and Fellowship in 1 John (2006);
- Reflections on My Life in the Kingdom and the Academy (2012);
- Missouri Memories 1934-1947 (2016); and
- Profiles of Notable Missourians for the Bicentennial (2019).

Collections of his essays have been published on the history of biblical interpretation in North America (2018, ed. John T. Fitzgerald), on the Stone-Campbell Restoration Movement (2018, ed. Stanley Helton and Michael Strickland), and on rhetoric and Scripture (2019, ed. Lauri Thurén). Olbricht published more than 180 dictionary and encyclopedia articles in the fields of rhetoric, biblical studies, church history, theology, and ethics. A selection of Olbricht's essays and addresses is available through the Abilene Christian University Digital Commons.

Olbricht co-edited the following volumes:

- Rhetoric and the New Testament, with Stanley E. Porter (1993);
- Rhetoric, Scripture, and Theology, with Stanley E. Porter (1996);
- The Rhetorical Analysis of Scripture, with Stanley E. Porter (1997);
- The Quest for Christian Unity, Peace, and Purity in Thomas Campbell’s Declaration and Address, with Hans Rollmann (2000);
- Paul and Pathos, with Jerry L. Sumney (2001);
- Rhetorical Argumentation in Biblical Texts, with Anders Eriksson and Walter Übelacker (2002);
- Festschriften honoring Abraham J. Malherbe (Early Christianity and Classical Culture, with John T. Fitzgerald and L. Michael White, 2003) and James W. Thompson (Renewing Tradition, with Mark W. Hamilton and Jeffrey Peterson, 2007);
- Scholarship, Pepperdine University, and the Legacy of Churches of Christ: A Primer for Faculty, Staff, and Students, with Richard T. Hughes (2004);
- the memorial volumes And the Word Became Flesh: Studies in History, Communication, and Scripture in Memory of Michael W. Casey(with David Fleer, 2016) and Grace and Peace: Essays in Memory of David Worley(with Stan Reid, 2017);
- Bat, Scalpel, Sheepskin, Beneath the Cross: Narratives on the Life of Gail Eason Hopkins, with Leah G. Hopkins (2018);
- History of the Restoration Movement in Illinois in the 19th Century, with James L. McMillan (2019); and
- Those who Stayed the Course: Autobiographies of Fifteen Churches of Christ Professionals, with Gayle M. Crowe (2019).

== Professional activities ==
Olbricht served as editor, associate editor, or editorial board member of several academic journals. These include Restoration Quarterly (1973–2020), Philosophy and Rhetoric (1968–98), Speech Monographs (1964–67), Quarterly Journal of Speech (1968–71), Southern Journal of Speech (1974–77), Journal of Greco-Roman Christianity and Judaism (1998–2020), and A Rhetorical History of the United States (2007–20).

Otlbricht was the founding director (1981–97) of the Christian Scholars Conference, an annual ecumenical scholarly gathering at Lipscomb University, other universities associated with Churches of Christ, and, in recent years, Lanier Theological Library. In 2013, this conference was renamed the Thomas H. Olbricht Christian Scholars Conference in his honor. He also founded the Conference on the Rhetorical Criticism of Biblical Documents in Heidelberg in 1992, with subsequent conferences in Pretoria (1994), London (1995), Malibu (1996), Florence (1998), Lund (2000), Heidelberg (2002), and South Africa (2004).

Throughout his career in higher education, Olbricht was active as a leader in the Churches of Christ. He served as minister for congregations in DeKalb, Illinois (1949–51), Iowa City, Iowa (1951–54), Dubuque, Iowa (1956–58), Natick, Massachusetts (1959–62), and State College, Pennsylvania (1965–67), and as elder for the Minter Lane Church of Christ, Abilene, Texas (1974–86) and the Malibu Church of Christ, Malibu, California (1989–96). Within Churches of Christ, Olbricht is known especially for his teaching and writing on Scriptural interpretation, or “hermeneutics.”
