= William Gibson (historian) =

English historian, academic, and professor

William Thomas Gibson FRHistS (born 1959) is an English historian and professor who specialises in the history of religion in Britain in the early modern period.

== Education ==
He received BA(Hons) MA (Wales), PGCE (Oxon), PhD (Middlesex), DLitt (Wales), FRHistS, FRSA, FBS. He was educated at Huish's Grammar School, Taunton, Somerset; St David's University College, Lampeter (now the Lampeter campus of the University of Wales Trinity Saint David), Lincoln College, Oxford, and Middlesex University.

== Biography ==
He initially worked as a teacher in a comprehensive school before holding posts in further education colleges in Southampton and Basingstoke. He was also an inspector in the post-compulsory sector for some years. In 1999-2000 he was Hartley Fellow at Southampton University and in 2004 was appointed Academic Director for Lifelong Learning at Westminster Institute of Education, Oxford Brookes University. In 2006 he was awarded the title Professor.

Gibson has been described as ‘one of that school of ecclesiastical historians... which in the late twentieth century has given fresh impetus and vitality to the revisionist view of the eighteenth-century Church...’ (John Guy in Journal of Welsh Religious History, 1997) Gibson's championing of the ‘optimistic’ view of the eighteenth century Church has drawn criticism from historians. The debate has been most recently aired in Reviews in History (Institute of Historical Research London, ). His biography of Benjamin Hoadly, though generally well received, has been viewed as an overly strong statement of the optimist's defence of a latitudinarian bishop (“a valuable if perhaps slightly overstated reappraisal of one of the foremost pillars of the Georgian religious establishment” –Robin Eagles "The Eighteenth Century" in Annual Bulletin of Historical Literature, December 2006.)

In February 2008 he was appointed as Director of the Oxford Centre for Methodism and Church History. In October 2009 he was visiting fellow at Baylor University, Texas. In April 2011 he was visiting fellow at Yale University. In 2019–2020, he was visiting professor at Clermont Auvergne University.

== Writings ==
His books include, Church, State and Society, 1760-1850 (Macmillans, 1994); The Achievement of the Anglican Church, 1689-1800: The Confessional State in England in the Eighteenth Century, (Edwin Mellen Press, 1995); A Social History of the Domestic Chaplain, 1530-1840, (Leicester University Press/Cassell, 1996); Religion and Society in England and Wales, 1689-1800, (Leicester UP/Cassell, 1998); The Church of England 1688-1832: Unity and Accord, (Routledge, 2001); The Enlightenment Bishop: Benjamin Hoadly 1676-1761, (James Clarke & Co, 2004); Religion and the Enlightenment 1600-1800: Conflict and the Rise of Civic Humanism in Taunton, (Peter Lang, 2007). He is the author of numerous articles.
