= Christoph Schwöbel =

German theologian (1955–2021)

- Born: 19 February 1955; Frankfurt am Main
- Died: 18 September 2021 (aged 66)
- Education: Lutheran Theology and Philosophy
- Occupations: Lutheran Theologian; Professor of Systematic Theology

Christoph Schwöbel (19 February 1955 – 18 September 2021) was a German Lutheran Theologian and Professor of Systematic Theology at the University of St Andrews, Scotland.

== Life ==
Christoph Schwöbel was born in Frankfurt am Main. He studied Lutheran Theology and Philosophy at the Kirchliche Hochschule, Bethel, and at Philipps-Universität Marburg.He received his doctorate in 1978 in Marburg and qualified there as a professor, through his Habilitation, in 1990. He was ordained a minister of the North Elbian Evangelical Lutheran Church in 1994.

Christoph Schwöbel was Lecturer for Systematic Theology at King's College London from 1986 to 1993 and in 1988 founded the Research Institute in Systematic Theology (RIST), serving as its Director until 1993.

Subsequently, he taught as professor of systematic theology at Christian-Albrechts-Universität zu Kiel from 1993 to 1999. This was followed by a professorship of systematic and ecumenical theology at the Faculty of Theology of Ruprecht-Karls-Universität Heidelberg from 1999 to 2004, where he was also director of the Ecumenical Institute. From October 2004 to July 2018, he was Professor of Systematic Theology at the Faculty of Protestant Theology at Eberhard Karls Universität Tübingen.

His focus was in the area of fundamental theology and philosophy of religion. In connection with the topic of creationism, Schwöbel provided a scholarly theoretical analysis. He considered the juxtaposition natural science versus faith used by many ideological evolutionists in the debate with creationism to be self-defeating, and pointed out

that the natural sciences themselves create their own relations of authority, which are justified by the already always theory-laden character of the concept of experience and by the fact that they operate in theoretical paradigms that give them their authoritative status.

Schwöbel was also director of the Institute for Hermeneutics and Dialogue of Cultures. He edited the journal Neue Zeitschrift für Systematische Theologie und Religionsphilosophie.

He was a member of the scientific advisory board of the interdisciplinary research center Key Concepts in Interreligious Discourses (KCID) at the Friedrich-Alexander University of Erlangen-Nuremberg.

In September 2018, Schwöbel succeeded the English theologian John Webster as Chair of Divinity at the University of St Andrews, established in 1643.

== Academic works ==
- Martin Rade. Das Verhältnis von Geschichte, Religion und Moral als Grundproblem seiner Theologie. Gütersloh 1980.
- ed.: Karl Barth – Martin Rade. Ein Briefwechsel, Mit einer Einleitung. Gütersloh 1981.
- Gottes Stimme und die Demokratie. Theologische Unterstützung für das neue demokratische System. In: Richard Ziegert (Hrsg.): Die Kirchen und die Weimarer Republik. Neukirchener Verlag, Neukirchen-Vluyn 1994, S. 37–68.
- ed. with Colin Gunton: Persons: Divine and Human, King´s College Essays in Theological Anthropology. Edinburgh 1991, 2nd ed. 1999.
- God: Action and Revelation (= Studies in Philosophical Theology; 3). Kampen 1992.
- ed. (for the Research Institute in Systematic Theology): Trinitarian Theology Today. Essays on Divine Being and Act. Edinburgh 1995.
- Gott in Beziehung. Studien zur Dogmatik. Tübingen 2002.
- Christlicher Glaube im Pluralismus. Studien zu einer Theologie der Kultur. Tübingen 2003.
- ed.with Friedrich Schweitzer: Aufgaben, Gestalt und Zukunft Theologischer Fakultäten. Gütersloh 2007.
- ed. with Friedrich Schweitzer: Religion – Toleranz – Bildung. Neukirchen-Vluyn 2007.
- Die Religion des Zauberers. Theologisches in den großen Romanen Thomas Manns. Tübingen 2008.
- ed. with Bernd Janowski, Friedrich Schweitzer: Schöpfungsglaube vor der Herausforderung des Kreationismus. Neukirchener, Neukirchen-Vluyn 2010.
- Gott im Gespräch: theologische Studien zur Gegenwartsdeutung. Tübingen 2011.
