= Transformation (journal) =

- Discipline: Mission, theology, biblical studies
- Language: English
- Edited by: Paul Woods. Previously, David Emmanuel Singh

Publication details
- History: 1984–present
- Publisher: SAGE Publications
- Frequency: Quarterly

Standard abbreviations
- ISO 4: Transformation

Indexing
- ISSN: 0265-3788 (print); 1759-8931 (web)
- LCCN: sf94091143
- OCLC no.: 11004341

Links
- Journal homepage; Online access; Online archive

Transformation is a quarterly peer-reviewed academic journal that publishes papers in the field of Mission studies. The journal's editor-in-chief is Paul Woods (Oxford Centre for Mission Studies). It was established in 1984 and is currently published by SAGE Publications in association with the Oxford Centre for Mission Studies.

== Abstracting and indexing ==
Transformation is abstracted and indexed in:

- Academic Premier
- ATLA Religion Database
- Index theologicus
- Religion & Philosophy Collection
- Theology Digest
