= Africa Theological Journal =

- Discipline: Theology
- Language: English
- Edited by: Angela Olotu, Nehemia Moshi (chair), Jörg Zehelein (Managing Editor)

Publication details
- History: 1968–present
- Publisher: Tumaini University Makumira (Tanzania)
- Frequency: Biannual

Standard abbreviations
- ISO 4: Afr. Theol. J.

Indexing
- ISSN: 2961-6492
- LCCN: 77640516
- OCLC no.: 1776348

Links
- Journal homepage

The Africa Theological Journal is a biannual peer-reviewed academic journal published by Tumaini University Makumira. It was established in 1968 and contains articles of theological interest relevant in Africa. The journal is abstracted and indexed in the ATLA Religion Database.

== See also ==
- List of theological journals
