= Henk Jan de Jonge =

Dutch theologian (1943–2022)

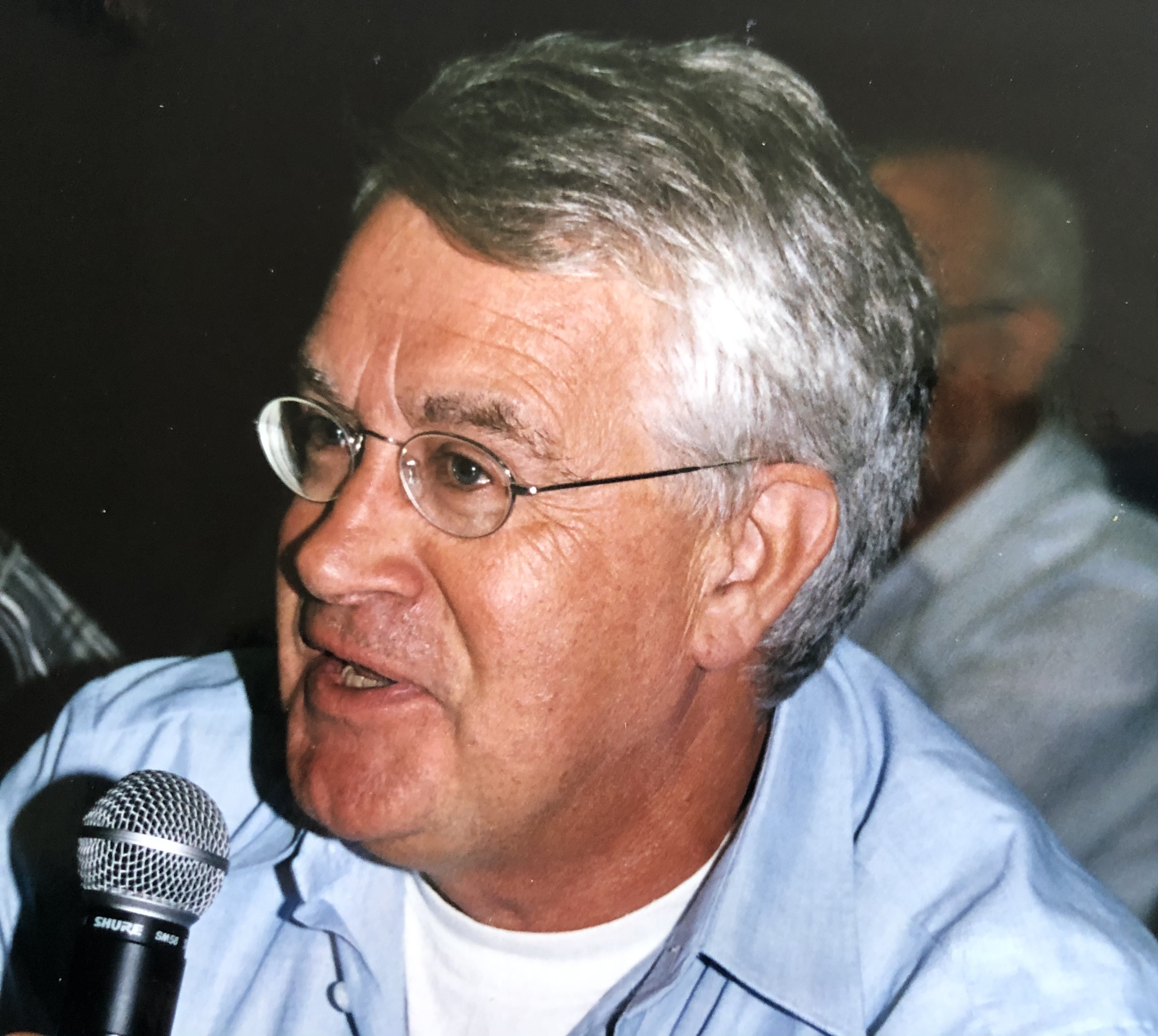
De Jonge in 2004

Henk Jan de Jonge (28 September 1943 – 16 April 2022) was an author and professor emeritus of New Testament at Leiden University. He wrote on the history of early Christian traditions and specialized in the history of New Testament scholarship in the early modern period.

== Academic background ==
De Jonge, born in Leiden on 28 September 1943, read classics and theology at Leiden University (1961–1969). In 1967 he became research assistant in the Department of New Testament and Early Christian Literature of Leiden University, working under Professor Marinus de Jonge (not related) with the task of investigating the textual history of the early Christian Greek apocryphon Testament of the Twelve Patriarchs. He succeeded in establishing the genealogy of all Greek manuscripts and ancient versions of this writing. In 1969 he received an M.A. from Leiden University, majoring in Latin and minoring in Patristic and Byzantine Literature, and New Testament.

== Career ==
In 1970, de Jonge became assistant professor of New Testament at the University of Amsterdam (1970–1984). In 1983 he took his Ph.D. at Leiden with a dissertation on Erasmus’ philological work on the New Testament. He returned to Leiden as assistant professor of New Testament in 1985. From 1987 to 1991 he held an endowed chair for the history of New Testament interpretation. In 1991 he became full Professor of New Testament and Early Christian Literature. He was accorded emeritus status in 2006.

De Jonge served five years as dean of the faculty of theology of Leiden University (1994–1996; 2002–2005) In 2006 he was appointed Knight of the Order of the Netherlands Lion. For the year 2012–2013, he was the President of the Studiorum Novi Testamenti Societas an international society of New Testament scholars.

== Research ==
Topics on which de Jonge focused in his research include the origin of the belief in Jesus’ resurrection, the accounts of Jesus’ ascension, and the earliest history of the eucharist. Another recurrent theme in his research is Erasmus’ edition of the New Testament (1516), which, as de Jonge argued repeatedly, Erasmus meant primarily as an edition of his revision of the Latin Vulgate. The Greek text was added to support and justify the choices Erasmus made in the Latin version.

== Selected editorships ==
- Novum Testamentum (1978–2007)
- Monograph series ‘Supplements to Novum Testamentum’ (1978–2007)
- The series ‘Pseudepigrapha Veteris Testamenti Graece’ (1996–2015)
- Monograph series ‘Studia in Veteris Testamenti Pseudepigrapha’ (1996–2015)
- Member of the editorial committee of the critical edition of Opera omnia Desiderii Erasmi (1977-)
- Co-editor of The Biblical Canons (Bibliotheca Ephemeridum Theologicarum Lovaniensium 163), Leuven 2003
- Supervisory editor of The Correspondence of Joseph Scaliger (ed. P. Botley and D. van Miert), Geneva 2012

== Selected publications ==
- ‘Les origins historiques de l’attente du retour de Jésus’, Études théologiques et religieuses 74 (1999) 491–503
- ‘Visionary Experience and the Historical Origins of Christianity’, in R. Bieringer, et al.. (eds.), Resurrection in the New Testament (Bibliotheca Ephemeridum Theologicarum Lovaniensium 165; Leuven 2002), pp. 35–53
- ‘The Chronology of the Ascension Stories in Luke and Acts’, New Testament Studies 59 (2013) 151–171
- ‘The Origins of the Sunday Eucharist’, Ephemerides Theologicae Lovanienses 92 (2016) 549–579
- ‘Erasmus and the Comma Johanneum’, Ephemerides Theologicae Lovanienses 56 (1980) 381–389
- Erasmi Roterodami Apologia respondens ad ea quae Iacobus Lopis Stunica taxaverat, Amsterdam 1983
- ‘Novum Testamentum a nobis versum: The Essence of Erasmus’ Edition of the New Testament’, The Journal of Theological Studies NS 35 (1984) 394–413
- Erasmi Roterodami Apologia contra Caranzam et quattuor apologiae contra Stunicam, Leiden 2015
