= Religion and American Culture =

- Discipline: Religious studies
- Language: English
- Edited by: Philip Goff, Peter J. Thuesen, Julie Byrne, Thomas J. Davis, Matthew Avery Sutton, Joseph L. Tucker Edmonds, Elaine Peña, Tracy Fessenden, and Laura Levitt

Publication details
- History: 1991-present
- Publisher: Cambridge University Press for the Center for the Study of Religion and American Culture (United States)
- Frequency: Triannually

Standard abbreviations
- ISO 4: Relig. Am. Cult.

Indexing
- ISSN: 1052-1151 (print); 1533-8568 (web)
- LCCN: 91641697
- JSTOR: 10521151
- OCLC no.: 858840764

Links
- Journal homepage

Religion and American Culture is an academic journal published three times per year by Cambridge University Press on behalf of the Center for the Study of Religion and American Culture (Indiana University Indianapolis). The journal was established in 1991 and covers the nature, terms, and dynamics of religion in America, and the interplay between religion and other spheres of American culture. Religion and American Culture is devoted to promoting the ongoing scholarly discussion of the nature, terms, and dynamics of religion in America. Embracing a diversity of methodological approaches and theoretical perspectives, this publication explores the interplay between religion and other spheres of American culture.

== Abstracting and indexing ==
The journal is abstracted and indexed in:

- America: History and Life
- Arts and Humanities Citation Index
- British Humanities Index
- Expanded Academic ASAP
- ProQuest Religion Database, Science of Religion
- Proquest Research Library
- Religious and Theological Abstracts
- Scopus

== See also ==
- List of theological journals
