= JRT =

JRT may refer to:

== Broadcasters ==
- Yugoslav Radio Television (1956–1992)
- Shikoku Broadcasting, Japan (founded 1952)

== Languages ==
- JRT (programming language), a 1980s implementation of Pascal
- Chakato language, spoken in Nigeria (ISO 639-3:krt)

== Other uses ==
- Jack Russell Terrier, a dog breed
- Journal of Reformed Theology (first published 2007)
- JRT (drug), a psychedelic drug
- Junctional reciprocating tachycardia, an abnormal heart condition
