= Peter Thuesen =

Peter Thuesen may refer to:

- Peter J. Thuesen (born 1971), American religious scholar
- Peter Thuesen (sport shooter) (born 1978), Danish sport shooter
