= EJT =

EJT may refer to:

- Eclipse Aviation, defunct American aircraft manufacturer
- Enejit Airport, Marshall Islands
- European Journal of Theology
