= The Person and the Challenges =

- Discipline: Theology, Education, Canon Law, Social Studies
- Language: English, French, German, Italian, Spanish
- Edited by: Józef Stala

Publication details
- History: 2011-present
- Publisher: Pontifical University of John Paul II (Poland)
- Frequency: Biannually
- Open access: www.wt.diecezja.tarnow.pl/index.php/the-person-and-the-challenges

Standard abbreviations
- ISO 4: Pers. Chall.

Indexing
- ISSN: 2083-8018

Links
- Journal homepage

The Person and the Challenges is a biannual peer-reviewed academic journal that was established in 2011. It is published by the Pontifical University of John Paul II in Cracow, Faculty of Theology, Section in Tarnów. The focus of the journal is the international exchange of ideas, evaluations, reports and studies on the person and contemporary challenges and the human dignity in the field of theology, education, canon law and social studies. The founder and former editor-in-chief was Józef Stala. Articles are in German, English, French, Italian and Spanish.

== See also ==
- List of theological journals
