= La scuola cattolica =

La Scuola Cattolica
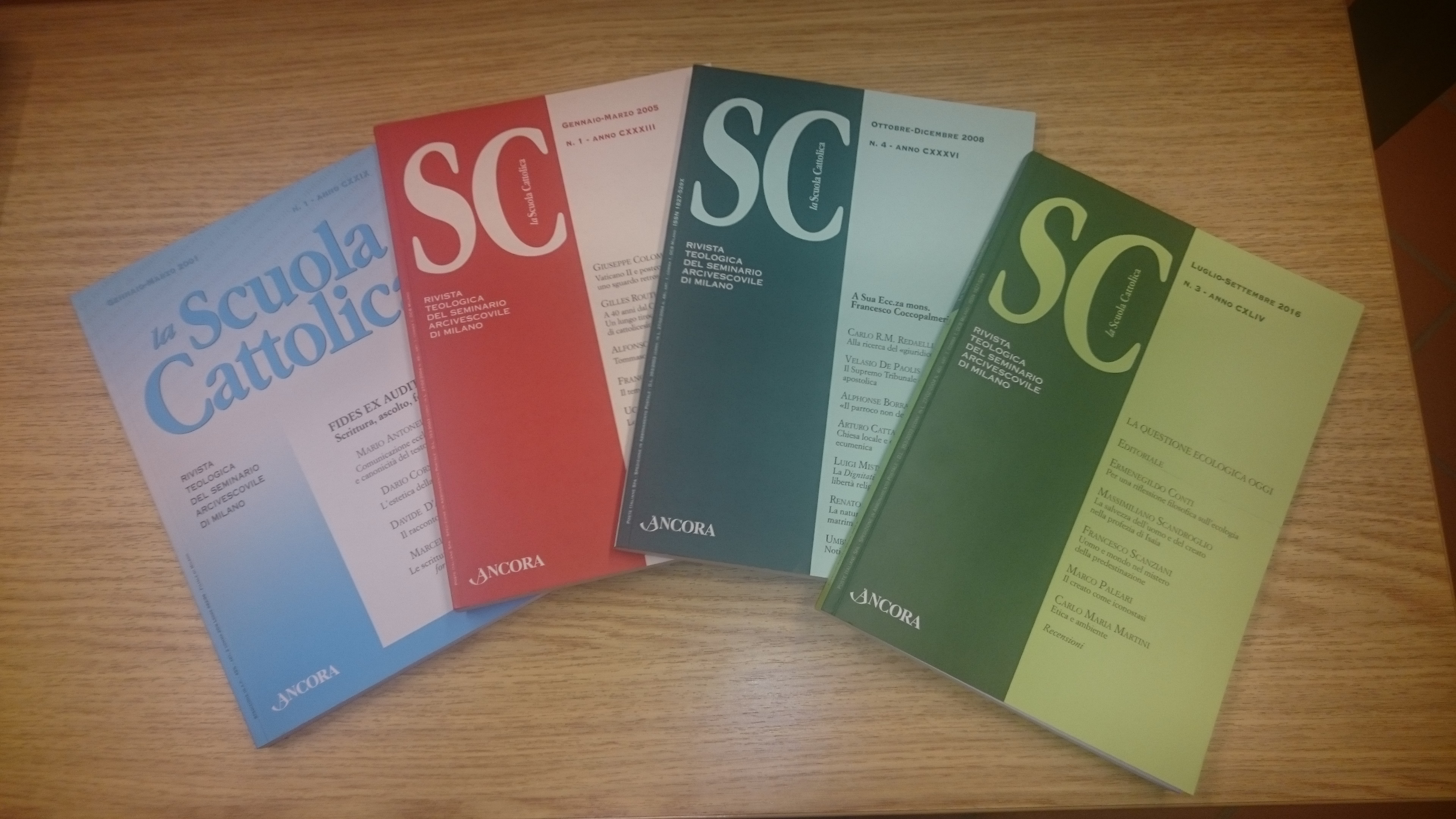
- Discipline: Theology, Holy Scriptures, philosophy
- Language: Italian
- Edited by: Rev. Franco Manzi

Publication details
- History: 1873–present
- Publisher: Àncora Editrice (Italy)
- Frequency: quarterly

Standard abbreviations
- ISO 4: Sc. Cattol.

Indexing
- ISSN: 1827-529X

Links
- Journal homepage

La Scuola Cattolica is a quarterly academic journal of Theology, edited by the Seminary of the Archdiocese of Milan, in Venegono Inferiore (Varese – Italy). It was established in 1873 and still remains in publication today.

The Journal's language is Italian; every article has an abstract in Italian and English.

== Publication history ==
In 1872, some priests from Lombardy decided to create a new monthly apologetical journal, against liberal ideas, in defense of the Pope and the Catholic Church. La Scuola Cattolica was established in 1873 and the first director was mons. Lucido Maria Parocchi. In 1891 the Journal was merged with the La Scienza Italiana of Bologna, so the title became La Scuola Cattolica e la Scienza italiana (a translation could be: The Catholic Teaching and the Italian Science).

In 1901 the Journal's property passed to the new established Pontifical Faculty of Theology of Milan in the Seminary of Milan in Venegono Inferiore (Varese – Italy), and the title switched back to the original La Scuola Cattolica. When in 1967 the Faculty of Theology moved to Milan, the property of the Journal remained to the Seminary of Milan.

Nowadays La Scuola Cattolica is the academic Journal primarily written by teachers and researchers of the Seminary of Milan.

== Issues ==
The journal embraces all areas of theology (dogmatic, fundamental, biblical, moral) as well as other types of religious studies (philosophical, historical, social, and psychological).

== See also ==
- List of theological journals

== Other resources ==
- Media related to La Scuola Cattolica at Wikimedia Commons
