= Journal of Islamic Studies =

Academic journal on religion

- Discipline: Islamic studies
- Language: English

Publication details
- History: 1990–present
- Publisher: Oxford University Press
- Frequency: Triannually

Standard abbreviations
- ISO 4: J. Islam. Stud. (Oxf.)

Indexing
- ISSN: 0955-2340 (print); 1471-6917 (web)

Links
- Journal homepage

The Journal of Islamic Studies is a peer-reviewed academic journal for the field of Islamic studies. The journal was founded in 1992 at the Oxford Centre for Islamic Studies and is published by Oxford University Press. It is indexed by the ATLA Religion Database, the International Bibliography of the Social Sciences, the British Humanities Index, and EBSCO Historical Abstracts. The editor is Farhan Ahmad Nizami of Magdalen College, Oxford. In the first volume, the journal was introduced in an editorial by Nizami as having the goal of:

"...promoting the diffusion and discussion of research findings in several disciplines, to encourage a more informed understanding of various branches of learning which concern themselves with Islam. This comprehensive approach reflects the view that the Islamic tradition is better understood and appreciated within a framework of what French historians might call 'total history'."
