= Baptist Quarterly =

- Discipline: Baptist history
- Language: English
- Edited by: Karen Smith, Simon Woodman

Publication details
- Former name(s): Transactions of the Baptist Historical Society
- History: 1922–present
- Publisher: Taylor & Francis
- Frequency: Quarterly

Standard abbreviations
- ISO 4: Baptist Q.

Indexing
- ISSN: 0005-576X (print); 2056-7731 (web)
- LCCN: 2020204570
- OCLC no.: 741486449

Baptist Quarterly is a quarterly academic journal of Baptist history from the London-based Baptist Historical Society, published by Taylor & Francis. It was established in 1922 as a successor to Transactions of the Baptist Historical Society. Editors-in-chief are Karen Smith of South Wales Baptist College and Cardiff University and Simon Woodman of King's College London. Editors include David W. Bebbington, William H. Brackney, Paul S. Fiddes, Bill J. Leonard, Ian Randall, and others.

== Abstracting and indexing ==
The journal is included in the Atla Religion Database and Scopus.
