= Ephemerides Theologicae Lovanienses =

- Discipline: Theology, canon law
- Language: English, French, German
- Edited by: Johan Leemans

Publication details
- History: 1924-present
- Publisher: Peeters
- Frequency: Quarterly

Standard abbreviations
- ISO 4: Ephemer. Theol. Lovan.

Indexing
- ISSN: 0013-9513 (print); 1783-1423 (web)
- LCCN: 89657494
- OCLC no.: 643750681

Links
- Journal homepage; Online archive

Ephemerides Theologicae Lovanienses is a quarterly peer-reviewed academic journal covering theology and canon law. It was established in 1924 and is published by Peeters. It publishes articles, notes and comments, and reviews in English, French, and German. The journal is abstracted and indexed in the ATLA Religion Database and Scopus. The journal celebrates its centennial in January, 2025 at KU Leuven.

== Supplements ==
The journal irregularly publishes supplements under the title Bibliotheca Ephemeridum Theologicarum Lovaniensium.

== See also ==
- List of theological journals
- https://www.brepolsonline.net/doi/abs/10.1484/J.RHE.5.119140
