= Toronto Journal of Theology =

- Discipline: Theology
- Language: English
- Edited by: Abrahim H. Khan

Publication details
- History: 1985-present
- Publisher: University of Toronto Press (Canada)
- Frequency: Biannual

Standard abbreviations
- ISO 4: Tor. J. Theol.

Indexing
- ISSN: 0826-9831 (print); 1918-6371 (web)
- OCLC no.: 609713454

Links
- Journal homepage; Online access

The Toronto Journal of Theology is a peer-reviewed academic journal of theology published by the University of Toronto Press. Current editor-in-chief is Abrahim H. Khan (University of Toronto). The journal is indexed in Scopus.

== Abstracting and indexing ==
The journal is abstracted and indexed in:

- Religious Index One
- Religious and Theological Abstracts
- New Testament Abstracts
- Old Testament Abstracts
- Canadian Business and Current Affairs Reference
- Canadian Business and Current Affairs Business
- Scopus

== See also ==
- Canadian Journal of Theology (1955-1970)
