= European Journal of Theology =

- Discipline: Theology
- Language: English, French, German
- Edited by: Pieter J. Lalleman

Publication details
- History: 1992-present
- Publisher: Amsterdam University Press on behalf of the Fellowship of European Evangelical Theologians
- Frequency: Biannual

Standard abbreviations
- ISO 4: Eur. J. Theol.

Indexing
- ISSN: 0960-2720
- LCCN: 2010205351
- OCLC no.: 60621802

Links
- Journal homepage

The European Journal of Theology (French: Journal Européen de Théologie, German: Europäische Theologische Zeitschrift) is a biannual peer-reviewed academic journal covering evangelical theology. Contributions are in English, French, or German, with summaries in all three languages. The journal was established in 1992 and is published by Amsterdam University Press on behalf of the Fellowship of European Evangelical Theologians. The editor-in-chief is Pieter J. Lalleman (Spurgeon's College). Previous editors have been Nigel M. de S. Cameron, J. Gordon McConville, Mark W. Elliott, and Jamie Grant.

== Abstracting and indexing ==
The journal is abstracted and indexed in:

- ATLA Religion Database
- ERIH PLUS
- Scopus
