= Studia Theologica =

Studia theologica
- Categories: Theology, Philosophy, Church History
- Frequency: Quarterly
- Publisher: Palacký University of Olomouc
- First issue: 1999
- Country: Czech Republic
- Language: Czech, Slovak
- Website: Studia theologica
- ISSN: 1212-8570

Studia theologica (ISSN 1212-8570, in Czech and Slovak languages with English abstracts) is a peer-reviewed quarterly academic journal of theology, philosophy and church history. Since 1999, it is issued in co-operation of four Czech and Slovak theological colleges: St. Cyril and Methodius Faculty of Theology of Palacký University in Olomouc, Faculty of Theology of University of South Bohemia in České Budějovice, Catholic Theological Faculty of Charles University in Prague and Theological Faculty of University of Trnava in Bratislava.

== See also ==
- List of theological journals
