= Neue Zeitschrift für Systematische Theologie und Religionsphilosophie =

- Discipline: Theology, philosophy
- Language: English

Publication details
- History: 1980–present
- Publisher: Walter de Gruyter
- Frequency: Quarterly

Standard abbreviations
- ISO 4: Neue Z. Syst. Theol. Relig.

Indexing
- ISSN: 1612-9520

Links
- Journal homepage

Neue Zeitschrift für Systematische Theologie und Religionsphilosophie is a peer-reviewed academic journal in theology published by Walter de Gruyter. The journal publishes articles in English and German.

The journal is abstracted in the ATLA - Religion Database, BIBP - Base d'information bibliographique en patristique, BIBL - Biblical Bibliography of Lausanne, Celdes, CNPIEC, Dietrich's Index Philosophicus, EBSCO: Academic Search, Academic Source, Elsevier: Scopus, Gale/Cengage: Academic One File, IBR Internationale Bibliographie der Rezensionen geistes- und sozialwissenschaftlicher Zeitschriftenliteratur, IBZ Internationale Bibliographie der geistes- und sozialwissenschaftlichen Zeitschriftenliteratur, Index Theologicus, INIST, ISI: Arts and Humanities Citation Index, Current Contents, Minerva, ProQuest: Arts & Humanities, Religious and Theological Abstracts and Xolopo.
