= Svensk exegetisk årsbok =

Svensk exegetisk årsbok (Swedish Exegetical Yearbook) is an annual peer-reviewed academic journal of biblical studies and book reviews in Swedish and English. It was established in 1936 by the Swedish Exegetical Society and is distributed internationally by Eisenbrauns. The editor-in-chief is Göran Eidevall (Uppsala university).

== See also ==
- List of theological journals
- Open access in Sweden
