= Evangelical Review of Society and Politics =

- Discipline: Theology
- Language: English
- Edited by: Calvin L. Smith; Stephen Vantassel

Publication details
- History: 2006–2012
- Publisher: Midlands Bible College (United Kingdom)
- Frequency: Biannually

Standard abbreviations
- ISO 4: Evang. Rev. Soc. Politics

Indexing
- ISSN: 1750-2217 (print); 1750-2225 (web)

Links
- Journal homepage

The Evangelical Review of Society and Politics was a peer-reviewed, scholarly theological journal published by the King's Evangelical Divinity School, England. It was published biannually in both print and electronic formats. The journal defined its scope as "scholarly evangelical analysis of contemporary social and political issues".

It has subsequently been replaced by a similar journal in electronic form only Evangelical Review of Theology and Politics and published by the same source.
