= Spiritus (journal) =

- Discipline: Religious studies
- Language: English
- Edited by: Steven Chase

Publication details
- Former name(s): Christian Spirituality Bulletin
- History: 1993-present
- Publisher: Johns Hopkins University Press
- Frequency: Biannually

Standard abbreviations
- ISO 4: Spiritus

Indexing
- ISSN: 1533-1709 (print); 1535-3117 (web)
- OCLC no.: 45664645
- Christian Spirituality Bulletin
- ISSN: 1082-9008

Links
- Journal homepage; Online access

Spiritus: A Journal of Christian Spirituality is a biannual peer-reviewed academic journal published by Johns Hopkins University Press. It was established in 1993 as the Christian Spirituality Bulletin: Journal of the Society for the Study of Christian Spirituality and obtained its current title in 2001. It is the official publication of the Society for the Study of Christian Spirituality. The journal includes original articles, reviews, and translations. Readership includes academics as well as a general audience. The editor-in-chief is Glen G. Scorgie (Bethel University).

== Abstracting and indexing ==
The journal is abstracted and indexed in the Christian Periodical Index, Dietrich's Index Philosophicus, International Bibliography of Book Reviews of Scholarly Literature in the Humanities and Social Sciences, International Bibliography of Periodical Literature, and UDL-Edge Citation Index Database.

== See also ==
- List of theology journals
