= Currents in Theology and Mission =

- Discipline: Religious studies
- Language: English
- Edited by: Kathleen D. Billman; Craig Nessan

Publication details
- History: 1974-present
- Publisher: Lutheran School of Theology at Chicago, Wartburg Theological Seminary
- Frequency: Quarterly

Standard abbreviations
- ISO 4: Curr. Theol. Mission

Indexing
- ISSN: 0098-2113
- LCCN: 97647468
- OCLC no.: 310845187

Links
- Journal homepage; Online access; Online archive

Currents in Theology and Mission is a quarterly peer-reviewed open access academic journal of theology published by the Lutheran School of Theology at Chicago and Wartburg Theological Seminary. The editors-in-chief are Kathleen D. Billman and Craig Nessan. The journal was established in 1974 as a publication of Seminex, as a continuation of the defunct Concordia Theological Monthly.

== Abstracting and indexing ==
The journal is abstracted and indexed in the ATLA Religion Database.
