= Theology Digest =

- Language: English

Publication details
- History: 1953–2010
- Publisher: Saint Louis University (United States)
- Frequency: Bimonthly

Standard abbreviations
- ISO 4: Theol. Dig.

Indexing
- ISSN: 0040-5728
- LCCN: 60017035
- OCLC no.: 1642682

Theology Digest (1953–2010) summarized selected recent articles from over 400 theological journals. Some were in the form of formal summaries, approved by the authors of the articles, while some were briefer abstracts for whose accuracy the editors assumed responsibility.

The digest was published quarterly. In each year, three issues contained the abstracts and summaries, and the fourth contained selected lectures from the series of Bellarmine Lectures and elsewhere. All issues contained a book survey as well, covering over 200 books per issue.

The Digest was founded by Cyril A. Vollert, S.J., and Gerald F. Van Ackeren, S.J., at the Jesuit divinity school, St. Mary's College in Kansas in 1953, but those of other denominations became involved as well.

Theology Digest was based at Saint Louis University from 1967 until 2010.

== See also ==
- List of theological journals
