= Restoration Quarterly =

- Discipline: Theology, Church history, Biblical studies
- Language: English
- Edited by: Richard Wright

Publication details
- History: 1957 to present
- Publisher: The Restoration Quarterly Corporation (United States)
- Frequency: Quarterly

Standard abbreviations
- ISO 4: Restor. Q.

Indexing
- ISSN: 0486-5642
- OCLC no.: 226370454

Links
- Journal homepage

Restoration Quarterly is a scholarly journal associated with the Churches of Christ. It focuses on issues of interest to the Churches of Christ and other groups associated with the Restoration Movement more generally.

== History ==
The journal was established in 1957 by Abraham J. Malherbe and Pat E. Harrell. It gained recognition outside the Churches of Christ under the leadership of Thomas H. Olbricht, who was editor from 1973 through 1987. From 1993 to 2024, it was edited by James W. Thompson. Since 2025, Richard Wright, ACU professor of New Testament, has been the editor of RQ. The journal is informally associated with Abilene Christian University through shared staff and other assistance offered by the university. There are no formal organizational or financial ties between the two, however.

== Contents ==
The Quarterly has "reflected a maturing of theological scholarship especially in Churches of Christ." It has also published articles from other branches of the Restoration Movement and from outside the movement. Most of the articles have focused on biblical studies and the history of the Restoration Movement.
