= Biblical Theology Bulletin =

Quarterly academic journal

- Discipline: Biblical studies
- Language: English
- Edited by: David Bossman

Publication details
- History: 1973–present
- Publisher: SAGE Publications on behalf of Biblical Theology Bulletin Inc.
- Frequency: Quarterly

Standard abbreviations
- ISO 4: Biblic. Theol. Bull.

Indexing
- ISSN: 0146-1079 (print); 1945-7596 (web)
- LCCN: 72626645
- OCLC no.: 1774838

Links
- Journal homepage; Online access; Online archive

The Biblical Theology Bulletin is a quarterly peer-reviewed academic journal that publishes articles and book reviews in the fields of biblical studies and, to a lesser extent, theology. The journal was established in 1971 under the editorship of Leopold Sabourin (Pontifical Biblical Institute). According to Michael Gorman, the journal is "devoted primarily to social-scientific perspectives."

== Abstracting and indexing ==
The journal is abstracted and indexed in:

- Academic Onefile
- Academic Complete
- Scopus
- ZETOC
