= Peter J. Thuesen =

Peter Johannes Thuesen (born 1971) is Professor of Religious Studies at Indiana University – Purdue University Indianapolis.

Thuesen studied at the University of North Carolina at Chapel Hill and Princeton University. He taught at Yale Divinity School and Tufts University before coming to IUPUI.

Thuesen has written two works of intellectual history: In Discordance with the Scriptures: American Protestant Battles over Translating the Bible (1999) and Predestination: The American Career of a Contentious Doctrine (2009). Predestination received the 2010 Christianity Today Book Award for History/Biography. He is also co-editor of Religion and American Culture.
