= Concordia Theological Quarterly =

- Discipline: Theology
- Language: English
- Edited by: David P. Scaer

Publication details
- Former name: The Springfielder
- Publisher: Lutheran Church–Missouri Synod
- Frequency: Quarterly

Standard abbreviations
- ISO 4: Concordia Theol. Q.

Indexing
- ISSN: 0038-8610
- OCLC no.: 21218465

Links
- Journal homepage

Concordia Theological Quarterly is a peer-reviewed academic journal of theology published for the Lutheran Church–Missouri Synod by the faculty of Concordia Theological Seminary in Fort Wayne, Indiana. It continues The Springfielder and is published in January, April, July, and October each year. The journal is abstracted and indexed by the ATLA Religion Database, Religion Index One: Periodicals, International Bibliography of Periodical Literature on the Humanities and Social Sciences, Old Testament Abstracts, and New Testament Abstracts.

The editor-in-chief is David P. Scaer, professor of Systematic Theology and New Testament and professor of Biblical and Systematic Theology at Concordia Theological Seminary.
