= Beit Mikra =

- Discipline: Hebrew Bible
- Language: Hebrew

Publication details
- History: 1956-present
- Publisher: World Jewish Bible Center (Israel)
- Frequency: Quarterly

Standard abbreviations
- ISO 4: Beit Mikra

Indexing
- ISSN: 0005-979X
- LCCN: a62001461
- OCLC no.: 717051676

Beit Mikra: Journal for the Study of the Bible and Its World, also known as Bet Mikra and Beth Mikra (Hebrew: בית מקרא), is a Hebrew language journal about the Hebrew Bible. It is published by the World Jewish Bible Center.

Beit Mikra was founded by Ben Zion Luria as the Hebrew-language publication of the Israel Society for Biblical Research, which later became the Israeli branch of the World Jewish Bible Society. (The Jewish Bible Quarterly was later established as the World Jewish Bible Society's English-language journal.) After a reorganization in 1989, the Israel Society for Biblical Research was reduced to publishing Beit Mikra "on a miserly (and often delayed) grant from the Ministry of Education."
