= Canadian Journal of Theology =

- Discipline: Christianity studies
- Language: English

Publication details
- History: 1955–1970
- Publisher: University of Toronto Press
- Frequency: Quarterly

Standard abbreviations
- ISO 4: Can. J. Theol.

Links
- Journal homepage

The Canadian Journal of Theology was a quarterly academic journal of theology published by the University of Toronto Press that appeared from 1955 to 1970.

== See also ==
- Studies in Religion
- Toronto Journal of Theology
