= Studia Evangelica =

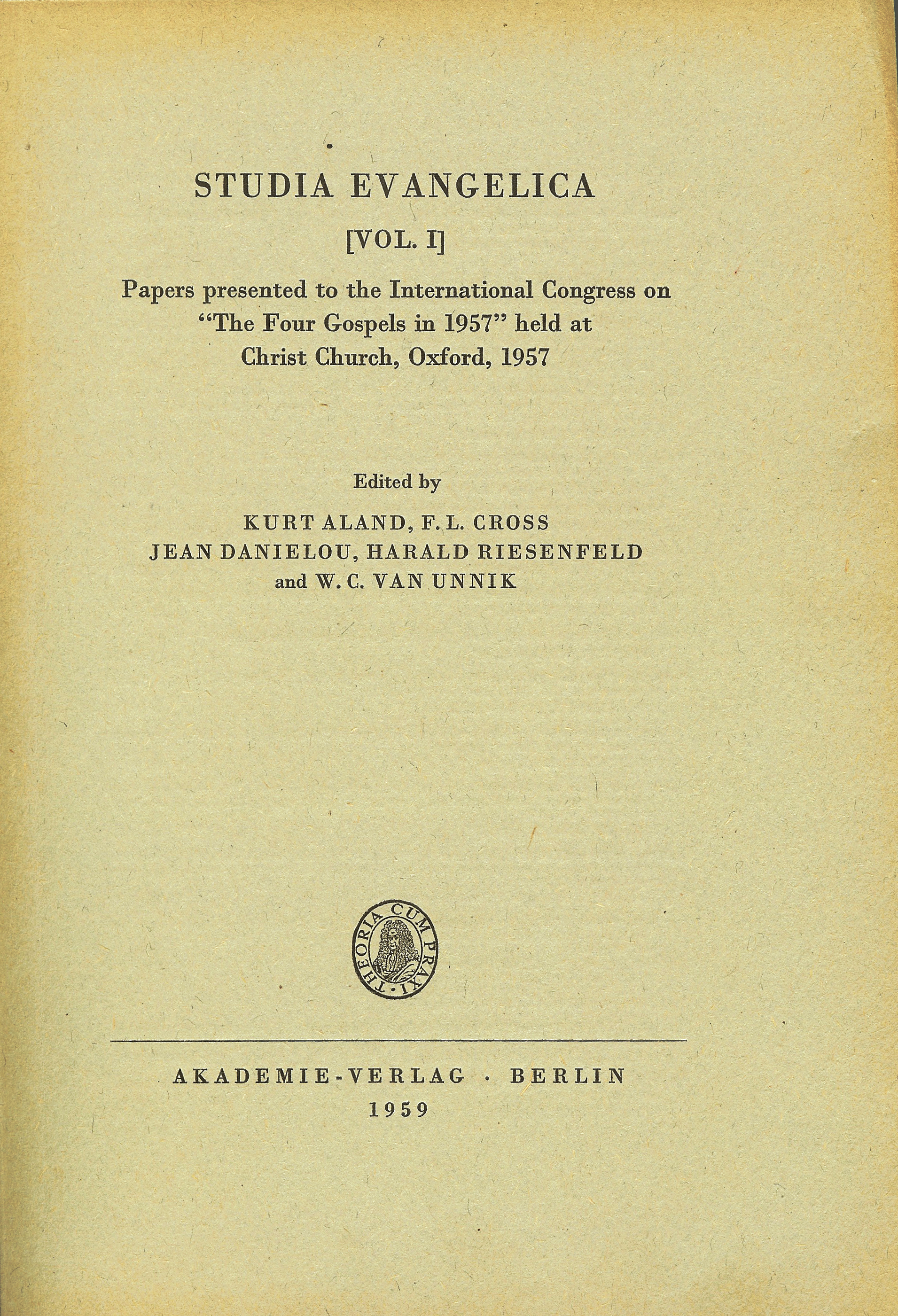
The cover of the first volume

Studia evangelica is a book containing a series of papers presented to the International Congress held at Christ Church (University of Oxford), Oxford, 1957. The Congress followed immediately on the annual gathering of the Studiorum Novi Testamenti Societas which had met at Birmingham. The full title is: Studia evangelica: papers presented to the International Congress on "The Four Gospels in 1957" held at Christ Church, Oxford, 1957. This was followed by six more volumes containing papers presented at subsequent congresses. the last being published in 1982. All were in the series "Texte und Untersuchungen zur Geschichte der altchristlichen Literatur"; Bd. 73, 87, 88, 102, 103, 112 & 126.

The first volume was published by Akademie-Verlag, Berlin, in 1959. It was edited by Kurt Aland, F. L. Cross, Jean Daniélou, Harald Riesenfeld and W. C. Van Unnik.
