= Journal of Moral Theology =

- Discipline: Roman Catholic moral theology
- Language: English
- Edited by: M. Therese Lysaught (Editor ); Jason King (Editor Emeritus)

Publication details
- History: 2012 – present
- Publisher: Journal of Moral Theology, Inc. (United States)
- Frequency: Semi-annual (January, July)

Standard abbreviations
- ISO 4: J. Moral Theol.

Indexing
- ISSN: 2166-2851 (print); 2166-2118 (web)

Links
- Journal homepage

The Journal of Moral Theology is an academic journal that publishes peer-reviewed scholarly articles in the field of Roman Catholic moral theology. The open-access journal is published semi-annually, with regular issues in January and July that cover theological treatments of related topics in philosophy, economics, political philosophy, and psychology. Special issues are also regularly published in April and October. Articles published in the journal undergo at least two double-blind peer reviews before being selected for publication.

== History ==
The journal was established by David Matzko McCarthy of Mount St. Mary's University, then the Fr. James M. Forker Professor of Catholic Social Teaching. He received considerable assistance from Joshua Hochschild, who was the Mount’s Dean of the College of Liberal Arts at that time, and from David Cloutier and William Mattison III, who edited the inaugural issue (January 2012). McCarthy’s work on the journal started in early in 2009, and by the end of the year, an intrepid editorial board was formed.

The initial board membership was constituted by Melanie Barrett, Joseph Capizzi, David Cloutier, Kelly Johnson, M. Therese Lysaught, Bryan Massingale, William C. Mattison III, Jeanne Heffernan Schindler, and Christopher P. Vogt. The current editorial board can be found here.

In 2016, Jason King took on the role of associate editor, and in 2017, he became the editor. In 2019, M. Therese Lysaught joined the editorial staff as associate editor, and then moved into the editor role in 2022. Dr. Lysaught is a professor in the Stritch School of Medicine at Loyola University Chicago.

In 2022, the journal was incorporated as an independent not-for-profit publisher.

== Current Operations ==
In 2021, the journal launched the collaborative "Global Theological Ethics" book series with Catholic Theological Ethics in the World Church, published online and in print with the JMT's long-time hard-copy partner Wipf and Stock. Open-access versions of published titles can be found here.

In 2022, the editorial staff was reorganized and expanded to encompass a senior editor, managing editor, four associate editors, and an editorial assistant, in addition to the long-standing roles of editor and editor emeritus. The current editorial staff can be found here here.

In 2023, the journal launched the collaborative "Theological Investigations of Artificial Intelligence" book series with the AI Research Group of the Centre for Digital Inquiry of the Holy See's Dicastery for Culture and Education. These books are also published online and in print with the JMT's long-time hard-copy partner Wipf and Stock. Open-access versions of published titles can be found here.

The Journal of Moral Theology is available full text in the ATLA Religion Database with ATLASerials® (RDB®), a product of the American Theological Library Association, and also on the EBSCO database. It is additionally indexed in:

- Academic Search Premier (EBSCO Publishing)
- Academic Search Complete (EBSCO Publishing)
- Academic Search Elite (EBSCO Publishing)
- Academic Search Ultimate (EBSCO Publishing)
- ANVUR
- Cabells
- DOAJ
- Humanities Ultimate (EBSCO Publishing)
- Open Access Digital Library
- ProQuest
- SCOPUS
- Ullrichsweb
