= Journal of Greco-Roman Christianity and Judaism =

- Discipline: Religious studies
- Language: English
- Edited by: Stanley E. Porter

Publication details
- History: 2000-present
- Publisher: McMaster Divinity College
- Frequency: Annually

Standard abbreviations
- ISO 4: J. Greco-Roman Christ. Jud.

Indexing
- ISSN: 1467-1085 (print); 1467-1093 (web)
- OCLC no.: 58430439

Links
- Journal homepage

The Journal of Greco-Roman Christianity and Judaism is a peer-reviewed academic journal published by McMaster Divinity College. The editor-in-chief is Stanley E. Porter (McMaster Divinity College). Articles are published open access, until a volume is finished, after which they are available only in print. The journal is abstracted and indexed in the ATLA Religion Database.
