= Józef Stala =

Polish Catholic priest and philosopher (1966–2025)

Józef Stala (6 December 1966 – 6 February 2025) was a Polish Catholic priest, theologian and philosopher. He was ordained on 25 May 1991.

== Biography ==
Stala was born on 6 December 1966. From 1985 until 1991 Stala studied philosophy and theology, 1985 and 1986 at the seminary Gościkowo-Paradyż and from 1986 to 1991 in Tarnów. On 31 May 1991, he finished his studies with Magister of Theology at the Pontifical academy in Kraków (now: Pontifical University of John Paul II). After studies at the Warsaw Theological Academy (now: Cardinal Stefan Wyszyński University in Warsaw) he earned on 15 May 1995 the Licentiate, on 8 June 1998 the Doctorate and in 2005 the Habilitation with his book: Katecheza o małżeństwie i rodzinie w Polsce po Soborze Watykańskim II. ("Religious education in the Families in Poland after the Second Vatican Council") at the Pontifical University of John Paul II.

Stala was a priest of Tarnów diocese, Associate Professor of Catechetics and Vice Dean for Research, Development and Cooperation and the Head of the Research Section of Pedagogical and Catechetical Studies at the Pontifical University of John Paul II in Cracow (UPJPII), Theology Faculty, Section in Tarnów (WTST). He was also co-ordinator of Erasmus Programme at the WTST and editor in chief of the international scientific journal The Person and the Challenges.

Stala was elected into the academic senate to become prorector of science and international cooperation of the Pontifical University in Cracow for the period from 2014 until 2020.

Stala died on 6 February 2025, at the age of 58.

== Books ==
- E. Osewska, J. Stala: Die katholische Schule zu Beginn des XXI. Jahrhunderts am Beispiel Polens und Englands UKSW, Warszawa 2015, ISBN 978-83-65224-83-5 (print), ISBN 978-83-65224-84-2 (online)
- J. Stala, E. Osewska. Anders erziehen in Polen. Der Erziehungs- und Bildungsbegriff im Kontext eines sich ständig verändernden Europas des XXI. Jahrhunderts. Polihymnia, Tarnów 2009, ISBN 978-83-7270-765-9.
- J. Stala. Familienkatechese in Polen um die Jahrhundertwende. Probleme und Herausforderungen. Biblos, Tarnów 2008, ISBN 978-83-7332-674-3.
- J. Stala. Dzisiejsza młodzież powiedziała, że... : problemy i wyzwania, Kielce 2006, wyd. Jedność, ISBN 8374423552.
- J. Stala. Katecheza o małżeństwie i rodzinie w Polsce po Soborze Watykańskim II : próba oceny, Wydawnictwo Diecezji Tarnowskiej Biblos. Tarnów : "Biblos", cop. 2004. ISBN 8373322248
- J. Stala. Katecheza rodzinna w nauczaniu Kościoła od Soboru Watykańskiego II, Tarnów; Lublin : Wydawnictwo Polihymnia, 2009. ISBN 9788372707703
- J. Stala, Weronika Dryl. Kocham Cię, Jezu : propozycje katechez przedszkolnych dla pięciolatków Tarnów : "Biblos", 2001. ISBN 8373320032
- J. Stala, Anna Kawa. Miłuję Chrystusa : pomoce do katechez i homilii : ewangelie roku B Kraków : Wydaw. Księży Sercanów, cop. 2002. ISBN 8388465686
- J. Stala, Anna Kawa. Naśladuję Chrystusa : pomoce do katechez i homilii - Ewangelie roku C Kraków : Wydaw. Księży Sercanów, 2003. ISBN 838846597X
- J. Stala, Anna Kawa. Poznaję Chrystusa : pomoce do katechez i homilii - Ewangelie roku A Kraków : "SCJ", 2001. ISBN 8388465368
- J. Stala. Ręce mego ojca i usta mojej matki powiedziały mi najwięcej o Bogu : biskupa Piotra Bednarczyka ujęcie katechezy rodzinnej Tarnów; Lublin : Wydawnictwo Polihymnia, 2011. ISBN 9788372709523
- J. Stala. W kierunku integralnej edukacji religijnej w rodzinie : (próba refleksji nad nauczaniem Jana Pawła II w kontekście polskich uwarunkowań) Tarnów; Lublin : Wydawnictwo Polihymnia, 2010. ISBN 9788372708014
- J. Stala. Z Ewangelią w trzecie tysiąclecie : Piesza Pielgrzymka Tarnowska, Tarnów - 2001 Tarnów : "Biblos", cop. 2001. ISBN 8387952664
- J. Stala, Anna Kawa. Z Jezusem szczęśliwi codziennie : Ewangelie dni powszednich. T. 2, Wielki Post i Wielkanoc Kraków : Dom Wydawniczy "Rafael", cop. 2004. ISBN 8389431351
- J. Stala, Anna Kawa. Z Jezusem szczęśliwi codziennie : Ewangelie dni powszednich. T. 4, Wielki Post i Wielkanoc Kraków : Dom Wydawniczy "Rafael", cop. 2004. ISBN 8389431564
- J. Stala, Anna Kawa. Z Jezusem szczęśliwi codziennie : Ewangelie dni powszednich. T. 5, Wielki Post i Wielkanoc Kraków : Dom Wydawniczy "Rafael", cop. 2004. ISBN 8389431599

== Articles in English ==
- J. Stala. Discovering God with Children the Help of R.E. Books in a Polish Context. in Symmetrical communication? Philosophy and Theology in Classrooms across Europe, red. F. Kraft, H. Roose, G. Büttner, Rehburg-Loccum 2011, p. 49–59.
- E. Osewska, J. Stala. Ethical need for authentic fraternity rooted in the Bible. in Biblia a etika: etické dimenzie správania, red. D. Hanesová, Banská Bystrica 2011, wyd. Pedagogická fakulta Univerzity Mateja Bela w Banská Bystrica, p. 134–139.
- J. Stala. Religious Education / Catechesis in the Family: A Basic Psychological and Church Perspective. in Religious Education / Catechesis in the Family. A European Perspective, red. E. Osewska, J. Stala, Warszawa 2010, wyd. UKSW, p. 49–57.
- J. Stala, E. Osewska. Sociological Aspects of Family Religious Education in Poland. in Religious Education / Catechesis in the Family. A European Perspective, red. E. Osewska, J. Stala, Warszawa 2010, wyd. UKSW, p. 167–177.
- E. Osewska, J. Stala: Religious Education / Catechesis in the Family. A European Perspective. UKSW, Warszawa 2010.

== Lectures of J. Stala in English ==
- Charles University in Prague / Univerzita Karlova v Praze, Katolická teologická fakulta, Katedra pastorálních oborů, Praga, 12 September 2012, international scientific conference The Powerful Learning Environments: Religious Education in the post-modern reality and Modern Family Catechesis
- Faculty of Pedagogics Univerzity Mateja Bela w Banská Bystrica, 1 March 2011, International Conference: Bible and Ethics: Ethical Dimensions of Behaviour: Ethical need for authentic fraternity rooted in the Bible
- The Catholic University in Ružomberok/Katolícka Univerzita v Rużomberku, 28 February 2011: Models of modern education
- Charles University in Prague/ Univerzita Karlova v Praze, 10 April 2010: How do we find God with the help of Religious education books?
- Charles University in Prague/ Univerzita Karlova v Praze, 8 April 2010: Modern Christian Formation
- Univerza v Ljubljani / University of Ljubljana, 25 March 2010: Selected Problems of Modern Youth: with Special Emphasis on Group Formation
- Univerza v Ljubljani / University of Ljubljana, 25 March 2010, International Conference: Religious Education and Catechesis in Europe with a Special Focus on Poland, England and Slovenia: Religious Education and Catechesis in Poland
- The Catholic University in Ružomberok/Katolícka Univerzita v Rużomberku, 23 March 2010: Accompany the youth in the process of their formation
- The Catholic University in Ružomberok/Katolícka Univerzita v Rużomberku, 22 March 2010: Models of modern education
- Rehburg - Loccum (around Hannover), German, 6–9 September 2009, International Conference: Theologising with Children: How do we find God with children with the help of Religious education programme?

== Articles in German ==
- J. Stala. Der Mensch als Person: Die bestimmende Grundlage für Johannes Paul II. in seinem Bild von der Familie in „The Person and the Challenges” 2 (2012) No. 2, p. 41–59.
- J. Stala. Die Transzendenz als bestimmendes Merkmal der Person in der Anthropologie und der Pädagogik Johannes Pauls II. in „The Person and the Challenges” 2 (2012) No. 1, p. 61–75.
- J. Stala. Die personalistische Grundlage für Erziehung und Bildung in der katholischen Schule in „Angelicum“ 88 (2011), p. 997–1007.
- J. Stala. Ausgewählte Aspekte von Erziehung und Bildung an der katholischen Schule in „Angelicum“ 88 (2011), p. 751–761.
- J. Stala. Impulse Johannes Pauls II. zur Religionserziehung in der Familie in „Studia Bobolanum“ 4 (2011), p. 153–163.
- J. Stala. Die Religionserziehung in der Familie im Kontext der Gegebenheiten in Polen in „Biuletyn Edukacji Medialnej” (2011) No. 1, p. 173–183.
- J. Stala. Wie schön ist es, in der Reichweite des Wortes Gottes und der Eucharistie zu leben. Eine Betrachtung zur eucharistischen Bildung der jungen Menschen in „Theologica” 46 (2011) 2, p. 311–322.
- J. Stala. Internet - Church - Communication in „Studia Pastoralne” (2011) No. 7, p. 566–574.
- J. Stala. Aspekte der Aktivitäten der akademischen Mitarbeiter an der Theologischen Fakultät, Sektion Tarnów, im Dienst der Wissenschaft. in „The Person and the Challenges” 1 (2011) No. 2, p. 11–19.
- J. Stala. Die Person und die Herausforderungen der Gegenwart im Licht der Nachfolge und der Lehre des Heiligen Vaters Johannes Pauls II „The Person and the Challenges“ - ein internationales wissenschaftliches Periodikum. in „The Person and the Challenges” 1 (2011) No. 1, p. 13–23.
- J. Stala. Grundlagen der Religionserziehung in der Familie im Kontext zu den Gegebenheiten der heutigen Zeit. „Studia Teologiczno-Historyczne Śląska Opolskiego“ (2010) No. 30, p. 263–272.
- J. Stala. Pädagogisch-katechetische Implikationen aus den Anregungen Johannes Pauls II. für die sakramentale Bildung. Zehn Jahre Gymnasialreform in Polen. „Studia Bobolanum” (2010) No. 4, p. 155–167.
- J. Stala. Lehrpläne und Schulbücher für den Religionsunterricht an den Staatlichen Grundschulen in Polen. „Bogoslovni vestnik“ 70 (2010) No. 3, p. 405–414.
- J. Stala. Lasst uns voller Hoffnung vorwärts gehen. Pädagogisch-katechetische Aspekte, wie der Christ die Zeichen der Zeit in der gegenwärtigen Welt aufnimmt. „Roczniki liturgiczne“ 1 (56) (2009), p. 435–447.
