= Scottish Bulletin of Evangelical Theology =

- Language: English
- Edited by: David Reimer

Publication details
- History: 1983-present
- Publisher: Scottish Evangelical Theology Society; Highland Theological College
- Frequency: Biannually

Standard abbreviations
- ISO 4: Scott. Bull. Evang. Theol.

Indexing
- ISSN: 0265-4539
- OCLC no.: 12603222

The Scottish Bulletin of Evangelical Theology is an academic journal published by the Scottish Evangelical Theology Society in association with Highland Theological College. It was established in 1983, and is published twice a year. The current editor is Rev Dr John C A Ferguson.
