= Jewish Bible Quarterly =

- Discipline: Hebrew Bible
- Language: English
- Edited by: Zvi Ron

Publication details
- Former name: Dor le Dor
- History: 1972-present
- Publisher: Jewish Bible Association (Israel)
- Frequency: Quarterly

Standard abbreviations
- ISO 4: Jew. Bible Q.

Indexing
- ISSN: 0792-3910
- OCLC no.: 21320204

Links
- Journal homepage

The Jewish Bible Quarterly (JBQ) is a journal about the Hebrew Bible. It is published by the Jewish Bible Association. The editor is Rabbi Dr. Zvi Ron as of March 2011.

JBQ was established in 1972 as Dor le Dor. It was published by the World Jewish Bible Society and edited by Louis Katzoff. It was established as the English-language publication of the society, whereas Beit Mikra was the Hebrew-language publication covering the same subject area. Shimon Bakon was the editor from 1987 until 2011 and served as editor emeritus until his death in February 2019 at the age of 103.

The journal received its present name in 1989, and the following year the World Jewish Bible Society became the Jewish Bible Association.
