= The Journal of Welsh Religious History =

- Discipline: History of Religion
- Language: English

Publication details
- History: 1984–2005
- Publisher: University of Wales Press
- Frequency: Annually

Standard abbreviations
- ISO 4: J. Welsh Relig. Hist.

Indexing
- ISSN: 0967-3938
- OCLC no.: 29788206

The Journal of Welsh Religious History is published by the University of Wales Press on behalf of the Centre for the Advanced Study of Religion in Wales (Bangor University) and previously the Welsh Religious History Society. It is an English-language academic journal containing articles, reviews, and news relating to the history of Christianity in Wales. It was originally established in 1984 under the title Journal of Welsh Ecclesiastical History. Since it obtained its current title in 1992, two series were published: First series, Vols. 1 (1993) to 8 (2000); new series Vol. 1 (2001) to Vol. 5 (2005).

In 2015, the University of Wales Press announced a successor journal: the Journal of Religious History, Literature and Culture.

The journal has been digitized by the Welsh Journals Online project at the National Library of Wales.
