= Journal of Reformed Theology =

- Language: English
- Edited by: E. A. J. G. Van der Borght

Publication details
- History: 2007-present
- Publisher: Brill
- Frequency: Quarterly

Standard abbreviations
- ISO 4: J. Reform. Theol.

Indexing
- ISSN: 1872-5163

Links
- Journal homepage

The Journal of Reformed Theology (JRT) is a quarterly peer-reviewed academic journal published by Brill on behalf of the International Reformed Theological Institute. The Journal provides a tool for discussion on classical and contemporary theological issues.
