= Fellowship of European Evangelical Theologians =

European association of theologians

Fellowship of European Evangelical Theologians (FEET) is a European association of evangelical theologians, churches, scholars and fellowships. It was founded by John R. W. Stott in 1974 in the wake of the Lausanne Conference.

The goal is to connect academic evangelical theologians (and churches could also be members) on the basis of scriptural authority and biblical theology.

FEET holds yearly conferences, either virtual or in person, on specific topics that are relevant to evangelicals. Due to COVID in 2020, FEET held its first virtual conference, which has continued yearly beside the biannual in person conference at different locations in Europe.

The official Journal of FEET is the European Journal of Theology, holding articles in English, German and French.
