= American Theological Library Association =

Professional library association and academic publisher

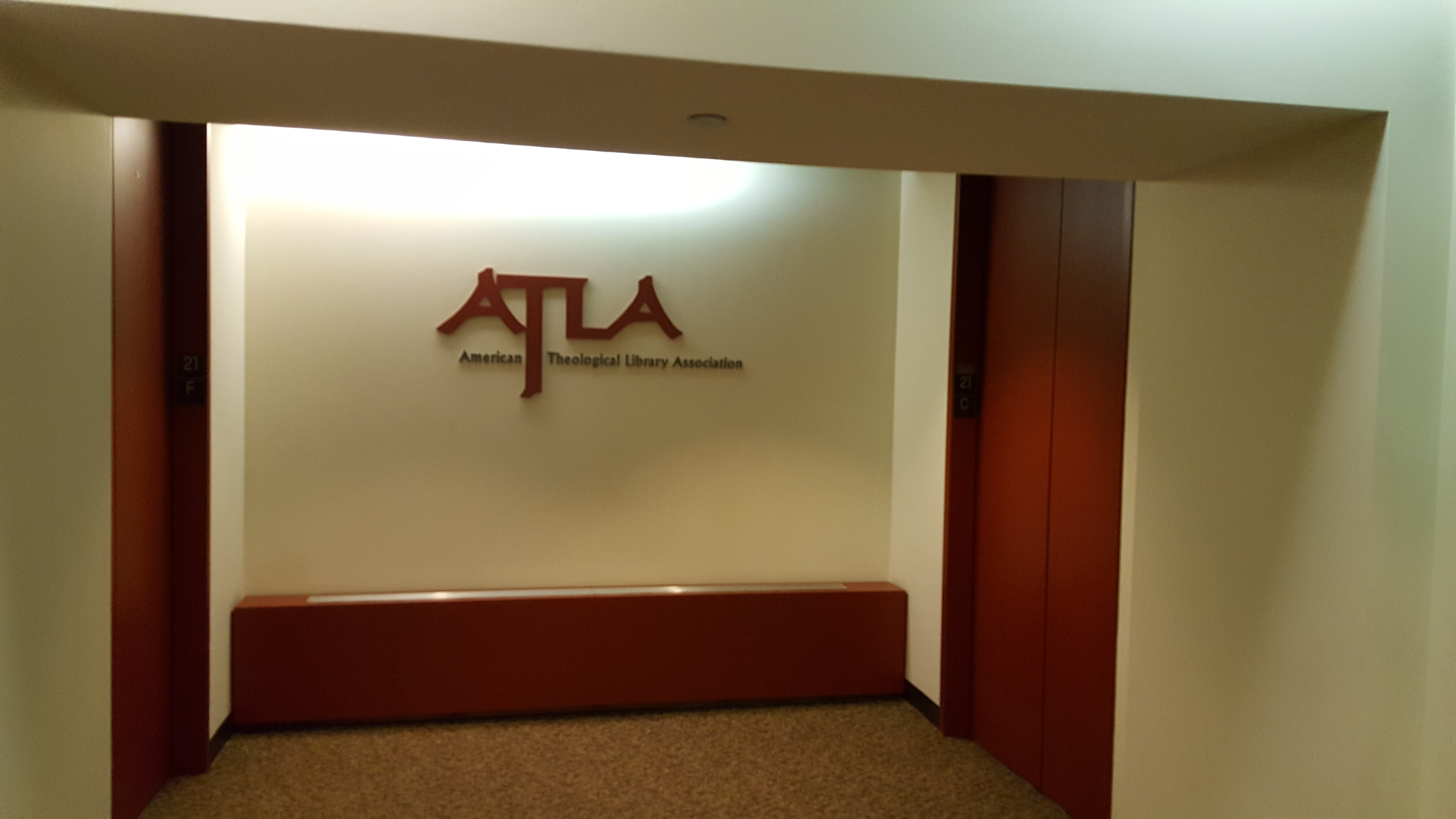
Atla (American Theological Library Association)

Atla (formerly the American Theological Library Association) is a nonprofit, 501(c)(3), professional association, headquartered in Chicago, Illinois, United States. Atla's member libraries and librarians provide resources for scholarly research to tens of thousands of students, faculty, staff, and administrators. The association supports the membership with services and products, including an annual conference, members-only publications and discounts, and professional development opportunities.

== Mission ==
The mission of Atla is to foster the study of theology and religion by enhancing the development of theological and religious studies libraries and librarianship. Established in 1946, Atla is governed by an elected board of directors and has over 800 individual, institutional, and affiliate members.

== History ==
The first step toward the creation of Atla came at the 1946 biennial meeting of the American Association of Theological Schools when presidents and deans in attendance asked the AATS executive committee to call a conference of theological librarians. In June 1947, fifty theological librarians, one president, and one dean met in Louisville, Kentucky, to organize a permanent association and plan the future agenda of the American Theological Library Association. The group identified six major areas to address and assigned responsibilities for them: 1. AATS Booklist, 2. Cataloging and Classification, 3. Periodical Exchange, 4. Periodical Indexing, 5. Publications, and 6. Training of Personnel.

Programs developed rapidly in the new Association, including the following milestones:

- 1952: The Committee on Religious Periodical Indexing coordinated the efforts of twenty libraries to create the first volume of the Index to Religious Periodical Literature (later Religion Index One: RIO).
- 1957: A Board of Index was established and a Board of Microtext was organized to pursue the preservation of library materials.
- 1961-1966: The Atla Library Development Program, funded by the Sealantic Fund, provided more than $1,300,000 in book and professional development funds to nearly ninety participating institutions.
- 1976: The first volume of Religion Index Two: Multi-Author Works (RIT) was published, later supplemented by a Festschriften (1960–1969) volume prepared by Elmer and Betty O'Brien and RIT: Multi-Author Works, 1970–1975.
- 1980–1984: the Lilly Foundation funded Project 2000, a study to reassess the role of libraries in theological education.
- 1981: Atla Religion Database first became available online, providing an electronic version of the print indexes.
- 1985: the ATLA's Monograph Preservation Program started to film and preserve more than 3,200 journals and 30.000 core titles concerning theology and religion practice of the 19th and 20th centuries. As of 2020, the Atla Historical Monographs Collection has reached 11 series, ranging from the 13th century to 1922, with the majority of documents originating in the 19th and early 20th centuries. The first two series provide access to more than 5 million pages.
- 1986: Book reviews were removed from the print RIO and expanded into a new product, the Index to Book Reviews in Religion (IBRR); RIO, RIT and IBRR were also available via the Religion Database.

More recent activities of Atla include:

- 2008: Established online open access journal, Theological Librarianship
- 2011: Acquired Catholic Periodical and Literature Index (CPLI) from the Catholic Library Association
- 2015: The Atla Board of Directors established a new Strategic Plan. The revised Core Purpose was adopted on February 21, 2015: To promote worldwide scholarly communication in religion and theology by advancing the work of libraries and related information providers.
- 2017: Atla launched beta released of the Atla Digital Library, which is designed to provide members and other organizations with a standards compliant, sustainable, and inter-operable hub.
- 2019: The association adopted a new brand with a dedication to becoming committed to being "Collectors & Connectors in Religion & Theology". In addition, they assumed the name Atla. They were previously known as ATLA. This was done in an effort "to honor what Atla has been while setting the stage for all Atla has yet to become".
- 2026: Atla launched Eureka, a platform for discovery offering a curated collection of resources in religion and theology. This platform was supported by a grant from the Lilly Endowment Inc.

== Publications ==
The Atla Publishing Program serves professionals engaged in librarianship and scholarly communication, students, scholars, and religious professionals in the disciplines of religion and theology by publishing original content (books, journals, newsletters, yearbooks, reports, white papers). Many of these publications include Open Access.

- Atla Newsletter (monthly)
- Summary of Proceedings (annual, ceased in 2025)
- Theology Cataloging Bulletin (quarterly, ceased in 2025)
- Theological Librarianship (online open-access journal)
- Books@Atla Open Press

== Products ==
Atla offers electronic database resources through the EBSCOhost platform to support the scholarly study of religion and theology, including Atla Religion Database (Atla RDB), AtlaSerials (Atlas), and AtlaSerials PLUS (Atlas PLUS).

Atla also oversees historical archives initiatives and works with several publishing partners to offer electronic versions of specialized bibliographic and reference products.

Atla provides products for students, scholars, researchers, faculty, and religious leaders conducting research.

== See also ==
- List of libraries in the United States
