= King's Evangelical Divinity School =

Bible college in Broadstairs, England

- KEDS
- Former name: Midlands Bible Institute
- Motto: "Rise up to your calling, reach out to your world"
- Type: Private, Evangelical
- Established: 1991 (as Midlands Bible Institute)
- Affiliations: Non-denominational Evangelical
- Academic affiliations: Columbia International University (doctoral programmes), European Council for Theological Education (member)
- Principal: Dr. Anthony Royle (since 2023)
- Location: Online (administrative base in the United Kingdom), United Kingdom
- Campus: Distance learning / Online
- Website: kingsdivinity.org

King's Evangelical Divinity School (KEDS) is a UK-based non-denominational theological institution offering distance learning programmes in biblical and theological studies. Established in 1991 as the Midlands Bible Institute, it became King's Evangelical Divinity School in 2008. The school specialises in evangelical theology, hermeneutics, and online theological education for students worldwide.

== Charity status ==
King's Evangelical Divinity School operates as a registered charity in the United Kingdom.

== Leadership ==
The principal is Anthony Royle, a biblical scholar specialising in New Testament studies and intertextuality. In 2024, he said that "it seems like 50 per cent of Christian Bible Colleges in the UK will close in the next year or two".

== Jewish–Christian studies ==
King's Evangelical Divinity School has a particular academic focus on Jewish–Christian relations and biblical studies relating to Israel and the Jewish people.

The school collaborates with Chosen People Ministries, an international mission organisation dedicated to Jewish evangelism and education, to provide resources, teaching, and joint events in Jewish–Christian studies.

The programme is directed by Rubén Gómez, a biblical researcher and specialist in Jewish–Christian relations, who oversees teaching, publications, and student engagement in this area.

== Podcasts ==
King's Evangelical Divinity School produces two podcasts as part of its teaching and outreach activities.

- Knowing Your Bible Podcast – A series exploring biblical interpretation, theology, and application for church and ministry. Episodes are hosted by members of the KEDS faculty and invited guests.
- JCS Podcast – Produced under the school's Jewish–Christian Studies programme, this podcast addresses topics such as Jewish–Christian dialogue, the Jewish roots of Christianity, and biblical studies related to Israel.

Both podcasts are distributed on platforms including Spotify and YouTube, and are designed to make theological discussion accessible to a wider audience of students, pastors, and interested listeners.

== Affiliations ==
- Member of the Evangelical Alliance, a UK-based network of evangelical churches, organisations, and educational institutions.

== See also ==
- Evangelicalism
