= Religious and Theological Abstracts =

Academic database

- Producer: Religious and Theological Abstracts (United States)
- History: 1958 to present

Coverage
- Disciplines: Religion

Print edition
- ISSN: 0034-4044

Links
- Website: www.rtabstracts.org
- Title list(s): www.rtabstracts.org/journals-we-abstract.php

Religious and Theological Abstracts is a database that indexes many religious and theological journals and other literature. In 2005, one Guide to Research described it as a "popular reference" covering more than 600 periodicals in most major European languages (plus Hebrew and Afrikaans) beginning in 1948. It covers, "a wide array of periodical literature, including Christian, Jewish, and other world religions and some denominational and popular religious magazines."

A guide to how to acquire documents for libraries stated, that

Because of the interrelationship between indexing and abstract services and the literature that they document, tools such as Religious and Theological Abstracts (1958-, Myerstown, PA), Religion Index One (1949-, Evanston, IL), and The Catholic Periodical and Literature Index (1930-, Catholic Library Association) often become de facto standards against which many librarians measure their collections. If a journal is indexed by one of these services, it becomes important on the grounds that the index service provides access points to the information contained in the articles themselves.

A guide to library research stated that "religion has its primary indexes in Religion Index One, Religion Index Two, Religious and Theological Abstracts, and a few other such titles."

In 2021, the journal had five staff and 25 volunteers.

The original editor was J. Creighton Christman; in 2024, the editor is William Sailer.
