= Atla Religion Database =

Academic journal article database

- Producer: American Theological Library Association (United States)

Access
- Providers: EBSCO
- Cost: Subscription

Coverage
- Disciplines: Theology, religious studies
- Format coverage: Journal articles, essays, book reviews
- Temporal coverage: 1949–present, with retrospective indexing for some journals back to the nineteenth century
- Geospatial coverage: Global
- No. of records: Over 2.1 million
- Update frequency: Monthly

Links
- Website: www.atla.com/products/prodinfo/Pages/ATLA-RDB.aspx
- Title list(s): www.atla.com/products/titles/Pages/default.aspx

The Atla Religion Database (ATLA RDB) is an index of academic journal articles in the area of religion. It is updated monthly and published by the American Theological Library Association. The database indexes articles, essays, and book reviews related to a wide range of scholarly fields related to religion. The database is available on a subscription basis through a database aggregator.

The total database includes over 3.0 million article citations from over 2,400+ journals. There are more than a quarter of a million essay citations from more than 18,000 multi-author works. The number of book reviews is over half a million. Atla indexes multi-author works, such as Festschriften and conference proceedings, with separate records for each essay.

== Formats ==
The Atla Religion Database, formerly available on CD-ROM, is a MARC record format database that incorporates several out-of-print indexes, including Religion Index One: Periodicals, Religion Index Two: Multi-Author Works, and Index to Book Reviews in Religion.

== Coverage ==
The database indexes scholarly works on major world religions. There are, however, selection criteria for inclusion according to scholarly merit and scope. More than 60 languages are represented. Some records cover articles as far back as the 19th century. Atla claims full coverage for core journals back to 1949.

Scholarly fields with significant degrees of coverage include:

- Ancient history
- Anthropology
- Archaeology
- Bible
- Church history
- Ethics
- Mission
- Philosophy
- Pastoral ministry
- Religious studies
- Theology
- Human Culture & Society
- Ecumenism
- World religions

== See also ==
- List of academic databases and search engines
