= List of renewal theologians =

Renewal theologians are those theologians who represent the Pentecostal, Charismatic and Neocharismatic movements. Notable renewal theologians are noted under the grouping with which they are most closely identified.

== Pentecostal theologians ==
- Gordon Fee – Assemblies of God
- Simon Chan – Assemblies of God
- Stanley M. Horton – Assemblies of God
- Cheryl Bridges Johns – Church of God (Cleveland)
- Jackie David Johns – Church of God (Cleveland)
- Rufus Hollis Gause – Church of God (Cleveland)
- Steven Jack Land – Church of God (Cleveland)
- French L. Arrington – Church of God (Cleveland)
- Estrelda Alexander – Church of God (Cleveland)
- Harold D. Hunter – International Pentecostal Holiness Church
- John Harris – Church of God/Church of the Redeemer
- James A. Forbes – United Holy Church of America/American Baptist Churches, USA
- Donald Gee
- Nimi Wariboko – Redeemed Christian Church of God
- Amos Yong – Assemblies of God
- Frank Macchia – Assemblies of God
- Terry Cross – Church of God (Cleveland)
- Raiford Doc Hughes III – Church of God (Cleveland)
- Verna M. Linzey – Assemblies of God
- Russell P. Spittler – Assemblies of God
- Wolfgang Vondey – Church of God (Cleveland)
- Clifton R. Clarke – Church of God (Cleveland)
- Kenneth Archer – Church of God (Cleveland)
- Daniela C. Augustine – Church of God (Cleveland)

== Pentecostal Biblical scholars ==
- Marcel V. Măcelaru – Christian Pentecostal Denomination (Romania)
- Robert P. Menzies – Assemblies of God
- Rickie D. Moore – Church of God (Cleveland)
- Roger J. Stronstad – Pentecostal Assemblies of Canada)
- John Christopher Thomas – Church of God (Cleveland)

== Pentecostal historians ==
- H. Vinson Synan – International Pentecostal Holiness Church
- Kimberly Ervin Alexander – Church of God (Cleveland)
- David Roebuck – Church of God Cleveland TN
- Gary W. Garrett – Apostolic Archives
- Bernie L. Wade – International Circle of Faith (ICOF)
- Cecil M. Robeck – Assemblies of God
- Connie Au – Charismatic Renewal Movement

== Charismatic theologians ==
- J. Rodman Williams
- David Pawson
- Derek Prince
- Peter Bellini

== Neocharismatic Biblical scholars ==
- Graham Twelftree – Vineyard movement

== Neocharismatic theologians ==
- Wayne Grudem
- Jack Deere
- C. Peter Wagner
- Charles H. Kraft
- Michael L. Brown
