= Society for Pentecostal Studies =

Learned society based in Tulsa, Oklahoma

The Society for Pentecostal Studies (SPS) is an American scholarly association of biblical scholars, Protestant theologians, and others who are members of Evangelical and Pentecostal churches and/or are involved in the Charismatic Renewal. It was founded in 1970 and is currently based in Tulsa, Oklahoma. The members of the Society consider themselves responsible for recording the history and developing the theology of these grassroots movements that have influenced Christianity worldwide.

== Overview ==
The Society for Pentecostal Studies was first envisioned by three classical Pentecostals: Dr. William W. Menzies of the Assemblies of God USA, Dr. H. Vinson Synan of the International Pentecostal Holiness Church, and Dr. Horace Ward of the Church of God. The original requirement for membership was adherence to the statement of faith of the Pentecostal Fellowship of North America (PCCNA). However, because Oneness Pentecostals and Christians from other Protestant denominations were unable to sign the statement for doctrinal reasons, this requirement was eventually eliminated.

The purpose of the SPS, as defined on its website, is to provide a scholarly forum in which to interpret the Pentecostal movement as well as "to stimulate, encourage, recognize, and publicize the work of Pentecostal and Charismatic scholars and scholars of Pentecostalism; to study the implications of Pentecostal theology in relation to other academic disciplines, seeking a Pentecostal world-and-life view; and to support fully, to the extent appropriate for an academic society, the following statement of purposes:

- To encourage fellowship and facilitate co-ordination of effort among Pentecostal believers throughout the world.
- To demonstrate to the world the essential unity of Spirit-baptized believers, fulfilling the prayer of the Lord Jesus Christ, "That they all may be one" (John 17:21).
- To cooperate in an endeavor to respond to the unchanging commission of the Lord Jesus, to carry His message to all people of all nations.
- To promote courtesy and mutual understanding, "endeavoring to keep the unity of the Spirit in the bond of peace, until we all come in the unity of the faith" (Ephesians 4:3–13).
- To afford prayerful and practical assistance to any Pentecostal body in need of such.
- To promote and maintain the scriptural purity of the Society by Bible study and prayer.
- To uphold and maintain those Pentecostal truths, "most surely believed among us" (Luke 1:1).

== Past presidents ==
- William W. Menzies (1971)
- R. Hollis Gause (1972)
- Russell P. Spittler (1973)
- H. Vinson Synan (1974)
- Leonard Lovett (1975)
- Don Argue (1976)
- Horace S. Ward (1977)
- Anthony Palma (1978)
- James Beaty (1979)
- Stanley M. Horton (1980)
- Ithiel Clemmons (1981)
- William G. MacDonald (1982)
- Cecil M. Robeck Jr. (1983)
- Harold D. Hunter (1984)
- J. Rodman Williams (1985)
- Peter Hocken (1986)
- Edith Waldvogel Blumhofer (1987)
- Ronald Kydd (1988)
- Donald W. Dayton (1989)
- Manuel J. Gaxiola-Gaxiola (1990)
- Murray W. Dempster (1991)
- D. William Faupel (1992)
- Cheryl Bridges Johns (1993)
- Roger Stronstad (1994)
- Eldin Villafañe (1996)
- Grant Wacker (1997)
- J. Chris Thomas (1998)
- Rebecca Skaggs (1999)
- Frank D. Macchia (2000)
- Sherry DuPree (2001)
- Samuel Solivan (2002)
- Ralph Del Colle (2003)
- Steven Jack Land (2004)
- Anthea Butler (2005)
- Blaine Charette (2006)
- David Daniels (2007)
- Terry Cross (2008)
- Amos Yong (2009)
- Estrelda Alexander (2010)
- Kimberly Ervin Alexander (2011)
- Jeff Gros (2012)
- Paul Alexander (2013)
- Lee Roy Martin (2014)
- Kenneth J. Archer (2015)
- Michael Wilkinson (2016)
- Jacqueline Grey (2017)
- Mark Cartledge (2018)
- Martin Mittelstadt (2019)
- No Conference - Covid 19 (2020)
- Martin Mittelstadt (2021)
- Melissa Archer (2022)
- Peter Althouse (2023)
- Sammy Alfaro (2024)
- Lois Olena (2025)

== Society for Pentecostal Studies Annual Meeting Themes ==
- Following the Spirit of Truth (1971)
- Higher Education within the Pentecostal Perspective (1972)
- Perspectives on the New Pentecostalism (1973)
- Aspects of Pentecostal Origins (1974)
- The Third Force and The Third World (1975)
- The Pentecostal and Charismatic Movements: Where Are They? Where Are They Going? (1976)
- The Biblical Basis of the Pentecostal Faith (1977)
- Aspects of Pentecostal Practical Theology (1978)
- The Holy Spirit in the Community of Faith (1979)
- The Holy Spirit in the Last Days (1980)
- Contemporary Issues in Pentecostalism (1981)
- The Spirit and Regeneration in John's Gospel (1982)
- Gifts of the Spirit (1983)
- Pastoral Problems in the Pentecostal-Charismatic Movement (1984)
- Toward a Pentecostal/Charismatic Theology: Baptism in the Holy Spirit (1985)
- The Distinctiveness of Pentecostal-Charismatic Theology (1986)
- Azusa Street Revisited: Facets of the American Pentecostal Experience (1987)
- Probing Pentecostalism (1988)
- Pentecostalism in the Context of the Holiness Revival (1989)
- New and Old Issues in Pentecostalism (1990)
- Continuity and Change in the Pentecostal and Charismatic Movements (1991)
- Decades of Expectancy 1891-1900, 1991-2000 (1992)
- Drinking from Our Own Wells: Defining a Pentecostal-Charismatic Spirituality (1993)
- To the Ends of the Earth (1994)
- Affirming Diversity (1995)
- Memory and Hope: The Society for Pentecostal Studies at 25 Years (1996)
- The Fivefold Gospel (1997)
- Purity & Power: Revisioning Holiness/Pentecostal/Charismatic Movements for the 21st Century (1998)
- Toward Healing Our Divisions: Reflecting on Pentecostal Diversity and Common Witness (1999)
- Pentecostal Mission at 2000: Issues Home and Abroad (2000)
- Teaching to Make Disciples: Education for Pentecostal-Charismatic Spirituality and Life (2001)
- Pentecostalism and the World Church: Ecumenical Opportunities and Challenges (2002)
- Wesleyan/Pentecostal Movements for a New Century: Crucial Choices, Essential Contributions (2003)
- Pentecostalism and the Body (2004)
- That Which We Have Received We Now Pass On: Spirit, Word, and Tradition in Pentecostalism (2005)
- Memories of The Azusa Street Revival: Interrogations and Interpretations (2006)
- The Role of Experience in Christian Life and Thought: Pentecostal Insights (2007)
- Sighs, Signs, and Significance: Pentecostal and Wesleyan Explorations of Science and Creation (2008)
- Pentecostal/Charismatic Intersections: What Does the Spirit Have to Say Through the Academy? (2009)
- New Voices, New Visions: Future and Hope of Pentecostal Theology (2010)
- Receiving the Future: An Anointed Heritage (2011)
- Converge21: Joint Meeting with Empowered21 (2012)
- Holiness (2013)
- Hermeneutics and the Spirit: Identities, Communities, and Making of Meaning (2014)
- Global Spirit: Pentecostals and the World (2015)
- Worship, the Arts, and the Spirit (2016)
- Pentecostalism and Culture (2017)
- The Good News of the Kingdom and the Poor in the Land (2018)
- Reception History: Receiving Scripture in the Pentecostal & Charismatic Traditions (2019)
- "This Is My Body": Addressing Global Violence Against Women (2021)
- Advancing the Study of Pentecostalism: New Directions & Future Possibilities (2022)
- "In our own tongues" Amplifying Pentecostalism's Minoritized Voices (2023)
- "I was a stranger and you took me in" — Pentecostal responses to the Refugee Crisis (2024)
- "More than a Song" — Scholarship as Worship In the Church, the Academy, and the Public Square (2025)
- “Communing with the Spirit” — The Promise and Power of Pentecostal Prayer (2026)

== Executive directors ==
- Vinson Synan (1970)
- James Beaty (1973)
- Horace Ward (1978)
- Vinson Synan (1980)
- Russell P. Spittler (1983)
- Peter Hocken (1988)
- D. William Faupel (1997)
- David Roebuck (2004)
- Lois E. Olena (2011)
- Margaret English de Alminana (2016)
- Adrian Hinkle (2019)

== Pneuma: The Journal of the Society for Pentecostal Studies ==
Pneuma: The Journal of the Society for Pentecostal Studies, a peer-reviewed theological journal and the official publication of the Society for Pentecostal Studies, is published by BRILL since 1979. Dr. William W. Menzies (Evangel College) served as its first editor-in-chief. The current editor-in-chief is L. William Oliverio (Northwest University).

== See also ==
- Charismatic Christianity
  - Assemblies of God
  - Finished Work Pentecostalism
  - Holiness Pentecostalism
  - Third Wave of the Holy Spirit
- Christian ecumenism
- Decision theology
- Protestantism in the United States
  - Baptists in the United States
  - Evangelicalism in the United States
  - Pentecostalism in the United States
- Wesleyan theology
  - Holiness movement
