= Wolfgang Vondey =

German-born Pentecostal theologian and educator

Wolfgang Vondey (born 15 November 1967) is a German-born Pentecostal theologian who currently serves as Professor of Christian Theology and Pentecostal Studies at the University of Birmingham, United Kingdom, where he also directs the Centre for Pentecostal and Charismatic Studies.

== Biography ==
Vondey was the professor of systematic theology at Regent University School of Divinity (Virginia Beach, VA, USA) until 2015, where he also founded and directed the Regent Center for Renewal Studies. Vondey’s Ph.D. from Marquette University is in systematic theology and ethics, and he also has a M.Div. from the Pentecostal Theological Seminary (Cleveland, Tennessee), and M.A. from University of Marburg, Germany. After completing his doctoral dissertation on the work on the Holy Spirit by Roman Catholic theologian, Heribert Mühlen, he went on to author several books on Pentecostalism and Pentecostal theology. He is a member of the steering committee of the European Research Network on Global Pentecostalism, associate editor of the journal, PentecoStudies, and co-editor of the monograph series, CHARIS: Christianity & Renewal - Interdisciplinary Studies (Palgrave Macmillan) and Systematic Pentecostal and Charismatic Theology (Bloomsbury T&T Clark). He organized the ecumenical studies group of the Society for Pentecostal Studies in 2001 and served as its chair until 2005. A classically trained systematic theologian, Vondey is considered a renewal theologian whose work addresses concerns of pneumatology, ecclesiology, ecumenical theology, and the intersection of theology and science. Perhaps his most popular work is his ecclesiology, People of Bread, while his most controversial work is Beyond Pentecostalism: The Crisis of Global Christianity and the Renewal of the Theological Agenda (Eerdmans, 2010). His book, Pentecostal Theology: Living the Full Gospel, proposes a systematic and constructive Pentecostal theology on the historical motif of the full gospel, and received the Pneuma Book Award of the Society for Pentecostal Studies in 2018. He is the editor of the Journal of the European Pentecostal Theological Association since 2019. He is the program chair for the 2027 Society for Pentecostal Studies.

== Works ==
- Heribert Mühlen: His Theology and Praxis. A New Profile of the Church (2004) ISBN 0761828176
- People of Bread: Rediscovering Ecclesiology (2008) ISBN 9780809145591
- Beyond Pentecostalism: The Crisis of Global Christianity and the Renewal of the Theological Agenda (2010) ISBN 978-0802864017
- Pentecostalism and Christian Unity: Ecumenical Documents and Critical Assessments (2010) ISBN 978-0801027703
- Pentecostalism and Christian Unity Volume 2: Continuing and Building Relationships (2013) ISBN 978-1620327180
- Pentecostalism: A Guide for the Perplexed (2013) ISBN 978-0567522269
- The Theology of Amos Yong and the New Face of Pentecostal Scholarship: Passion for the Spirit (2013) ISBN 978-9004251748
- The Holy Spirit and the Christian Life: Historical, Interdisciplinary, and Renewal Perspectives (2014) ISBN 978-1137378125
- Pentecostal Theology: Living the Full Gospel (2017) ISBN 978-0567275394
- The Routledge Handbook of Pentecostal Theology (2020) ISBN 978-1138580893
- The Scandal of Pentecost: A Theology of the Public Church (2024) ISBN 978-0567712646
