= Linzey =

Linzey is the family name of

- Andrew Linzey (born 1952), English theologist and author
- Clair Linzey, English theologist, animal ethicist and writer
- James F. Linzey (born 1958), American theologist
- Verna M. Linzey (1919–2006), American theologist

Linzey is the given name of

- Linzey Cocker (born 1987), English actress
