= Renewal (religion) =

Renewal is the collective term for Charismatic, Pentecostal, and Neo-charismatic churches. According to the World Christian Database, there are nearly 80 million renewalists in the United States, including pentecostals, charismatics and neo-charismatics.

== Neo-charismatic churches ==
The neo-charismatic denominations have more than a million members in China. In Vietnam, the Montagnard Evangelical Church is one of the largest Christian denominations.

== Pentecostal churches ==
In Myanmar, the Assemblies of God of Myanmar is one of the largest Christian denominations. The pentecostal churches Igreja do Evangelho Completo de Deus, Assembleias de Deus, and the Assembleias Evangelicas de Deus Pentecostales are among the largest denominations of Mozambique. Indonesia has the pentecostal church Gereja Pantekosta di Indonesia. Nigeria has the Assemblies of God and the Church of the Lord (Aladura).

== Renewal churches ==
- Apostolic Church of Pentecost
- Apostolic Pentecostal Church
- Assemblies of Christ Church
- Assemblies of God
- Association of Vineyard Churches
- Believers' Churches in India
- Bible Brethren Fellowship
- Bible Christian Mission
- Bible Pattern Church
- Blessing Youth Mission
- Christian Fellowship Centre
- Church of God of Prophecy
- Church of God (Full Gospel) in India
- Church of the Apostolic Faith
- Elim Church
- Eternal Light Ministries
- Fellowship of Evangelical Friends
- Fellowship of Gospel Churches
- Filadelfia Fellowship
- Gospel Echoing Missionary Society
- International Church of the Foursquare Gospel
- Nagaland Christian Revival Church
- Native Missionary Movement
- New Life Churches
- New Life Fellowship Association
- New Life Outreach
- New Testament Church of India,
- Open Bible Church of God
- Orissa Missionary Movement
- Pentecostal Free Will Baptist Church
- Pentecostal Holiness Church
- Pentecostal Mission
- Prince of Peace Church
- Rajasthan Bible Institute
- Reaching Indians Ministries
- Tamil Christian Fellowship
- United Pentecostal Church in India

== See also ==
- Born Again Movement
- Church renewal
- Pentecostal Charismatic Peace Fellowship
- Renewal theologian

== Sources ==
- World Christian Encyclopedia. 2001. (2nd ed.) Oxford University Press.
- Burgess, Stanley M. (ed.) The New International Dictionary of Pentecostal and Charismatic Movements. Grand Rapids: Zondervan.
