= Peter Hocken =

British theologian and historian (1932-2017)

Peter Hocken (22 June 1932 – 10 June 2017) was a British theologian and historian of the Catholic Charismatic Renewal and the Pentecostal movement in the twentieth century.

Born in Brighton, England, Hocken was ordained a priest in the Roman Catholic Church for the Diocese of Northampton in 1964. He lectured in moral theology at Oscott College, Birmingham, England (1968 – 1976). He obtained permission to leave the country in order to join the Mother of God Community, Washington DC, United States, where he was an active member between 1976 and 1996. He regularly contributed to the community's devotional magazine, "The Word Among Us". In 1984, he received his PhD for his research on the history of charismatic renewal from the University of Birmingham, England. Hocken returned to England in 1997, becoming Chaplain to the Bishop of Northampton (1997 – 2001). In 2001, he received the title "Monsignor" at the request of Bishop Patrick Leo McCartie. From 2008 to 2017, Hocken lived in Hainburg an der Donau, Austria.

Hocken was active in the charismatic movement from 1971 on and served as Executive Secretary of the Society for Pentecostal Studies from 1988 to 1997. He was a member of the unofficial Catholic – Messianic Jewish dialogue (from 2000) and also served as a member of the Theology Commission for the International Catholic Charismatic Renewal (from 2003). He wrote a wide range of books on Charismatic Renewal, Christian unity and Messianic Judaism. He died on 10 June 2017, aged 84.

== Bibliography ==
- Streams of Renewal (1986, revised 1997)
- One Lord One Spirit One Body (1987)
- Dictionary of Pentecostal and Charismatic Movements (1988) – many articles
- The Glory and the Shame (1994)
- The Strategy of the Spirit? (1996)
- Blazing the Trail: Where Is The Holy Spirit Leading The Church? (2001)
- The Spirit of Unity: How Renewal is Breaking Down Barriers between Evangelicals and Roman Catholics (2001)
- Toward Jerusalem Council Two: The Vision and the Story (2002, revised 2004)
- The New International Dictionary of Pentecostal and Charismatic Movements (2002) – many articles
- God's Masterplan: Penetrating the Mystery of Christ (2003)
- The Banquet of Life: The Dignity of the Human Person (2004)
- The Messianic Jewish Movement, with Daniel Juster (2004)
- The Marranos (2006)
- Church Forward: Reflections on the Renewal of the Church (2007)
- The Challenges of the Pentcostal, Charismatic and Messianic Jewish Movements (2009)
- Pentecost and Parousia: Charismatic Renewal, Christian Unity, and the Coming Glory (2014)
- Azusa, Rome and Zion (2016)
