= Rickie D. Moore =

American theologian

Rickie D. Moore is an American renewal theologian within the Pentecostal movement. He is now the Associate Dean of the Lee University School of Religion.

Moore received a B.A. from Lee College in 1976, his M.A. from Vanderbilt University in 1982 and a Ph.D. from Vanderbilt in 1988. He is an ordained bishop of the Church of God, and was appointed to the faculty of the Church of God Theological Seminary in 1982, becoming Professor of Old Testament Studies.

Moore's Vanderbilt University Ph.D. dissertation on the Elisha Stories in II Kings was revised and published with Sheffield Academic Press under the title, God Saves: Lessons From the Elisha Stories. Together with his seminary colleagues, John Christopher Thomas and Steven Jack Land, Moore is a founding editor of the Journal of Pentecostal Theology, the first academic series ever to feature constructive theology from a Pentecostal perspective on an international, scholarly level. Moore received a major research grant in 1994 by the Association of Theological Schools to study the relationship of charisma and canon in the Old Testament.
