= Amos Yong =

Malaysian-American Pentecostal scholar (born 1965)

- Born: July 26, 1965 (age 61); Malaysia
- Other name: 楊偉明
- Occupations: Scholar, Theologian, Dean
- Known for: Asian-American Pent-Evangelical Theology; Pentecostal Theology
- Title: Dean of School of Theology and School of Intercultural Studies at Fuller Seminary

Academic background
- Education: PhD, Boston University
- Alma mater: Bethany College; Western Evangelical Seminary; Portland State University; Boston University
- Thesis: “Discerning the Spirit(s): A Pentecostal-Charismatic Contribution to Christian Theology of Religions.” (1999)

Academic work
- Discipline: Theology
- Sub-discipline: Global Pentecostalism, pneumatology, theology and science, missiology, constructive theology, political theology, disability theology, comparative theology, theology of religions, Buddhist–Christian dialogue
- School or tradition: Pentecostalism
- Institutions: Regent University; Fuller Theological Seminary
- Notable works: Spirit-Word-Community (2002)
- Notable ideas: Pentecostal Theology of Religions
- Website: https://fuller.edu/faculty/amos-yong/

Amos Yong (Chinese: 楊偉明; born July 26, 1965) is a Malaysian-American Pentecostal theologian and Professor of Theology and Mission at Fuller Theological Seminary. He has been Dean of School of Theology and School of Intercultural Studies at Fuller Seminary, since July 1, 2019.

== Biography ==
Yong was born in Malaysia and immigrated to the United States. His Ph.D. from Boston University is in religion and theology, and he has a B.A. from Bethany College, an M.A. from Western Evangelical Seminary, and an M.A. from Portland State University. He was the J. Rodman Williams Professor of Theology and Dean at Regent University School of Divinity (Virginia Beach, VA) until June 2014. Since July 1, 2014, Yong has been Professor of Theology & Mission at Fuller Theological Seminary and director of the Fuller Theological Seminary's Center for Missiological Research. He was Dean of School of Theology and School of Intercultural Studies at Fuller Seminary, effective July 1, 2019.

Amos came to Fuller Theological Seminary in 2014 as a Professor of Missions and was named the Dean for the School of Intercultural Studies in 2019.

== Pentecostal Studies ==
In the last decade, Amos has become one of the most prolific writers among Pentecostal theologians in the academy. He has devoted scholarly monographs to interreligious dialogue and comparative theology, global Pentecostal theology, theology of disability, political theology, dialogue between science and religion, and theology of love. What may be his most important book (Spirit-Word-Community) is an articulation of a trinitarian theological method and hermeneutic that provides the conceptual basis for all his other work. In it he demonstrates his ability to bring a Pentecostal account of pneumatology to bear on a number of perennial theological and philosophical concerns, and thus shows that he is not interested only in parochial Pentecostal issues. Yong's main generative energy (his "pneumatological imagination") for theological work is his paradigmatic use of the "many tongues" from Acts 2 and his "Spirit-Word-Community" framework.

He is a former president of the Society for Pentecostal Studies (2008 – 09) and co-edited its journal, PNEUMA from 2011 – 2014. He was the founding co-chair for the Pentecostal-Charismatic Movements Group for the American Academy of hope and Religion (2006 – 2011) and is co-editor of five monograph series: Pentecostal Manifestos (Eerdmans), Studies in Religion, Theology and Disability (Baylor), CHARIS: Christianity & Renewal – Interdisciplinary Studies (Palgrave Macmillan), Missiological Engagements (IVP Academic), and Mission in Global Community (Baker Academic).

== Partial bibliography ==
=== Monographs/Books ===
1. Discerning the Spirit(s): A Pentecostal-Charismatic Contribution to Christian Theology of Religions (Sheffield, UK: Sheffield Academic Press, 2000) ISBN 978-1-84127-133-0
2. Spirit-Word-Community: Theological Hermeneutics in Trinitarian Perspective (Burlington, VT: Ashgate Publishing Ltd., 2002) ISBN 978-0-7546-0541-6
3. Beyond the Impasse: Toward a Pneumatological Theology of Religions (Grand Rapids, MI: Baker Academic, 2003) ISBN 978-0-8010-2612-6
4. The Spirit Poured Out on All Flesh: Pentecostalism and the Possibility of Global Theology (Grand Rapids, MI: Baker Academic, 2005) ISBN 978-0-8010-2770-3
5. Theology and Down Syndrome: Reimagining Disability in Late Modernity (Waco, TX: Baylor University Press, 2007) ISBN 978-1-60258-006-0
6. Hospitality and the Other: Pentecost, Christian Practices, and the Neighbor (Maryknoll, NY: Orbis Books, 2008) ISBN 9781570757723
7. In the Days of Caesar: Pentecostalism and Political Theology (Grand Rapids, MI: William B. Eerdmans Publishing Company, 2010) ISBN 9780802864062
8. Who is the Holy Spirit? A Walk with the Apostles (Brewster, MA: Paraclete Press, 2011) ISBN 9781557256355
9. The Spirit of Creation: Modern Science and Divine Action in the Pentecostal-Charismatic Imagination (Grand Rapids, MI: William B. Eerdmans Publishing Company, 2011) ISBN 9780802866127
10. The Bible, Disability, and the Church: A New Vision of the People of God (Grand Rapids, MI: William B. Eerdmans Publishing Company, 2011) ISBN 9780802866080
11. Spirit of Love: A Trinitarian Theology of Grace (Waco, TX: Baylor University Press, 2012) ISBN 978-1-60258-326-9
12. The Cosmic Breath: Spirit and Nature in the Christianity-Buddhism-Science Trialogue (Leiden: Brill, 2012) ISBN 9789004205130
13. Pneumatology and the Christian-Buddhist Dialogue: Does the Spirit Blow through the Middle Way? (Leiden: Brill, 2012) ISBN 9789004231177
14. Penticostalismul global: Traiectorii teologice ?i impact social (Bucaresti: Editura Pleroma, 2013) ISBN 978-606-92096-3-9
15. The Future of Evangelical Theology: Soundings from the Asian American Diaspora (Downers Grove, IL: IVP Academic, 2014) ISBN 978-0-8308-4060-1
16. Renewing Christian Theology: Systematics for a Global Christianity (Waco, TX: Baylor University Press, 2014) ISBN 9781602587618
17. The Missiological Spirit: Christian Mission Theology for the Third Millennium Global Context (Eugene, OR: Cascade Books, 2014) ISBN 978-1-62564-670-5
18. The Dialogical Spirit: Christian Reason and Theological Method for the Third Millennium (Eugene, OR: Cascade Books, 2014) ISBN 978-1-62564-564-7
19. The Hermeneutical Spirit: Theological Interpretation and the Scriptural Imagination for the 21st Century (Eugene, OR: Cascade Books, 2017) ISBN 978-1-5326-0489-8
20. Learning Theology: Tracking the Spirit of Christian Faith (Louisville, KY: Westminster John Knox Press, 2018) ISBN 978-0-664-26396-6
21. The Kerygmatic Spirit: Apostolic Preaching in the 21st Century (Eugene, OR: Cascade Books, 2018) ISBN 978-1-4982-9817-9
22. Mission after Pentecost: The Witness of the Spirit from Genesis to Revelation (Grand Rapids, MI: Baker Academic, 2019) ISBN 978-1-5409-6115-0
23. Renewing the Church by the Spirit: Theological Education after Pentecost (Grand Rapids, MI: William B. Eerdmans Publishing Company, 2020) ISBN 978-0-8028-7840-3
24. An Amos Yong Reader: The Pentecostal Spirit (Eugene, OR: Cascade Books, 2020) ISBN 978-1-7252-5089-5
25. Revelation, Belief: A Theological Commentary on the Bible (Louisville, KY: Westminster John Knox Press, 2021) ISBN 978-0-664-23248-1
26. The Holy Spirit and Higher Education: Renewing the Christian University (Waco, TX: Baylor University Press, 2023) ISBN 978-1-4813-1814-3
27. The Dialogical Spirit II: Contextual God, Pluralistic Selves, and Dialectical Imagination after Pentecost (Eugene, OR: Cascade Books, 2024) ISBN 978-1-6667-0526-3

=== Edited volumes ===
1. Editor, Toward a Pneumatological Theology: Pentecostal and Ecumenical Perspectives on Ecclesiology, Soteriology and Theology of Mission, by Veli-Matti Kärkkäinen (Lanham, MD: University Press of America, 2002) ISBN 978-0-7618-2389-6
2. Editor, with Peter Heltzel, Theology in Global Context: Essays in Honor of Robert Cummings Neville (New York: T & T Clark, 2004) ISBN 978-0-567-02690-3
3. Editor, Philip's Daughters: Women in Pentecostal-Charismatic Leadership (Eugene, OR: Pickwick Publications, 2009) ISBN 978-1-55635-832-6
4. Editor, The Spirit Renews the Face of the Earth: Pentecostal Forays in Science and Theology of Creation (Eugene, OR: Pickwick Publications, 2009) ISBN 978-1-60608-196-9
5. Editor, with James K. A. Smith, Science and the Spirit: A Pentecostal Engagement with the Sciences (Bloomington, IN: Indiana University Press, 2010) ISBN 978-0-253-35516-4
6. Editor, with Barbara Brown Zikmund, Remembering Jamestown: Hard Questions about Christian Mission (Eugene, OR: Pickwick Publications, 2010) ISBN 9781608991969
7. Editor, with Clifton Clarke, Global Renewal, Religious Pluralism, and the Great Commission: Toward a Renewal Theology of Mission and Interreligious Encounter (Lexington, KY: Emeth Press, 2011) ISBN 9780981958286
8. Editor, with Estrelda Y. Alexander, Afro-Pentecostalism: Black Pentecostal and Charismatic Christianity in History and Culture (New York: New York University Press, 2011) ISBN 978-0-8147-9731-0
9. Editor, with Katherine Attanasi, Pentecostalism and Prosperity: The Socioeconomics of the Global Charismatic Movement (New York: Palgrave Macmillan, 2012) ISBN 978-0-230-33828-9
10. Editor, with Matthew T. Lee, The Science and Theology of Godly Love (DeKalb, IL: Northern Illinois University Press, 2012) ISBN 978-0-87580-449-1
11. Editor, with Matthew T. Lee, Godly Love: Impediments and Possibilities (Lanham, MD: Lexington Books, 2012) ISBN 978-0-7391-6787-8
12. Editor, with Veli-Matti Kärkkäinen and Kirsteen Kim, Interdisciplinary and Religio-Cultural Discourses on a Spirit-Filled World: Loosing the Spirits (New York: Palgrave Macmillan, 2013) ISBN 978-1-137-26898-3
13. Editor, with Chandler H. Im, Global Diasporas and Mission (Oxford: Regnum Books International, 2014) ISBN 978-1-908355-48-5
14. Editor, with Cecil M. Robeck, Jr., The Cambridge Companion to Pentecostalism (Cambridge: Cambridge University Press, 2014) ISBN 978-1-107-00709-3
15. Editor, with Scott Sunquist, The Gospel and Pluralism Today: Reassessing Lesslie Newbigin for the 21st Century (Downers Grove, IL: IVP Academic, 2015) ISBN 978-0-8308-5094-5
16. Editor, with Nimi Wariboko, Paul Tillich and Pentecostal Theology: Spiritual Presence and Spiritual Power (Bloomington, IN: Indiana University Press, 2015) ISBN 978-0-253-01802-1
17. Editor, with Monique Ingalls, The Spirit of Praise: Music and Worship in Global Pentecostal-Charismatic Christianity (University Park, PA: Penn State University Press, 2015) ISBN 978-0-271-06662-2
18. Editor, with Vinson Synan, Global Renewal Christianity: Spirit-Empowered Movements Past, Present, and Future, vol. I: Asia and Oceania (Lake Mary, FL: Charisma House Publishers, 2016) ISBN 978-1-62998-688-3
19. Editor, with Vinson Synan and Miguel Álvarez, Global Renewal Christianity: Spirit-Empowered Movements Past, Present, and Future, vol. II: Latin America (Lake Mary, FL: Charisma House Publishers, 2016) ISBN 978-1-62998-767-5
20. Editor, with Vinson Synan and J. Kwabena Asamoah-Gyadu, Global Renewal Christianity: Spirit-Empowered Movements Past, Present, and Future, vol. III: Africa (Lake Mary, FL: Charisma House Publishers, 2016) ISBN 978-1-62998-768-2
21. Editor, with Dale M. Coulter, The Spirit, the Affections, and the Christian Tradition (Notre Dame, IN: University of Notre Dame Press, 2016) ISBN 978-0-268-10004-9
22. Editor, with Sarah J. Melcher and Mikeal C. Parsons, The Bible and Disability: A Commentary (Waco, TX: Baylor University Press, 2017) ISBN 978-1-60258-621-5
23. Editor, with Vinson Synan, Global Renewal Christianity: Spirit-Empowered Movements Past, Present, and Future, vol. IV: Europe and North America (Lake Mary, FL: Charisma House Publishers, 2017) ISBN 978-1-62998-943-3
24. Editor, with Love L. Sechrest and Johnny Ramírez-Johnson, Can "White" People Be Saved? Triangulating Race, Theology, and Mission (Downers Grove, IL: IVP Academic, 2018) ISBN 978-0-8308-5104-1
25. Editor, with Steven M. Studebaker, Pentecostal Theology and Jonathan Edwards (New York: Bloomsbury, 2019) ISBN 978-0-567-68787-6
26. Editor, with David J. Downs and Tina Houston-Armstrong, Vocation, Formation, and Theological Education: Interdisciplinary Perspectives from Fuller Theological Seminary (Claremont, CA: CST Press, 2021) ISBN 978-1-946230-48-5
27. Editor, with Elaine Wei-Fun Goh, Kah-Jin Jeffrey Kuan, and Jonathan Yun-Ka Tan, From Malaysia to the Ends of the Earth: Southeast Asian and Diasporic Contributions to Biblical and Theological Studies (Claremont, CA: CST Press, 2021) ISBN 9781946230577
28. Editor, with Patrick Oden and Peter Goodwin Heltzel, The Dialogical Evangelical Theology of Veli-Matti Kärkkäinen: Exploring the Work of God in a Diverse Church and a Pluralistic World (Lanham, MD: Lexington Books/Fortress Academic, 2022) ISBN 978-1-9787-1035-1
29. Editor, with Mark A. Lamport and Timothy L. N. Lim, Uncovering the Pearl: The Hidden Story of Christianity in Asia (Eugene, OR: Cascade Books, 2023) ISBN 978-1-6667-2899-6

=== Articles ===
- "Many Tongues, Many Senses: Pentecost, the Body Politic, and the Redemption of Dis/ability.” Pneuma 31, 2 (2009): 167-188.
- (with Dale M. Coulter) "From West to East: The Renewal of the Leading Journal in Pentecostal Studies.” Pneuma 10, 2 (2011): 147-173.
- "Sons and Daughters, Young and Old: Toward a Pentecostal Theology of the Family.” PentecoStudies 10, 2 (2011): 147-173.
- "Science and Religion: Introducing the Issues, Entering the Debates--A Review Essay.” Christian Scholar's Review 40, 2 (Winter 2011): 189-203.
- "Reading Scripture and Nature: Pentecostal Hermeneutics and Their Implications for the Contemporary Evangelical Theology and Science Conversation.” Perspectives on Science and Christian Faith 63, 1 (March 2011): 3-15.
- "Disability and the Love of Wisdom: De-Forming, Re-Forming, and Per-Forming Philosophy of Religion.” Evangelical Review of Theology 35, 2 (April 2011): 160-176.
- "The Spirit of Science: Are Pentecostals Ready to Engage the Discussion?" Cyberjournal for Pentecostal-Charismatic Research (April 20, 2011).
- "Disability Theology of the Resurrection: Persisting Questions and Additional Considerations--A Response to Ryan Mullins.” Ars Disputandi 12 (2012).
- "Pentecostal Scholarship and Scholarship on Pentecostalism: The Next Generation.” Pneuma 34, 2 (2012): 161-165.
- "What's Love Got to Do With It?: The Sociology of Godly Love and the Renewal of Modern Pentecostalism.” Journal of Pentecostal Theology 21, 1 (2012): 113-134.
- "Informality, Illegality, and Improvisation: Theological Reflections on Money, Migration, and Ministry in Chinatown, NYC, and Beyond.” Journal of Race, Ethnicity, and Religion 3, 2 (January 2012).
- "Sanctification, Science, and the Spirit: Salvaging Holiness in the Late Modern World.” Wesleyan Theological Journal 47, 2 (Fall 2012): 36-52.

=== Chapters ===
- "The Buddhist-Christian Encounter in the United States: Reflections on Christian Practices." In Ecumenical Directions in the United States Today: Churches on a Theological Journey, eds. Antonios Kireopoulos and Juliana Mecera. New York: Paulist Press, 2011.
- "The Spirit, Vocation, and the Life of the Mind: A Pentecostal Testimony." In Pentecostals in the Academy: Testimonies of Call, eds. Steven M. Fettke and Robby Waddell. Cleveland: CPT Press, 2012.
- "Relational Theology and the Holy Spirit." In Relational Theology: A Contemporary Introduction, eds. Brint Montgomery, Thomas J. Oord, and Karen Strand Winslow. Eugene: Wipf & Stock, 2012.
- "Pentecostal and Charismatic Theology." In The Routledge Companion to Modern Christian Thought, eds. James Beilby and Chad Meister. New York: Routledge, 2013.
