= Becky Nordgren =

American politician (born 1961)

Revenue Commissioner of Etowah County, Alabama
- Incumbent
- Assumed office October 1, 2021
- Preceded by: Linda Barrett-Vaughan

Member of the Alabama House of Representatives from the 29th district
- In office November 3, 2010 – October 1, 2021
- Preceded by: Jack Page
- Succeeded by: Mark Gidley

Personal details
- Born: Karen Rebecca Nordgren; May 25, 1961 (age 65) Gadsden, Alabama
- Party: Republican

Karen Rebecca Nordgren (born May 25, 1961) is an American politician who served in the Alabama House of Representatives from the 29th district from 2010 to 2021. Nordgren resigned from the House on October 1, 2021, after being elected Etowah County's revenue commissioner.

== Biography ==
Nordgren co-owns a business named Clear Images-Advertising. She is a Christian.
