= Creator of the Universe =

2020 lyrical music by James F. Linzey

- Lyrics: James F. Linzey, 2020
- Music: James F. Linzey, 2020

"Creator of the Universe" is a prayer for the United States Space Force, composed in 2020 by Former United States Air Force Captain James F. Linzey.

== History ==
After the creation of the United States Space Force in December 2019, Linzey wrote a prayer petitioning God for safety for the Space Force Guardians on each flight into space.

In the meantime Linzey made a move to Kansas where he finishing writing the hymn. Linzey says he then reached out to churches across the country, hoping they would use it in services and that the hymn's acceptance gained momentum. The Baptist Press published a headline article on the hymn, which assisted in this matter.

Creator of the Universe came to him while studying koine Greek at the California campus of Westminster Theological Seminary in the City of Escondido where he resided. "I was thinking about the awe and wonder of God. The words just flowed," Linzey said.

The February 29, 2020, edition of the Coffeyville Journal gives more details on how the hymn, Creator of the Universe, was written:

On February 12, 2020, Rev. James F. Linzey, who served as a highly decorated Air Force Captain, felt led by Almighty God to write the Space Force Hymn. He set his pen to paper the next day. He had been working on the hymn on an old upright piano that was out of tune in the former Dalton Museum building in Coffeyville, Kansas, which he was cleaning. On February 22, 2020, he completed the hymn, creating what many believe to be his lasting legacy for the Department of the Air Force, for which he served for 12 years. Coffeyville proudly serves as "Home of the United States Space Force Hymn, Creator of the Universe."

The Baptist Press stated that Creator of the Universe joins other hymns often associated with various branches of the U.S. military: Air Force: Lord, Guard and Guide the Men who Fly; Army: Eternal Father, Hear our Prayer; Coast Guard: Ruler of the Land and Sea; Navy: Eternal Father, Strong to Save; Marine Corps: Serving for Thee."

== Lyrics ==
The first and last verses of Creator of the Universe are as follows:

"Creator of the universe,
Watch over those who fly,
Through the great space beyond the earth,
And worlds beyond the sky . . .

"Eternal Father, strong to save,
In prayer before Thy light;
In solitude of sovereign grace,
Grant courage for each flight. Amen."

== Critical reviews ==
Jenny Rose Curtis reported, "Freedom From Religion Foundation (FFRF) urges the U.S. Department of Defense to get rid of the hymn Creator of the Universe because of its faith-based lyrics," but goes on to state that the FFRF was refuted by the Alliance Defending Freedom.

Retired Navy Commander Don Biadog, who is a former Command Chaplain of MCAS Miramar, commented in a K-Love radio article on June 13, 2024, "Due to the creation of the United States Space Force Hymn, Creator of the Universe, many are thrilled about performing this new addition to their 'arsenal' of music." The Baptist Press stated that the stately hymn in 2-2 time is a prayer for the safety and courage of Space Force crews."

An active duty Navy Petty Officer, DC1 Heber Lima, who is also an ordained Southern Baptist Convention pastor, commented, "The Space Force Hymn is an inspirational hymn which motivates me to worship the Creator of the universe, and is useful in any church service as a standard hymn;" and former Air Force Sergeant Jonathan Sciano added, "I like Creator of the Universe.
