= Full Gospel Business Men's Fellowship International =

Interdenominational Christian business organization

Full Gospel Business Men's Fellowship International (FGBMFI)
- Founded: 1951
- Founder: Demos Shakarian
- Type: Christian Interdenominational
- Location: Irvine, California, US
- Region served: 85 countries
- President: Francis Owusu
- Website: fgbmfi.org

The Full Gospel Business Men's Fellowship International (FGBMFI) is a fellowship of lay businessmen. Its main purpose is to bring interest to the Christian gospel. Theologically, the organization has its roots in Pentecostalism. The headquarters is in Irvine, California.

== History ==
FGBMFI was founded in 1952 in Los Angeles by Demos Shakarian, a California rancher. The expression "Full Gospel" in the name of the association is central to the vision of the organization. Following a difficult start (for a year nothing happened to the original group that met weekly), then a donation of $1,000 was given to start a small publication titled Full Gospel Business Men's VOICE, it grew steadily, the second chapter was in Sioux Falls, South Dakota, and after a few years chapters were set up throughout the world. In 1972, the membership was 300,000. In 1988, there were 3,000 chapters in 90 countries.

After Demos Shakarian died in 1993, his son Richard Shakarian assumed the organization's leadership.

In 2023, Francis Owusu was elected president of the organization.

The organization was present in 85 countries in 2023.

== Controversies ==
In the 1980s, the presence on the board of directors and the financial management of Demos Shakarian were challenged.

== See also ==
- Gideons International

== Literature ==
- Demos Shakarian, John & Elisabeth Sherrill: The Happiest People on Earth. Old Tappan, N.J.: Chosen Books: distributed by F. H. Revell Co., c1975. ISBN 0-912376-14-7. 187 pages.
- Val Fotherby: The awakening giant. London (UK) (Marshall Pickering), 2000. ISBN 0-551-03234-0. 200 pages.

== Bibliography ==
- "FGBMFI: Facing Frustrations and the Future", by B. Bird. Charisma (June 1986)
- "FGBMFI Struggles toward the Future", by D. Shakarian(?). Charisma (March 1988)
- All Things Are Possible, by D. E. Harrell Jr., 1975
- How to live like a King's Kid, by H. Hill. Logos International, 1974. ISBN 0-88270-083-9.
- "Full Gospel Business Men's Fellowship International" by J. R. Zeigler; pp. 653–54 in The New International Dictionary of Pentecostal and Charismatic Movements, revised and expanded edition, ed. Stanley M. Burgess, associate editor Eduard M. Van der Maas. (Grand Rapids, Michigan: Zondervan, 2002)
