= H. Vinson Synan =

American historian (1934–2020)

Harold Vinson Synan (December 1, 1934 – March 15, 2020) was an American historian, author, and alliance leader within the Pentecostal movement. Synan published a total of 25 books, a majority related to Holiness, Pentecostal, and Charismatic movements. He served as General Secretary of the International Pentecostal Holiness Church and later as Chair of the North American Renewal Service Committee from 1985 to 2001. From 1994 - 2006 he served as Dean of the School of Divinity at Regent University in Virginia Beach, Virginia. In 2016, Synan moved back to Tulsa, Oklahoma, to re-join the faculty of Oral Roberts University as Interim Dean of the College of Theology and Ministry, where he served for two years. Following that he served as Scholar in Residence at Oral Roberts University where he worked closely with William M. Wilson, the president of ORU, the World Pentecostal Fellowship, and Empowered21.

== Biography ==
Synan, along with his twin brother Vernon, was born on December 1, 1934, in Hopewell, Virginia, to Joseph Alexander and Minnis (Purdue) Synan. He was one of seven siblings.

=== Education and career ===
His father, a sixteen-year-old Methodist was converted at a Pentecostal Holiness tent meeting near Fredericksburg, Virginia. He later planted five Pentecostal Holiness congregations in the Tidewater area of Virginia before serving as a bishop of the Pentecostal Holiness Church, a position he held for 24 years. Synan's formative years revolved around his Pentecostal Holiness church. His call to ministry came shortly after his conversion in 1951, while living in Memphis, Tennessee, during the time he was seeking his experience of the "second blessing" of entire sanctification. Nine months later, at the age of seventeen, he received the baptism in the Holy Spirit. He began his preaching ministry the same year, and in 1954 was ordained in the Pentecostal Holiness Church.

Synan then completed a two-year liberal arts degree from Emmanuel College in Franklin Springs, Georgia. In 1955 and after a one-year pastoral apprenticeship, he became an evangelist in the Eastern Virginia PHC Conference. Synan graduated from the University of Richmond with a BA in American history in 1958, and in the fall of the same year began his teaching career.

From 1956 to 1962, he helped plant three churches in Virginia and from 1967 to 1974 he planted one in Georgia. From 1963 to 1975, he also taught history at his alma mater, Emmanuel College.

As Synan was making preparation for his academic career, Oral Roberts, a friend of the family, offered him a full scholarship to earn a PhD in theology at Harvard, Yale, or Princeton if he would return and teach at Oral Roberts University. Synan, however, declined the offer since he had already received a full scholarship with a stipend from the State of Georgia to prepare for his calling as a historian. In 1965, he completed his MA and in 1967 his PhD from the University of Georgia in American Social and Intellectual History.

In order to prepare his dissertation for publication, Synan spent the summer of 1968 reading through major Pentecostal journals. His travels took him to the Church of God (Cleveland, Tennessee) where he met with several leaders. Significant among them was Horace Ward who was serving as the dean of students at Lee University. Together they discussed the possibility of a future colloquium where Pentecostal scholars could share ideas. He later met with William Menzies while reviewing the Assemblies of God archives in Springfield, MO. Following a similar conversation regarding the organization of Pentecostal scholars, Ward, Menzies, and Synan proposed their idea at the Pentecostal World Conference held in Dallas, Texas, in 1970. The outcome was the birth of the Society for Pentecostal Studies. Synan was elected as the first General Secretary and served as the editor of their newsletters for several years.

From 1973 to 1977, Synan served as the General Secretary for the Pentecostal Holiness Church while also teaching at Oklahoma City Southwestern College and served as the acting president in 1980. He was elected as Assistant General Superintendent of his denomination in 1977 and served until 1981 when he became the Director of Evangelism, a position which he held for the next four years.

In 1977, Synan was the chairman of the Pentecostal track for the General Conference on Charismatic Renewal held in Arrow Head Stadium in Kansas City. This event packed the stadium with 50,000 charismatic worshipers and attracted attention from around the world. It also opened up many doors of ministry for Synan and he became a frequently invited guest on such television programs as The PTL Club, Trinity Broadcasting Network, and The 700 Club to discuss the Renewal that was occurring among Catholics and the exploding growth of Pentecostalism around the world.

During the years of 1990 and 1994, Synan was a professor of Pentecostal and Charismatic History and served as the Director of the Holy Spirit Research Center at Oral Roberts University in Tulsa, Oklahoma. For twelve years, from 1994 to 2006, he served as the Dean of the Regent University School of Divinity. Under his leadership the School of Divinity implemented both a Doctorate of Ministry and a non-residential and on-line PhD program in Renewal Studies, which was the first of its kind in the world. In 2006, Synan stepped down as Dean to serve part-time as Professor of Pentecostal and Charismatic History and Dean Emeritus of Regent University.

In 2016, Synan moved back to Oklahoma to re-join the faculty at Oral Roberts University as a Scholar in Residence at Oral Roberts University where he worked closely with William M. Wilson, the president of ORU and global co-chair of Empowered21.

=== Personal life ===
On August 13, 1960, he married Carol Lee Fuqua from Richmond, Virginia. Reflecting on the day he met her as a young evangelist preaching at a summer youth camp, he described her as "a dark-haired beauty whose smile seemed to light up the entire room." Together they had four children: Mary Carol (1961), Virginia Lee (1963), Harold Vinson Jr. (1966), and Joseph Alexander III (1968). Synan died March 15, 2020.

== Writing ==
In 1963, Synan began his teaching career in history at Emmanuel College. It was at this time the school also asked him to write the school's official history. Synan had known G. F. Taylor, the widow of the founder of the college, when he was a student in the 1950s, and since he was a faculty member, research of the school's history was readily accessible. In 1969, the school published his research as a fundraiser for the school's 50th anniversary under the title Emmanuel College: The First Fifty Years.

Synan's entire life was shaped by his involvement in the Pentecostal Holiness Church. His father became a preacher twelve years before Synan was born, served in several pastorates during Synan's early years and later served as chairman, presiding bishop and general superintendent of the church. His father was also one of the founding fathers of the National Association of Evangelicals in 1943. As a son of the denomination and a professionally trained historian, Synan was commissioned to write the official history of his PHC. The Old Time Power was published in 1973, the same year Synan assumed the position as General Secretary for his denomination. Two revisions of the book were published in 1986 and 1998 respectively.

In 1972 Synan was invited by Kilian McDonnell to speak at the third annual Catholic Charismatic Conference at University of Notre Dame. This was a life changing experience that marked the beginning of many years of leadership in the ecumenical movement. Because of Synan's involvement in the Charismatic movement, in 1974 he wrote Charismatic Bridges which is an overview of the history of the Pentecostal movement and served as an introduction to those outside the Pentecostal tradition.

The Holiness-Pentecostal Movement in the United States published by Eerdsmans in 1971 was a result of Synan's PhD dissertation. It was later revised and published under the title Holiness-Pentecostal Tradition in 1997. His central thesis was that Pentecostalism was rooted in the Holiness movement in the late 19th century. While this is a commonly held belief by many Pentecostal historians today, it was a fresh concept at that time. Prior to publishing his monograph, Synan added three chapters beyond his dissertation to include the Catholic Charismatic Movement which was at this time in full swing. Synan was concerned that including the Catholic's in his book would jeopardize his standing in the Pentecostal world since his position validated the Catholic Renewal as a genuinely Pentecostal experience. To his surprise, more Catholics purchased the book than any other group as they attempted to discover the history behind their charismatic experience. Copies were sent to the Vatican and all over Europe, and as a result, Synan became a frequent speaker at Catholic Charismatic events and was invited to participate in the Catholic-Pentecostal dialogue with David du Plessis and Kilian McDonnell. After thirty-seven years The Holiness-Pentecostal Tradition, revised in 1997 under its present title, is still a popular text.

Synan's book Aspects of Pentecostal-Charismatic Origins which he edited in 1975 is a compilation of articles presented at the Society for Pentecostal Studies in 1973. The book offers a variety of themes related to the history of the Pentecostal-Charismatic movement.

While serving as the Director of Evangelism for the Pentecostal Holiness Church, he published his seventh book In the Latter Days: The Outpouring of the Holy Spirit in the Twentieth Century in 1984. Originally written in 1974 as a series of lectures presented for the King Memorial Lectureship at Emmanuel College, Synan used the motif first described by David Wesley Myland in his book The Latter Rain Covenant and Pentecostal Power in which the Pentecostal outpouring around the start of the 20th century was recognized as the fulfillment of the Joel 2 prophecy for early and latter rain. In this book, Synan depicts the antecedents of the Pentecostal outpouring of the 20th century as the "Gathering Clouds." The chapter on the early history with Charles Parham and the Azusa Street Revival the author titles "The Rain Falls in America." The chapter "The Rain Falls Around the World" is a description of the movement's growth into Europe, Chile, Latin America, Russia, and Brazil. The two chapters "The Rain Rejected" and "The Rain Reconsidered" discusses the troubled years when Pentecostalism came under harsh criticism and then with the rise of the healing Evangelists and the Charismatic movement which began with Dennis Bennett, a more positive attitude evolved. The history of the Catholic Charismatic Renewal and the Jesus People was described as "Rain Fall" and "Cloudburst." The book closed with the three streams of Renewal coming together into one "River". He gives this opening statement in the book: "There is only one outpouring of the Holy Spirit in the latter days, although the streams flow through channels known as 'classical Pentecostalism,' Protestant 'neo-Pentecostalism,' and the 'Catholic charismatic renewal.' In the end, it adds up to one great historical phenomenon which has had a profound effect on Christianity around the world." According to Synan, In the Latter Days has been published in more languages than any of his other books.

In 1985, Synan was the founder and chairman of the North American Renewal Service Committee which resulted in the New Orleans Leaders Conference that hosted over 7,500 leaders from Pentecostal denominations and mainline churches involved in the renewal movement. In 1987, 40,000 people attended the following General Congress hosted in the New Orleans Superdome. In preparation for the conference, Synan had the opportunity to interview many of the pioneer leaders of the various charismatic renewal groups and obtain a firsthand account of their story. These conversations led him to realize there was "a great deal that remain[ed] to be told about this movement." The results of his findings were published in 1987 under the title The Twentieth-Century Pentecostal Explosion: The Exciting Growth of Pentecostal Churches and Charismatic Renewal Movements.

While serving as the Director of the Holy Spirit Research Center and Professor of Pentecostal and Charismatic History at Oral Roberts University, Synan co-authored with Ralph Rath his ninth book titled Launching the Decade of Evangelization in 1990. It was during this same year he chaired the Holy Spirit Congress in Indianapolis where 25,000 gathered in the Hoosier Dome. Part three of Launching the Decade of Evangelism provided a historical background of the events which led up to the Indianapolis Renewal gathering. After this, there were two more Congresses on the Holy Spirit and World Evangelism—one in Orlando in 1995 and one in St. Louis in 2000.

At the Indianapolis Congress in 1990, Demos Shakarian commissioned Synan to write Under His Banner to celebrate the 40th anniversary of the Full Gospel Business Men's Fellowship International which began in 1951. By the time this book was published in 1992, this ecumenical forerunner movement had grown to over 3,000 chapters in 117 nations.

His book, The Spirit Said "Grow" was the fourth in a series of books published by MARC Innovations on mission. The material for this book was originally presented as a series of lectures on "Evangelization and the Charismatic Renewal" in 1990 at the Church Growth Lectureship at the School of World Mission, Fuller Theological Seminary under the leadership of C. Peter Wagner. In this sixty-two page book, Synan cites David Barrett's statistics to provide a historical sketch of the explosive growth of Pentecostal-Charismatic Renewal around the world, employing the "Third Wave" analogy first expressed by Wagner in 1983.

In a book review by Henry Lederle, Synan's book The Century of the Holy Spirit: 100 Years of Pentecostal and Charismatic Renewal was described as "a lasting contribution to the recording of Pentecostalism," and a book that is "poised to become the standard work of reference for the historical development of the various Pentecostal and Charismatic awakenings of the twentieth century." This book, which Lederle calls Synan's "magnum opus," contains 15 chapters, seven of which were written by Synan and the remaining eight chapters by contributing authors. While the primary focus of the book is the 21st century, it also provides a brief history of the Wesleyan Holiness antecedents which begin in the early 18th century.

Written at the invitation of Bert Ghezzi, a Catholic Charismatic and editor of Servant Publications, Voices of Pentecost: Testimonies of Lives Touched by the Holy Spirit is a devotional book, presenting short personal testimonies of 61 individuals throughout history, especially Pentecostals and Charismatics who, as the title suggests, have been touched and transformed by the power of the Holy Spirit.

In 2003, Synan, along with three of his family members, produced The Synans of Virginia: The Story of an Irish Family in America. This two hundred forty-four page book traces the Synan bloodline back through William Synan, the Immigrant, from County Cork in southern Ireland to Virginia.

Synan's 2007 publication, A Seminary to Change the World Regent University School of Divinity at 25 Years was written in honor of the 25th Anniversary of the Regent University School of Divinity. Filled with pictures, this text provides the history of a school, founded by M. G. 'Pat' Robertson, which began with 23 students on September 8, 1982, as CBN University School of Biblical Studies and has grown to become a fully accredited university recognized around the world.

Throughout 2019, Synan worked on the history of the contemporary Spirit-Empowered movement, represented by Empowered21, for the Jerusalem 2020 Congress.

== Bibliography ==
Bartleman, Frank. Azusa Street: An Eyewitness Account, ed. Vinson Synan. Gainesville, FL: Bridge-Logos, 1980.

Synan, Vinson. Emmanuel College: The First Fifty Years 1919-1969. Franklin Springs, GA: North Washington Press, 1968.

Synan, Vinson. The Holiness-Pentecostal Movement in the United States. Grand Rapids, MI: Wm. B. Eerdmans, 1971.

Synan, Vinson. The Old Time Power: A History of the Pentecostal Holiness Church. Franklin Springs, GA: Advocate Press, 1973.

Synan, Vinson. Charismatic Bridges. Ann Arbor, MI: Word of Life, 1974.

Synan, Vinson. ed., Aspects of Pentecostal-Charismatic Origins. Plainfield, NJ: Logos International, 1975.

Synan, Vinson. In the Latter Days: The Outpouring of the Holy Spirit in the Twentieth Century. Ann Arbor, MI: Servant Books, 1984.

Synan, Vinson. Voices of Pentecost: Testimonies of Lives Touched by the Holy Spirit. Ann Arbor, MI: Servant Publications, 2003.

Synan, Vinson. The Twentieth-Century Pentecostal Explosion. Altamonte Springs, FL: Creation House, 1987.

Synan Vinson and Ralph Rath, Launching the Decade of Evangelization. South Bend, IN: North American Renewal Services Committee, 1990.

Synan, Vinson. Under His Banner: History of Full Gospel Business Men's Fellowship International. Costa Mesa, CA: Gift Publications, 1992.

Synan, Vinson. The Spirit Said 'Grow', Series editor Bryant L Myers. Monrovia, CA: MARC, 1992.

Synan, Vinson. The Holiness-Pentecostal Tradition. Grand Rapids, MI: Wm B. Eerdmans, 1997.

Synan, Vinson. The Century of the Holy Spirit: 100 Years of Pentecostal and Charismatic Renewal. Nashville, TN: Thomas Nelson, 2001.

Synan, Vinson. Voices of Pentecost: Testimonies of Lives Touched by the Holy Spirit. Ann Arbor, MI: Servant Publications, 2003.

Synan, Vinson. The Synans of Virginia: The Story of an Irish Family in America. United States: Xulon Press, 2003.

Synan, Vinson. A Seminary to Change the World: 25th Anniversary History, Virginia Beach: Regent University, 2007.

Synan, Vinson. An Eyewitness Remembers the Century of the Holy Spirit, Grand Rapids, MI: Chosen Books, 2010.

Synan, Vinson. Spirit-Empowered Christianity in the 21st Century, Lake Mary, FL: Charisma House, 2011.

Synan, Vinson. Where He Leads Me: The Vinson Synan Story, Franklin Springs, GA: LifeSprings Resources, 2019.

Synan, Vinson & Wilson, William. As the Waters Cover the Sea: The story of Empowered21 and the movement it serves, Tulsa, OK: ORU Press, 2020.
