= Mark Gidley =

American politician

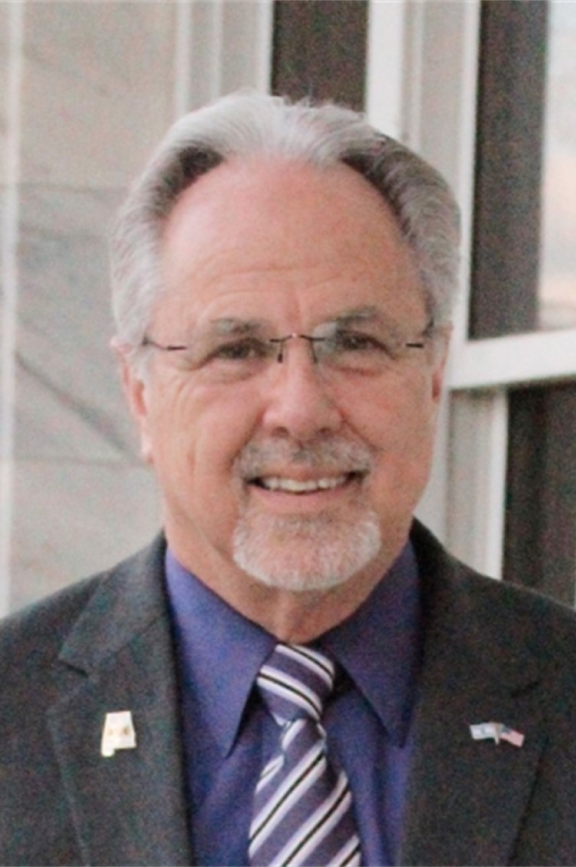

Member of the Alabama House of Representatives from the 29th district
- Incumbent
- Assumed office November 9, 2022
- Preceded by: Becky Nordgren

Personal details
- Party: Republican
- Spouse: Kathy Gidley née Chapman
- Children: 2
- Education: Pentecostal Theological Seminary (MA)
- Profession: Pastor

Mark Gidley is an American politician who has served as a Republican member of the Alabama House of Representatives since November 8, 2022. He represents Alabama's 29th House district.

== Electoral history ==
Gidley was elected on November 8, 2022, in the 2022 Alabama House of Representatives election against Libertarian opponent Clifford Valentin. He assumed office the next day on November 9, 2022.

== Biography ==
Gidley graduated from Hokes Bluff High School and holds a master's degree in theology from the Pentecostal Theological Seminary. He married Kathy Gidley née Chapman, and they have two daughters and four grandchildren.

Alabama House of Representatives
Preceded by Becky Nordgren	Member of the Alabama House of Representatives; 2022–present	Succeeded by incumbent
