= J. Rodman Williams =

American theologian and academic (1918–2008)

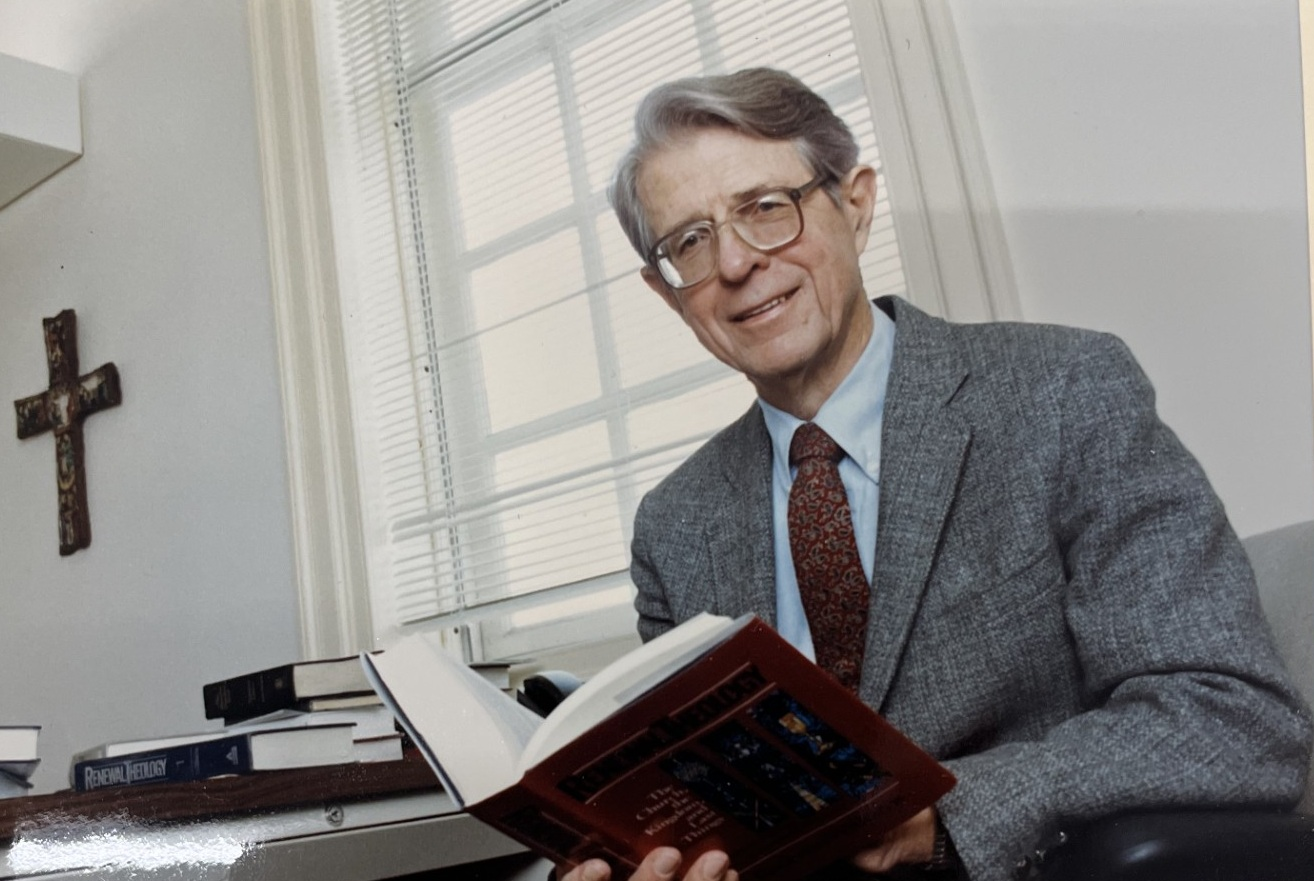
- J. Rodman Williams in his office at Regent University
- Born: August 21, 1918; Clyde, North Carolina
- Died: October 18, 2008 (aged 90); Virginia Beach, Virginia
- Citizenship: United States
- Education: Davidson College (A.B.) Union Theological Seminary in Virginia (B.D. and Th. M. degrees) Columbia University (Ph.D. degree in Philosophy of Religion and Ethics)
- Occupations: Minister, Chaplain, Theologian, Professor
- Years active: 1943-2000
- Known for: Renewal theology, Charismatic movement
- Spouse: Lela Jo Williams (m. August 6, 1949)
- Children: 3
- Website: https://www.renewaltheology.net/

J. Rodman Williams (August 21, 1918 – October 18, 2008) was a Presbyterian charismatic theologian and professor of renewal theology at Regent University in Virginia Beach, Virginia. He is widely regarded as the father of modern renewal theology.

== Early life and education ==
Born on August 21, 1918, in Clyde, North Carolina, Williams earned an AB (1939) from Davidson College, a B.D. (1943) and Th.M. (1944) from Union Theological Seminary in Virginia. In 1943, he received a commission into the U.S Navy Chaplain Corps. From 1944 to 1946, he served as chaplain to the Marine Corps First Division, including during the Battle of Okinawa. Following his military service, he earned a Ph.D. in the philosophy of religion and ethics in 1954 at Columbia University and Union Theological Seminary in Richmond, VA.

== Career ==
Williams was ordained in the Presbyterian Church in the United States in 1943 and served as a pastor for several years before becoming a full-time educator.

From 1959-1972, he served as professor of systematic theology at Austin Presbyterian Theological Seminary. As a key figure in the burgeoning charismatic movement of the 1960s, he was president of the International Presbyterian Charismatic Communion, and later a participant in the International Roman Catholic–Pentecostal Dialogue. In 1972, he became the founding president of the Melodyland School of Theology in Anaheim, California, and in 1985 he served as president of the Society for Pentecostal Studies. In 1982, he joined the faculty of Regent University, where he taught for eighteen years. Upon his retirement in 2000, Regent University established in his honor an endowed chair in Renewal Theology.

Important works include the three-volume systematic theology entitled Renewal Theology (1988–1992, published as a single volume in 1996). This monumental work was the first complete systematic theology written from a Charismatic perspective. It included chapters on the supernatural gifts of the Spirit and a chapter on the Baptism of the Holy Spirit, arguing for the traditional Pentecostal interpretation. He also argued for the Arminian view of the possibility of apostasy.

Williams was a strong defender of speaking in tongues, writing in 1978, "When a person is baptized in the Holy Spirit, speaking in tongues is a normal occurrence; normal, yet super-natural and belonging to the realm of signs and wonders...Since this prayer language comes from the Holy Spirit, it is a pure and holy language, regardless of the speaker's imperfection. It is, in my estimation, the noblest language this side of heaven."

== Published books ==
- Contemporary Existentialism and Christian Faith (Englewood Cliffs, NJ: Prentice-Hall, 1965).
- The Era of the Spirit (Plainfield, NJ: Logos, 1971). ISBN 9780912106854
- The Pentecostal Reality (Plainfield, NJ: Logos, 1972). ISBN 9780882700168
- Ten Teachings (Carol Stream, IL: Creation House, 1974).
- The Gift of the Holy Spirit Today (Plainfield, NJ: Logos, 1980).
- Renewal Theology [three volumes in one] (Grand Rapids: Zondervan, 1996)
- God, the World, and Redemption (Grand Rapids: Zondervan, 1988). Renewal Theology
- Salvation, the Holy Spirit, and Christian Living (Grand Rapids: Zondervan, 1990). Renewal Theology
- The Church, The Kingdom, and Last Things (Grand Rapids: Zondervan, 1992).
