= Pentecostal Theological Seminary, Cleveland =

Pentecostal Theological Seminary
- Motto: "Your Ministry is Our Mission"
- Type: Private, Theological Seminary
- Established: 1975
- Affiliations: Church of God
- President: Michael L. Baker
- Academic staff: 17
- Students: 565 (Fall 2022)
- Location: Cleveland, Tennessee, United States; 35.1626°N 84.8685°W
- Campus: Suburban
Colors
- Website: ptseminary.edu

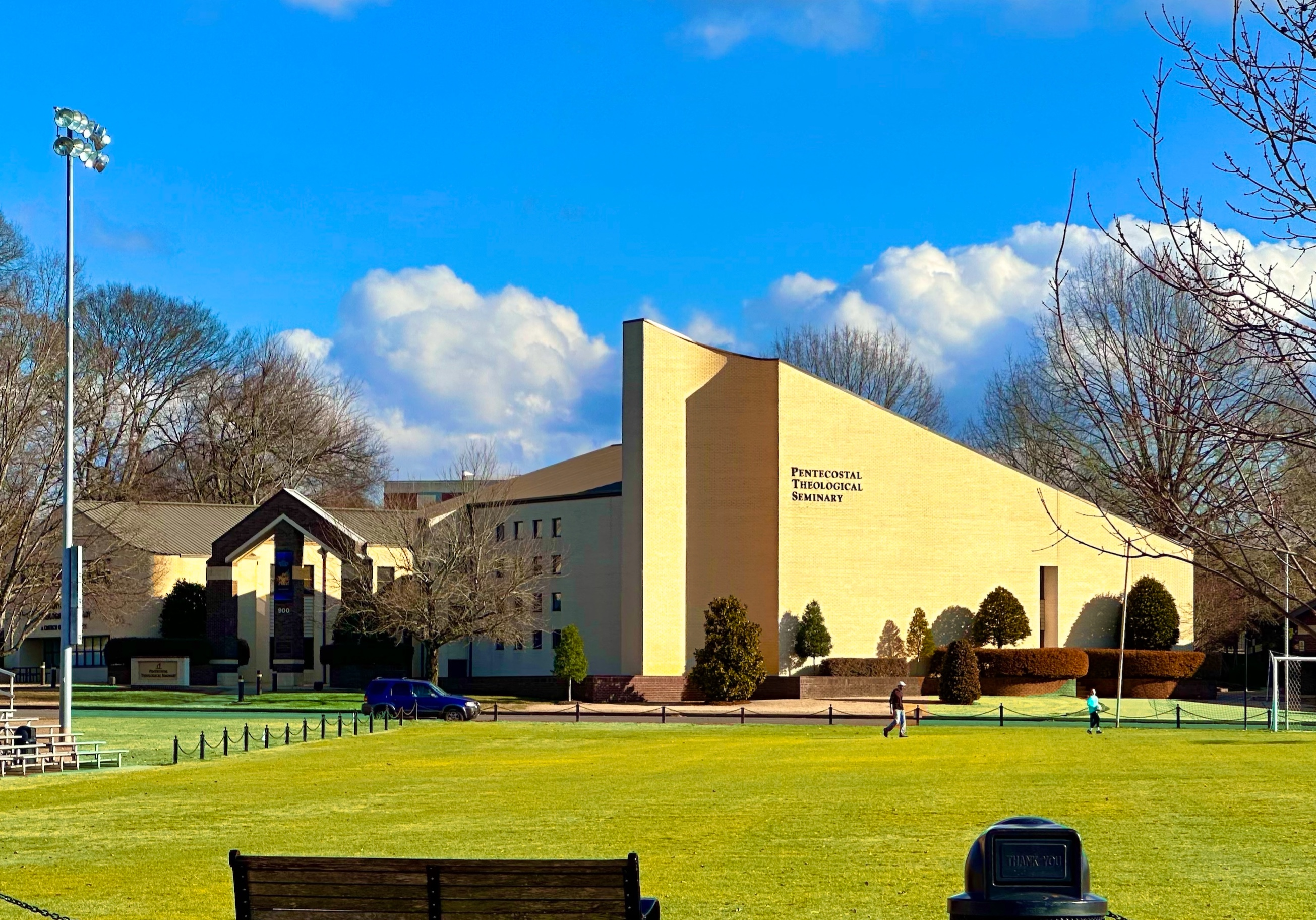
Pentecostal Theological Seminary in Cleveland, Tennessee, on Jan. 1, 2023

The Pentecostal Theological Seminary is a private Christian seminary in Cleveland, Tennessee, United States. While part of the educational ministry of the Church of God, the school accepts students of other denominations, particularly those interested in its emphasis on Wesleyan/Holiness theology and Pentecostal spirituality. It has trained ministers since 1975.

The school offers the M.Div, M.T.S., and M.A, degrees with concentrations in Church Ministries, Discipleship and Christian Formation, Theological studies and Counseling. Some courses and degrees are offered online. It also offers the D.Min. degree for ministerial leaders seeking to expand their study.

== History ==
Interest in a denomination seminary began in the 1960s and Charles W. Conn instituted a denominational Board of Education in 1968. This board appointed a committee (H.D. Williams, James M. Beaty, and R. Hollis Gause) to look at the possibility of such a seminary. During the early 1970s the denomination decided to pursue a graduate school for ministerial training and work began to launch such a school. The seminary was granted a charter for graduate education by the state of Tennessee in 1975 as the Church of God Graduate School of Christian Ministries.

When it opened in the fall of 1975, the school offered two degrees: the Master of Science in Religion and the Master of Arts in Religion. The offices and classrooms were in a renovated apartment building in Cleveland, Tennessee. It had two full-time faculty members, with one of those serving as Dean and Director. Opening with an enrollment of eighteen students, the graduate school increased to twenty-eight students the second term. At the first commencement on July 27, 1976, three students received the Master of Arts in Religion and two students received the Master of Science degree in Religion under the one-year curriculum. Eight more students graduated on July 26, 1977.

In 1979, the seminary Board of Directors authorized the purchase of property and the building of a new facility. Subsequently, property was acquired at the corner of 8th and Walker Streets near the Church of God Publishing House, North Cleveland Church of God and Lee University. On November 10, 1979, ground was broken for the erection of a facility to house the Seminary. In the fall of 1980, the Seminary moved into a new building constructed to house offices, classrooms, and a chapel. The Squires Library and Dixon Pentecostal Research Center would be shared by the seminary and Lee University. In the late 1980s, Hamilton Court was built as a dormitory for students.

In 1995, the addition of the Curtsinger Ministry Center doubled the size of the academic space. Today several small buildings and houses are also owned by the seminary to serve as housing for various students, ministries and departments, including the Centre for Pentecostal Theology.

=== Name ===
The seminary has changed names several times. It began in 1975 as the Church of God Graduate School of Christian Ministries. The name was changed to the Church of God School of Theology in 1978, and then became the Church of God Theological Seminary in 1997. These name changes were made to reflect the changing level of accreditation received by ATS and SACS. In 2004-2005 the name was changed again to Pentecostal Theological Seminary. This was done with the hope of attracting other Pentecostals.

=== Presidents ===
Until 1988, the president of the denominational seminary was the person elected as the General Overseer of the Church of God. Since 1988, the president has been appointed by the denomination but serves no other official position.

- Wade H. Horton 1975-1976
- Cecil B Knight 1976-1982
- Lewis J. Willis 1982-1984
- Ray H. Hughes Sr. 1984-1986
- Robert White 1986-1988
- J. Herbert Walker Jr. 1988-1988 (died during his tenure)
- Cecil B. Knight 1989-1998
- Donald Walker 1998-2002
- Steven J. Land 2002-2014
- R. Lamar Vest 2014–2016
- Michael Baker 2016–Present

=== Deans ===
- R. Hollis Gause, 1975-1980
- James Beaty, 1980-1992
- Steven J. Land, 1992-2002
- James P. Bowers, 2004-2011
- David S. Han, 2011–2026
- Lee Roy Martin, 2026-Present

== Centre for Pentecostal Theology ==
The Centre for Pentecostal Theology (CPT) is a residential library dedicated to facilitating the conception, birth, and maturation of constructive Pentecostal Theology across the theological disciplines. Several PhD students are currently working with the centre to produce academic work in the area of Pentecostal Theology under the supervision of John Christopher Thomas and Lee Roy Martin. Many of the students are working with Bangor University, Wales and the University of South Africa.

The Journal of Pentecostal Theology (JPT) was also birthed at the Pentecostal Theological Seminary. It is maintained by the CPT and published by Brill Publishers. The founding editors (Steven J. Land, John Christopher Thomas and Rickie D. Moore) were all faculty at the seminary.

== Notable faculty ==
The seminary has been a center of Pentecostal Theology led by scholars in the field.

- R. Hollis Gause - New Testament Theology, first dean of the seminary
- Cheryl Bridges Johns - Discipleship and Christian Formation
- Steven J. Land - Theology
- Rickie D. Moore - Old Testament
- John Christopher Thomas - New Testament

== Notable alumni ==
- Mark Gidley — member of the Alabama House of Representatives
