= Grant Wacker =

American historian of religion

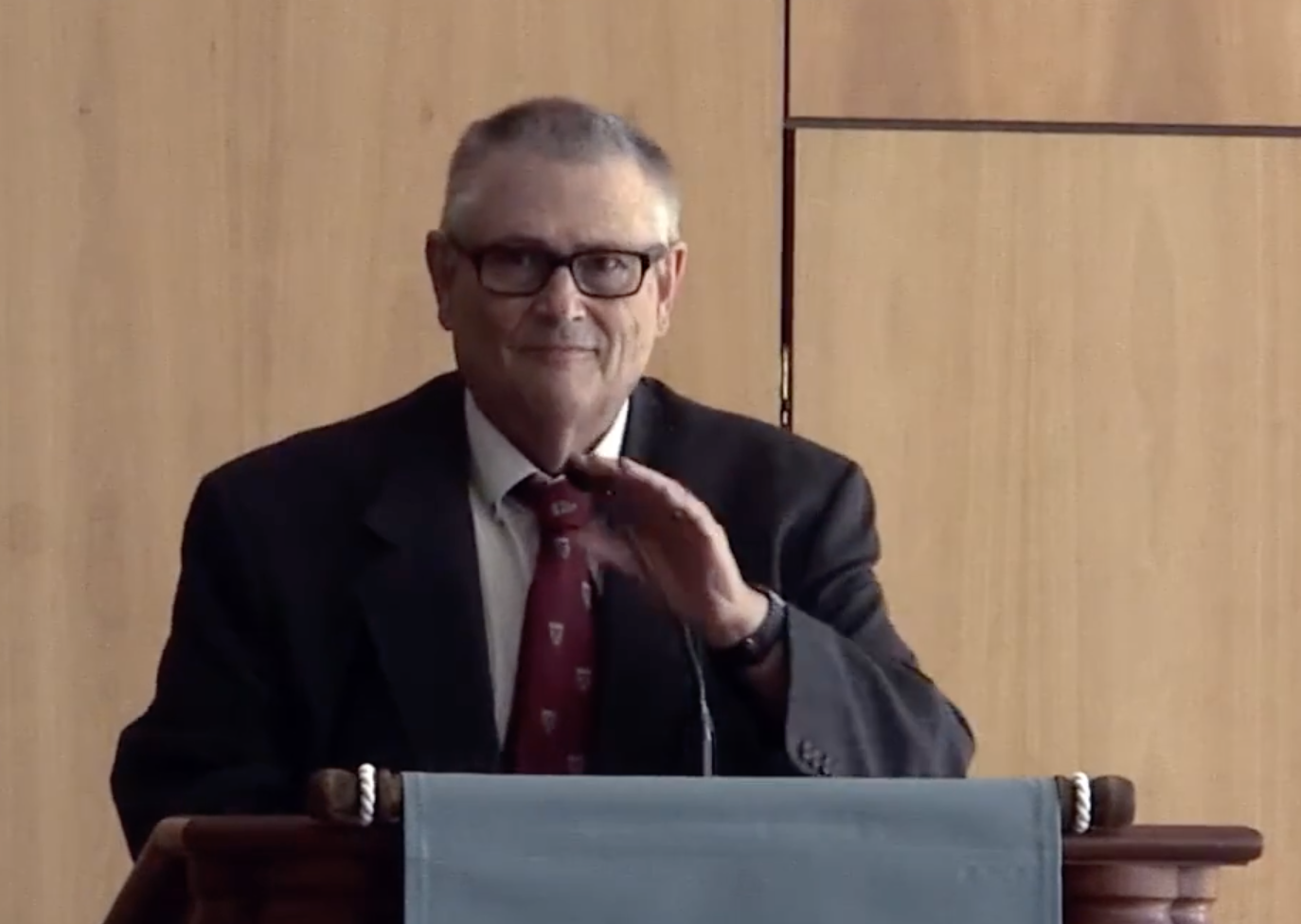
- Grant Wacker at the 2016 colloquium Mormonism in the Academy
- Born: Grant Albert Wacker; 1945 (age 80–81)
- Spouse: Katherine Wacker

Academic background
- Education: Stanford University; Harvard University
- Thesis: Augustus H. Strong (1978)

Academic work
- Discipline: History; religious studies
- Sub-discipline: History of Christianity in the United States
- Institutions: University of North Carolina at Chapel Hill; Duke University

Grant Albert Wacker (born 1945) is an American historian of Christianity in the United States.

== Education ==
Wacker is a graduate of Stanford University (BA, philosophy, 1972) and of Harvard University (PhD, religion, 1978).

== Career ==
Grant Wacker is the Gilbert T. Rowe Distinguished Professor Emeritus of Christian History at Duke Divinity School. He taught in the Department of Religious Studies at the University of North Carolina at Chapel Hill from 1977 to 1992. In 1992 he joined the faculty of Duke Divinity School, where he taught until he partly retired in 2015 and fully retired in 2018. A specialist in American Christian history, Wacker is the author or co-editor of nine books, including Heaven Below: Early Pentecostals and American Culture (Harvard University Press, 2001), America's Pastor: Billy Graham and the Shaping of a Nation (Harvard University Press, 2014), One Soul at a Time: The Story of Billy Graham (Eerdmans, 2019), and more than two-hundred published articles, essays, and book reviews. He is past president of the Society for Pentecostal Studies, past president of the American Society of Church History, a former senior editor of Church History: Studies in Christianity and Culture, and a senior trustee of Fuller Theological Seminary. He is an advisory editor of The Christian Century and Religion and American Culture. Along with three teaching awards, he directed twenty-six doctoral students at UNC or Duke.

== Personal life ==
Wacker is an active lay member of First United Methodist Church in Cary, N.C., where he lives with his wife, Katherine Wacker.

Professional and academic associations
Preceded by John Van Engen	President of the American; Society of Church History; 2008–2009	Succeeded by Charles H. Lippy
