= Steven Jack Land =

American writer (born 1946)

Steven Jack Land (born September 23, 1946) is a Canadian renewal theologian within the Pentecostal movement who began serving as the president of the Church of God Theological Seminary, now Pentecostal Theological Seminary, in 2002. He is the first president of the institution to have been selected from the seminary faculty. In 2014, he transitioned away from the serving as the President.

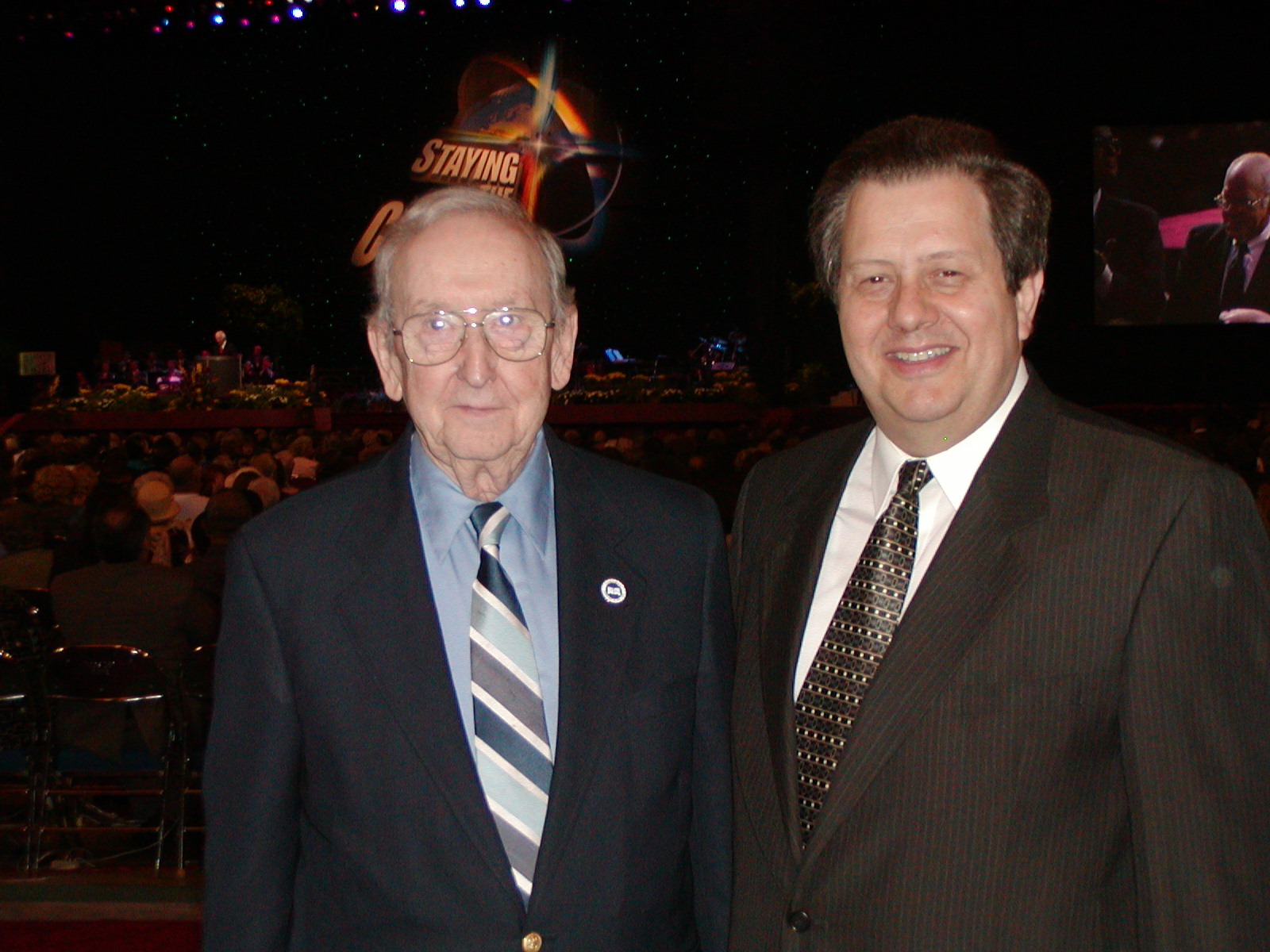
R Hollis Gause and Steven J Land at the Church of God General Assembly 2002

Land received the B. A. in psychology from Birmingham-Southern College in 1968, the M.Div. from Candler School of Theology in 1973 and a Ph.D. in theological studies (systematic theology) from Emory University in 1991.

Prior to his work in academics, he was engaged in urban missions (founder: Atlanta’s Mission Possible, Inc., 1970) and his role as a civil rights community organizer (1964–1968).

In the seminary, Land pioneered the courses on the Theology of Holiness, the Theology of Wesley, Divine Healing, Pentecostal Foundations for Theological Study and Ministry, Apologetics, and Pentecostal Spirituality-Theology. He is a founding editor of the international Journal of Pentecostal Theology.

Land has served as both vice president and president of the Society for Pentecostal Studies. He has also been a member of the Wesleyan Theological Society, Karl Barth Society and the American Academy of Religion (Evangelical Theology/Wesleyan studies section). He has been a participant in formal theological dialogues with Roman Catholics (internationally), Jews and mainline Protestants (National Council of Churches USA). He is a Staley Foundation Distinguished Lecturer and a distinguished visiting lecturer in leadership at Regent University’s Center for Leadership Studies and the School of Divinity’s Ph.D. in renewal theology and history.

Land's published works include Pentecostal Spirituality: A Passion for the Kingdom, Living Faith (a text on Pentecostal doctrines with Rufus Hollis Gause), Great Themes of Scripture, DO-TELL:Youth Evangelism, Reclaiming Your Testimony (with R. Lamar Vest).
