= Stanley M. Horton =

American theologian (1916–2014)

- Born: May 6, 1916; United States
- Died: July 12, 2014 (aged 98); United States
- Education: University of California Berkeley; Gordon-Conwell Theological Seminary; Harvard University; Central Baptist Theological Seminary.
- Occupation(s): Author, professor
- Theological work
- Language: English
- Tradition or movement: Pentecostal

Stanley Monroe Horton (May 6, 1916 – July 12, 2014), was an American Renewal theologian within the Pentecostal movement and the author of numerous books. He served as the senior editorial advisor for the Modern English Version Bible, and he was Distinguished Professor Emeritus of Bible and Theology at the Assemblies of God USA, Springfield, Missouri.

His degrees included Bachelor of Science from the University of California at Berkeley, an M. Div. from Gordon-Conwell Theological Seminary, an S.T.M. from Harvard University, and a Th.D. from Central Baptist Theological Seminary. He was an ordained minister in the Assemblies of God.

== Books ==
A prolific writer, Horton authored and co-authored numerous books:

- Systematic Theology a Pentecostal Perspective
- What the Bible Says About the Holy Spirit, 1976. Revised edition (2005), ISBN 978-0-88243-359-2
- Bible Doctrines: A Pentecostal Perspective (with William Menzies), 1993. Logion Press. ISBN 978-0-88243-318-9
- The Holy Spirit a Pentecostal Perspective by Anthony Palma (Stanley M. Horton General Editor)
- Elements of a Christian Worldview by Michael Palmer (Stanley M. Horton General Editor)
- Ministerial Ethics: A Guide for Spirit Filled Leaders by T. Burton Pierce (Stanley M. Horton General Editor)
- They Spoke from God: A Survey of the Old Testament by Willian Williams (Stanley M. Horton Th.D General Editor)
- Isaiah: A Logion Press Commentary (Foreword by Roger D. Cotton)
- The Book of Acts : The Wind of the Spirit
- Our Destiny: Biblical Teachings on the Last Things
- Tongues and Prophecy: How to Know When a Gift of Utterance is in Order
- Acts: A Logion Press Commentary
- Perspectives On Spirit Baptism: Five Views (with Ralph Del Colle, H. Ray Dunning, and Larry Hart)
- Missions in the Age of the Spirit by John V. York (Stanley M. Horton Th.d General Editor), 2000. Logion Press. ISBN 978-0-88243-464-3
- Psalm in Your Heart (with George Wood)
- A Commentary on I and II Corinthians
- The Ultimate Victory: An Exposition of the Book of Revelation
- Into All Truth: A Survey of the Course and Content of Divine Revelation
- Modern English Version Bible ( Stanley M. Horton Th.D Senior Editorial Advisor) (with James Linzey Chief Editor), 2014. Passio.
