= Sheffield Academic Press =

Academic imprint based in the United Kingdom

- Status: Defunct
- Founder: Philip R. Davies and David J. A. Clines
- Defunct: 2003
- Successor: T&T Clark
- Country of origin: United Kingdom
- Headquarters location: Sheffield
- Publication types: Books, academic journals

Sheffield Academic Press was an academic publishing company based at the University of Sheffield, known for publications in the fields of archaeology, history of early Christianity and Judaism, Biblical studies, Judaic studies, Oriental studies, and Religious studies. It was launched in the mid-1980s, co-founded by biblical scholars Philip R. Davies and David J. A. Clines. In 2003 it was merged into T&T Clark, an imprint of Continuum International Publishing Group. Its editorial staff included David Orton and Stanley E. Porter.

Sheffield Academic Press had at one time been the imprint of the Journal for the Study of the Old Testament, the Journal for the Study of the Historical Jesus, the Journal for the Study of the Pseudepigrapha, the Journal of Mediterranean Archaeology, and the Journal of Pentecostal Theology. It was also the imprint for a series of studies on urban legend, under the title Perspectives on Contemporary Legend.

In 2004, a new imprint, Sheffield Phoenix Press, co-founded by David J. A. Clines, was established.
