= William A. Beardslee =

American theologian (1916–2001)

William A. Beardslee (March 25, 1916 – January 25, 2001) was a professional theologian who made major contributions to the New Revised Standard Version of the Bible. As a member of the National Council of Churches, Professor Beardslee spent 16 years helping translate ancient texts to update the Bible. The groups work resulted in the New Revised Standard Version, published in 1990, which replaced the 1952 Revised Standard Version. He was professor of religion at Emory University until his retirement in 1984. After his retirement, he spent his last 16 years as a voluntary director of the Process and Faith Program at the Claremont School of Theology.

Beardslee was a Charter Fellow of the Westar Institute, and participant in the Jesus Seminar. He was also a member of Progressive Christians Uniting, a southern California think tank addressing both social issues and theological issues. He served on the group's Reflection Committee which in 2003 produced the book Progressive Christians Speak: A Different Voice on Faith and Politics.

Beardslee's doctoral students included Pentecostal theologian R. Hollis Gause.

== Works ==
- Reading the Bible: A Guide (1964) co-authored with E. H. Rece
- America and the Future of Theology (1967)
- A House for Hope : a study in process and biblical thought (1975)
- Orientation by Disorientation: Studies in Literary Criticism and Biblical Literary Criticism (1980) co-authored with Richard A. Spencer
- Varieties of Postmodern Theology (1989) co-authored with David Ray Griffin, Joe Holand
- Wrote Chapter (pages 253–267) on Poststructural Criticism in To each its own meaning (1999) Stephen R. Haynes(ed.), Steven L. McKenzie(ed.)
