= Elim =

Elim may refer to:

== Places ==
=== Africa ===
- Elim (Bible), one of the places where the Israelites camped following their Exodus from Egypt
- Elim, Namibia, a village in the north-east of the Republic of Namibia
- Elim, Western Cape, a village on the Agulhas Plain in the Western Cape of South Africa
- Elim Constituency, an electoral constituency in the Omusati Region of Namibia
- Elim Dune, a dune in the Sossusvlei salt and clay pan of the Namib desert

=== Australia ===
- Elim Aboriginal Mission, Queensland, Australia

=== Europe ===
- Elim, Anglesey, a village in Wales
- Elim, Drenthe, a village in the Netherlands
- Elim Chapel, Cwmdare, Rhondda Cynon Taf, Wales

=== United States ===
- Elim, Alaska, a city in Nome Census Area
- Elim, Pennsylvania, an unincorporated community and census-designated place in Upper Yoder Township, Cambria County
- Elim Township, Custer County, Nebraska

== Churches and religious organizations ==
- Elim Bible Institute and College, a Bible college in Lima, New York, US
- Elim Church Singapore, one of the first Pentecostal churches to be established in Singapore
- Elim Fellowship, a North America–based Pentecostal/charismatic Christian fellowship
- Elim Life Church, a nondenominational Charismatic Christian church in Lima, New York, US; see Elim Bible Institute and College § Related religious organizations
- Elim Pentecostal Church, a UK-based Pentecostal Christian denomination
- Misión Cristiana Elim Internacional (also Elim Central), a pentecostal megachurch in San Salvador, El Salvador

== People and characters ==
- Fínnachta (given name Elim), High King of Ireland in succession to his father
- A rank of angel mentioned in The Zohar in Exodus 43a
- Elim Garak, a fictional character from the television series Star Trek: Deep Space Nine
- Elim Meshchersky (1808–1844), Russian diplomat and poet

== Other ==
- Elim (Bethel, Missouri), USA; a historic house
- Elim Mission massacre

== See also ==
- LIM (disambiguation)
- Elimination (disambiguation)
