= Martin Mittelstadt =

Canadian Pentecostal scholar

Martin William Mittelstadt is a Canadian Pentecostal scholar, author, and educator. He is a professor of New Testament at Evangel University in Springfield, Missouri, and former President of the Society for Pentecostal Studies.
