= Jack Page (politician) =

American politician (1950–2020)

Member of the Alabama House of Representatives from the 29th district
- In office 1993 – November 3, 2010
- Preceded by: June Bugg
- Succeeded by: Becky Nordgren

Personal details
- Born: January 18, 1950 Kokura, Kyushu, Japan
- Died: December 14, 2020 (aged 70) Gadsden, Alabama, U.S.
- Party: Democratic

John G. Page III (January 18, 1950 – December 14, 2020) was an American politician who served in the Alabama House of Representatives from the 29th district from 1993 to 2010.

== Biography ==
Page was born in Kokura, Kyushu, Japan. He received his associate degree from Gadsden State Community College and his bachelor's degree from Jacksonville State University. He served in the United States Marine Corps during the Vietnam War. Page was a teacher, firefighter, and businessman. Page served on the Gadsden City Council.

Page had surgery in June 2020, which compromised his health. He died of COVID-19 in Gadsden, Alabama, on December 14, 2020, at age 70, during the COVID-19 pandemic in Alabama.
