= Eliminator =

Eliminator may refer to:

== People and characters ==
- The Eliminators (band), a band which covered "The Saint" from Surfbeat Behind the Iron Curtain, Volume 1
- The Eliminators, a professional wrestling tag team that consisted of John Kronus and Perry Saturn
- The Eliminator, a ring name of professional wrestler John Kronus
- Eli the Eliminator, a ring name of professional wrestler John Richmond

Fictional characters

- X the Eliminator, a fictional animated character created by Hanna-Barbera from Harvey Birdman: Attorney at Law and Birdman and the Galaxy Trio

== Film and television ==
- Eliminators (1986 film), a science fiction film
- Eliminators (2016 film), an action/thriller film
- Eliminator (game show), a CITV children's show presented by Michael Underwood
- "The Eliminator", an episode of the DIC cartoon G.I. Joe: A Real American Hero
- The Eliminator (film), a 2004 action film

== Music ==
- Eliminator (album), a 1983 studio album by ZZ Top
- "The Eliminators" (song), a 1990 song off the Mickey Hart album At the Edge

== Sports and games ==
- The Eliminator (American Gladiators), an event from the television series American Gladiators

=== Videogames ===
- Eliminator (1988 video game), a 3D-shooter video game for 16-bit home computers
- Eliminator (1981 video game), a multi-directional shooter space combat video game
- The Eliminator (video game), a 1981 game for the TRS-80
- Juiced: Eliminator, a 2006 video game

== Transport ==
- Kawasaki Eliminator, a line of cruiser-style motorcycles
- Eliminator (funny car), a series of Funny Cars driven by Don Nicholson
- The Eliminator (ZZ Top), a custom car built for ZZ Top

Fictional

- Eliminator (G.I. Joe), a fictional vehicle from the G.I. Joe Battleforce 2000 toy line

== See also ==
- Mr. Eliminator (album), 1964 album by Dale and the Del-Tones
- "Mr. Eliminator" (song), a 1964 song by Dale and the Del-Tones off the eponymous album Mr. Eliminator
- "Eliminator Jr." (song), a 1989 song by Sonic Youth off the album Daydream Nation
- X, the Eliminator ("Birdman" episode), a 2003 season 1 number 9 episode of Harvey Birdman, Attorney at Law
- Elimination (disambiguation)
