= Modern English Version =

English translation of the Bible

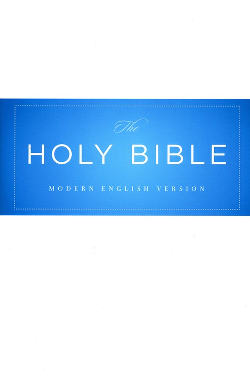
- Full name: Modern English Version
- Abbreviation: MEV
- Language: English
- Complete Bible published: 2014
- Authorship: James F. Linzey (chief editor)
- Derived from: King James Bible
- Textual basis: NT: Textus Receptus; OT: Jacob ben Hayyim Masoretic Text
- Translation type: Formal equivalence
- Publisher: Passio (Charisma House)
- Copyright: 2014 Military Bible Association
- Religious affiliation: Protestant
- Website: modernenglishversion.com
- Genesis 1:1–3 In the beginning God created the heavens and the earth. The earth was formless and void, darkness was over the surface of the deep, and the Spirit of God was moving over the surface of the water. God said, "Let there be light," and there was light. John 3:16 For God so loved the world that He gave His only begotten Son, that whoever believes in Him should not perish, but have eternal life.

The Modern English Version (MEV) is an English translation of the Bible begun in 2005 and completed in 2014. The work was edited by James F. Linzey, and is an update of the King James Version (KJV), re-translated from the Masoretic Text and the Textus Receptus.

== History ==
In June 2005, Southern Baptist minister, chief editor, and executive director Rev. James F. Linzey assembled and directed the Committee on Bible Translation, which included Stanley M. Horton serving as the senior editorial advisor. The translators began the work on June 2, 2005; they completed the New Testament on October 25, 2011, and the Old Testament on May 28, 2014.

Committee members include Eugene C. Ulrich, Stephen L. Herring, Eric Mitchell, Edward W. Watson, and T.J. Betts. The scholars working on the translation represent many academic institutions as professors or graduates, including Fuller Theological Seminary, Geneva College, Harvard University, Oxford Centre for Hebrew and Jewish Studies, Southwestern Baptist Theological Seminary, University of Notre Dame, Yale University, and others; and they represent many churches across a wide range of denominations, including the Church of England, Evangelical Lutheran Church in America, General Council of the Assemblies of God, Presbyterian Church of America, Southern Baptist Convention, Roman Catholic, Eastern Orthodox, and others.

== Translation philosophy ==
The Committee re-translated the Textus Receptus and the Jacob ben Hayyim edition of the Masoretic Text, using the KJV as a reference. The translators adhered to the principle of formal equivalence.
