= Verna M. Linzey =

American theologian (1919–2016)

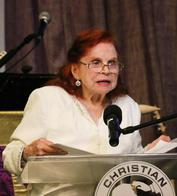
- Linzey speaking in 2014
- Born: May 17, 1919; Coffeyville, Kansas, U.S.
- Died: November 11, 2016 (aged 97); San Diego, California, U.S.
- Education: Southwestern Assemblies of God University (MA); Fuller Theological Seminary (DMin)
- Occupations: Bible translator, author, speaker
- Years active: 1945–2016
- Notable work: "Proverbs:" Modern English Version, New Tyndale Translation New Testament, The Leadership Bible: The Seven Principles of Leadership
- Theological work
- Tradition or movement: Evangelical
- Main interests: Biblical Theology, Bible Translation, Public Speaking
- Notable ideas: Creationism

Verna May Linzey (May 17, 1919 – November 11, 2016) was an American Evangelical theologian, a Southern Baptist, and the author of numerous Bibles and books. She was the chief editor of the New Tyndale Version, author of the introductions to the books of the Bible in the Modern English Version Bible (MEV), translator of the Book of Proverbs for the MEV, and she was on the faculty Advisory Board at St. Elias Seminary and Graduate School, located in Hamilton, Virginia. In 2006, The Christian Writer's Guild awarded her the "Best Non-Fiction of the Year" award for authoring The Baptism with the Holy Spirit.

In 2011, she received the "Leader of the Year" award at the 2011 Leadership Summit hosted by The Heritage Foundation. She authored the hymn O Blessed Jesus.

She received a MA at Southwestern Assemblies of God University, a Doctor of Ministry degree at Fuller Theological Seminary, and an honorary DD at Kingsway Theological Seminary.

== Books ==
A prolific Bible translator and writer, Linzey authored and edited several Bibles and books, including:

- "Proverbs:" Modern English Version (ed. by N. Blake Hearson and James F. Linzey), 2014. Passio
- New Tyndale Version (chief editor), 2013. Military Bible Association.
- The Leadership Bible: The Seven Principles of Leadership (editor), 2013. Military Bible Association.
- Baptism in the Spirit (co-ed. with James Linzey), 2012. Military Bible Association. ISBN 978-1-936857-07-4
- The Baptism with the Holy Spirit, 2005. Xulon Press. ISBN 1-594670-59-5
- Spirit Baptism, 2009. Xulon Press. ISBN 978-1-60477-699-7
- The Gifts of the Spirit, 2014. Creation House. ISBN 978-1-62136-645-4
- Power in the Spirit (co-ed. with James Linzey), 2017. Military Bible Association
