= Regent University =

Christian university in Virginia Beach, Virginia, US

Coordinates: 36.80270°N 76.19619°W

- Motto: Christian Leadership to Change the World
- Type: Private university
- Established: 1977; 49 years ago
- Religious affiliation: Interdenominational; Evangelical
- Endowment: $69,500,000 in 2020
- Faculty: 141 (Full-time) and 45 (Part-time)
- Administrative staff: 402
- Students: 10,657 (fall 2024)
- Undergraduates: 5,049
- Postgraduates: 5,608
- Other students: 1,306 (non-degree seeking, first professional)
- Location: Virginia Beach, Virginia, U.S.
- Campus: Suburban
- Colors: Blue, green
- Nickname: Royals
- Sporting affiliations: NCAA Division III – C2C NCCAA
- Mascot: Rex the Royal
- Website: regent.edu

Regent University is a private Christian university in Virginia Beach, Virginia, United States. Founded by Pat Robertson in 1977 as Christian Broadcasting Network University, its name was changed to Regent University in 1990. Regent offers on-campus programs as well as distance education. Regent offers associate, bachelor's, master's, and doctoral degrees in over 70 courses of study. The university is accredited by the Commission on Colleges of the Southern Association of Colleges and Schools.

== History ==
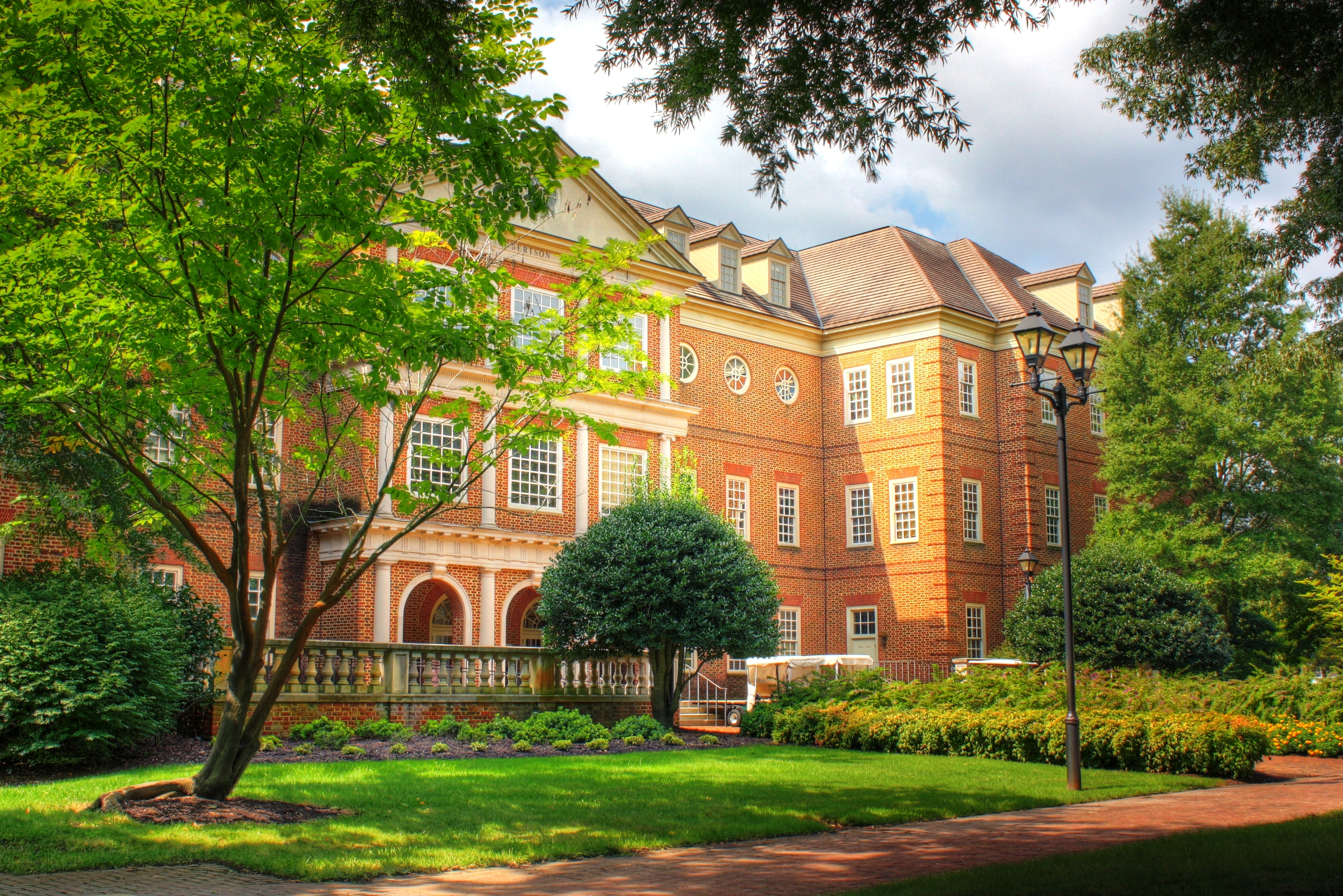
Robertson Hall, home to the School of Law and Robertson School of Government

Plans for the university, originally named Christian Broadcasting Network University, were begun in 1977 by Pat Robertson; Robertson remained Chancellor until his death in 2023. In 1990, the name was changed to Regent University. The university's motto is "Christian Leadership to Change the World."

The first class, consisting of seventy-seven students, began in fall of 1978 when the school leased classroom space in Chesapeake, Virginia. In 1980, the first graduating class held its commencement; the school of education opened that Fall. That year, the university took residence for the first time on its current campus in Virginia Beach, Virginia. The school proceeded to open its schools of business, divinity, government, and law by the mid-1980s. In 1984, Regent University received accreditation from the Southern Association of Colleges and Schools. In 1997, online classes began.

In 1995, the university opened a secondary campus in Alexandria, Virginia but sold it soon after. In 2000, Regent began an undergraduate degree-completion curriculum under the auspices of a new program, the Center for Professional Studies. This would later become the school of undergraduate studies, before finally being renamed as the college of arts and sciences in 2012.

== Campus ==
=== Architecture and setting ===
Regent University has a 70 acres (280,000 m^{2}) campus of historicist neo-Georgian architecture, and is situated in the coastal city of Virginia Beach, Virginia. The university was named in 2015 among the thirty most beautiful college campuses in the South.

=== Academic and communal facilities ===
The University Library Building houses the university's libraries and Robertson Hall is home to the Schools of Government, Law, and Undergraduate Studies. The Communication & Performing Arts Center, home for the School of Communication & the Arts, is a 135,000-square-foot (12,500 m^{2}) building with two theatres, a production studio, sound stage, screening theatres, and a backlot. The Student Center is a 31,000-square-foot (2,900 m^{2}) facility includes a bookstore, student organization offices, dining hall, computer lab, and student lounge. The Administration Building, along with administrative offices, includes the School of Education. The Classroom Building accommodates the schools of Business & Leadership and Psychology & Counseling. The adjoined Chapel and Divinity Building are the most recent additions to the campus, completed in 2013.

=== The Founders Inn and Spa ===
Completed in 1990, The Founders Inn and Spa hotel was originally part of the Christian Broadcasting Network before Regent University assumed ownership. Management was assumed by Hilton Hotel company in 2018. The hotel features neo-Georgian architecture in keeping with the rest of the university campus. The name of the hotel refers to the Founding Fathers.

== Reputation ==
=== Online programs rankings ===
Regent University was ranked in 2015 by U.S. News & World Report as the 11th best online undergraduate program in the nation, and as the second best by OEDb in 2009. Regent is ranked 21st, 46th, and 78th, respectively, for its online graduate education programs, online graduate business programs, and online MBA. Regent's online MBA faculty was ranked first nationally in 2013 by U.S. News & World Report.

=== ABA national competition wins and moot court program ===
Moot court teams from the Regent University School of Law have placed as quarter-finalists or better in over 100 moot court competitions, winning more than 40 national and regional events. In 2006 and 2007, Regent Law won several national ABA moot court and negotiation competitions succeeding against teams from Harvard and Yale. Regent's moot court program was ranked sixth in the nation in 2015.

=== Ideology ===
In a 1995 Atlantic article, theologian Harvey Cox examined Regent University as part of a broader reflection on the Religious Right in America. Although some had called Regent "the Harvard of the Christian Right," Cox argued that such labels often obscure more than they explain. He described the university not as "a boot camp for rightist cadres," but as "a microcosm of the theological and intellectual turbulence" within a movement often portrayed as ideologically uniform. To illustrate this point, Cox quoted then university president Terry Lindvall, who compared the campus community to a motley and ecumenical group of Chaucerian pilgrims. Each student, he suggested, was on a personal journey to repent, worship, and tell a unique story. Cox used the university to challenge caricatures of religious conservatism and encouraged readers to look past political labels to the deeper human and spiritual convictions shaping institutions like Regent.

In May 2008, Regent University's School of Divinity co-hosted a scholarly colloquium on missiology with the National Council of Churches and the Virginia Council of Churches, both associated with mainline Protestant denominations. The event brought together liberal and conservative theologians to examine Christian mission in the context of the 400th anniversary of the Jamestown settlement. Regent theology professor Amos Yong stated that the university's participation reflected a desire to posture itself as a broadly evangelical institution.

=== Bush administration hires ===
According to Regent University, more than 150 of its graduates were hired by the federal government during the George W. Bush presidency including dozens in Bush's administration. As it was previously rare for alumni to go into government, Boston Globe journalist Charlie Savage suggested that the appointment of Office of Personnel Management director Kay Coles James, the former dean of Regent's government school, caused this sharp increase in Regent alumni employed in the government. An article about a Regent graduate who interviewed for a government position and Regent's low school rankings were cited as an example of the Bush administration hiring applicants with strong conservative credentials but weaker academic qualifications and less civil rights law experience than past candidates in the Civil Rights Division. In addition to Savage, several other commentators made similar assertions. Savage also noted that the school had improved since its days of "dismal numbers" and that the school has had wins in national moot-court and negotiation competitions. Though a prominent critic of the school, Barry Lynn of Americans United for the Separation of Church and State advised against "underestimat[ing] the quality of a lot of the people that are there."

=== Relationship with Donald Trump ===
In October 2016, Regent University was the site of an October 2016 rally for presidential candidate Donald Trump. A handful of Regent alumni wrote that Trump's values, however, were "wrong for the university" and expressed concern that hosting the rally would be viewed as an all-but-official endorsement by Regent of his campaign. Later, Regent alumnus Jay Sekulow served as a defense lawyer for Trump throughout his first presidency.

== Faculty ==
Regent has 138 full-time and 48 part-time faculty members, five of whom are Fulbright Scholars. Several were previously in politics. Former U.S. Attorney General under the Bush administration, John Ashcroft, was named distinguished professor in 2005 teaching a two-week course each semester in the Robertson School of Government and lecturing on national security law. Also named distinguished professor was former chief of naval operations Admiral Vern Clark who teaches courses in leadership and government. In 2006, former Israeli prime minister Ehud Barak was a visiting faculty member for the school of undergraduate studies. Herb Titus, founding dean of the law school, was the 1996 vice-presidential candidate of the Constitution Party and a drafter of the Constitutional Restoration Act to permit government officials to acknowledge "God as the sovereign source of law, liberty, or government". Former Virginia Governor Bob McDonnell began teaching at Robertson School of Government in 2017. The School of Divinity includes the theologian Graham Twelftree, Dean Emeritus H. Vinson Synan, Pentecostal theologian Amos Yong, and church historian Stanley M. Burgess. The late J. Rodman Williams was professor emeritus. Former US representative Michele Bachmann became dean of the Robertson School of Government in 2021.

== Athletics ==
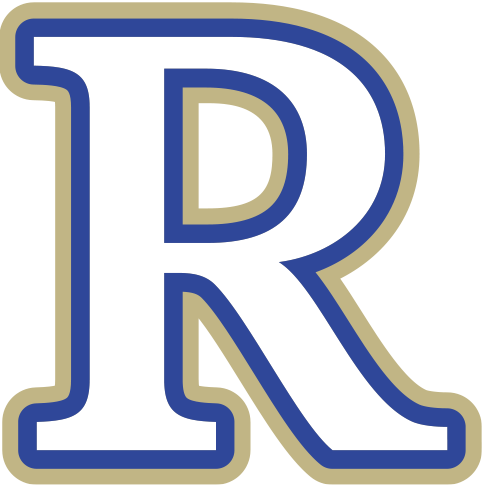
Regent athletics monogram

Regent University's athletic teams are known as the Royals. The primary logo, known as the cipher, consists of the letter "R" adorned with a crown. The crown comes from the original crown used in the Regent University Crest representing the Lord's sovereignty over all.

The Royals compete as a member of the National Christian Collegiate Athletic Association (NCCAA) in the South Region of the Division I level. Notable Royals include 3x National Champion Marelly Balentina who won the indoor and outdoor NCCAA National Championships for Track and Field in the Women's Javelin and Shotput. Balentina was also Named 2022's VASID women's field athlete of the year.

On September 1, 2024, Regent University began its exploratory year in National Collegiate Athletic Association (NCAA) Division III. Regent's exploratory year will last throughout the 2024–2025 academic year. Upon successful completion, the university will then apply for a three-year provisional membership. On November 19, 2024, the Royals joined the Coast to Coast Athletic Conference (C2C). The university will begin competing in the C2C during the 2025–2026 academic year.

Regent competes in ten intercollegiate varsity sports: Men's sports include basketball, baseball (added in 2024–25), cross country, soccer, track & field and volleyball (added in 2024); while women's sports include basketball, cross country, soccer, track & field and volleyball.

== Notable alumni ==
Regent University alumni include:

- Jennifer Elvgren – American writer
- Tony Hale – American actor (born 1970)
- Todd Hunter – American author, church planter and Anglican bishop
- Gordon Klingenschmitt – American military officer, politician, and religious figure (born 1968)
- Charles Martin – American writer
- Bob McDonnell – American attorney and politician (born 1954)
- Winsome Earle-Sears – American politician (born 1964)
- Jay Sekulow – American attorney (born 1956)
- Jordan Sekulow – American lawyer
- Brennan Swain
- Jason Upton
- Antonio Zarro – Italian-American director and actor
