= Pneuma (journal) =

Peer-reviewed academic journal

Pneuma: The Journal of the Society for Pentecostal Studies
- Discipline: Pentecostal history and theology
- Language: English
- Edited by: L. William Oliverio

Publication details
- History: 1979–present
- Publisher: Brill Publishers on behalf of the Society for Pentecostal Studies
- Frequency: Quarterly
- Impact factor: 0.2 (2024)

Standard abbreviations
- ISO 4: Pneuma

Indexing
- ISSN: 0272-0965 (print); 1570-0747 (web)

Links
- Journal homepage; Online access

Pneuma: The Journal of the Society for Pentecostal Studies is a peer-reviewed theological journal of the Society for Pentecostal Studies. It was established in 1979 and William W. Menzies (Evangel College) served as its first editor-in-chief. The current editor-in-chief is L. William Oliverio (Northwest University). The journal is abstracted and indexed in the Emerging Sources Citation Index, and according to the Journal Citation Reports it has a 2024 impact factor of 0.2.
