= Stanley M. Burgess =

American academic

Stanley Milton Burgess was Professor Emeritus, Missouri State University. He was author or editor of several books, including The Holy Spirit: Medieval Roman Catholic and Reformation Traditions and The New International Dictionary of Pentecostal and Charismatic Movements.

== Early life ==
Stanley Milton Burgess was born on November 27, 1937, in Nagercoil, India to Assemblies of God missionaries John and Bernice Burgess. The Burgesses were establishing Bethel Bible College in the State of Travancore (now Kerala). In 1950 the Burgesses returned to the United States. Stanley began to attend Beecher High School, near his home in Flint, Michigan, and graduated at 15. He received his BA and MA in 1958 and 1959 from the University of Michigan, and his Ph.D. in history from the University of Missouri-Columbia in 1971. He died on March 17, 2025 at the age of 87.

=== Main works ===
- Burgess, Stanley M. (1984). The Holy Spirit: Ancient Christian Traditions. Peabody, Mass.: Hendrickson Publishers. ISBN 9780801045783.
- Burgess, Stanley M. (1989). The Holy Spirit: Eastern Christian Traditions. Peabody, Mass.: Hendrickson Publishers. ISBN 9780913573815.
- Burgess, Stanley M. (1997). The Holy Spirit: Medieval Roman Catholic and Reformation Traditions. Peabody, Mass.: Hendrickson Publishers. ISBN 1441242368.
