= Elimination =

Elimination may refer to:

== Science and medicine ==
- Elimination (pharmacology), processes by which a drug is eliminated from an organism
- Elimination reaction, an organic reaction in which two functional groups split to form an organic product
- Hazard elimination, the most effective type of hazard control
- Regional elimination of an infectious disease in one part of the world, as opposed to its eradication from the entire world

== Logic and mathematics ==
- Elimination theory, the theory of the methods to eliminate variables between polynomial equations.
- Disjunctive syllogism, a rule of inference
- Gaussian elimination, a method of solving systems of linear equations
- Fourier–Motzkin elimination, an algorithm for reducing systems of linear inequalities
- Process of elimination, enumerating all answers and discarding each unfit answer
- Variable elimination

== Games and competitions ==
- Elimination (arcade game), 1974 arcade game by Atari Inc. subsidiary Key Games
- Elimination from postseason contention in a sports league
- Elimination tournament, a knock-out style of tournament
- Elimination, a variant of the "lifestyle-invading" game Assassin, played with clothes-pins

== Music ==
- Elimination (album), a 1994 album by Jughead's Revenge
- Elimination, a 2002 album by Deceptikonz
- "Elimination", a 1989 single from Overkill's album The Years of Decay

== Accounting ==
- Elimination (accounting), the act of recording amounts in a consolidation statement to remove the effects of inter-company transactions

== See also ==
- Eliminator (disambiguation)
