= Demos Shakarian =

American businessman of Armenian origin

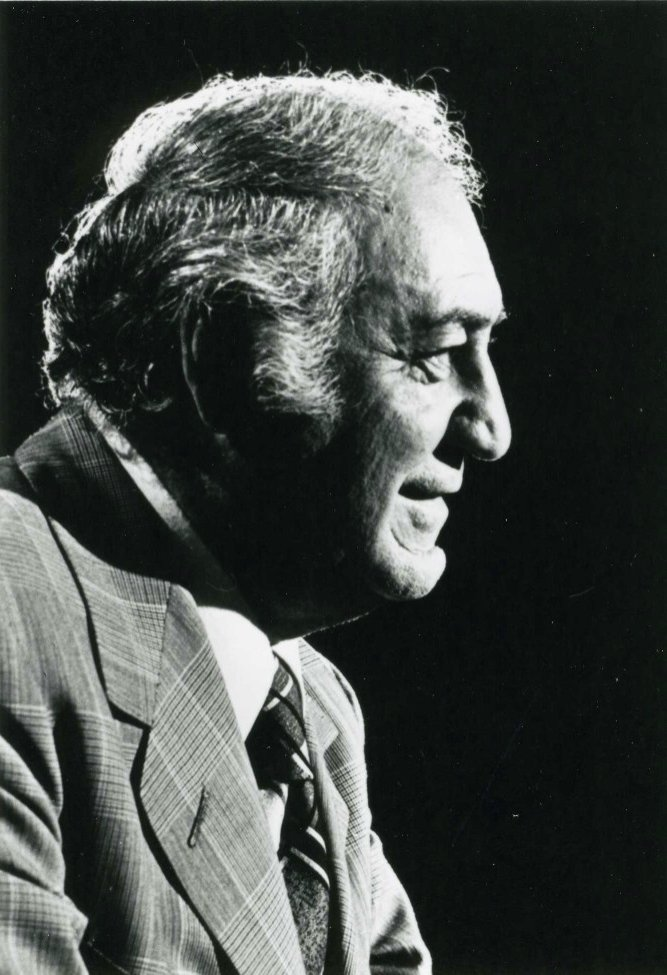
Demos Shakarian

Demos Shakarian (Armenian: Դեմոս Շաքարյան; 21 July 1913 – 23 July 1993) was an American businessman of Armenian origin from Los Angeles who founded the Full Gospel Business Men's Fellowship International (FGBMFI). His story and the story of FGBMFI is the subject of the book The Happiest People on Earth, written by John and Elizabeth Sherrill (Guideposts Magazine) and published in 1975.

== Early life ==
Demos was named after his Armenian grandfather, who, with most of his relatives, was exiled in the late 1800s from Erivan Governorate (Armenia) to Karakala (Merkezkarakale) village, Kars Oblast, Russia, for their heretic folk-protestant religious views. In Kars they met and joined like-minded Spiritual Christian Pryguny, denominations of various volunteer settlers and religious exiles from Russia. Among the Pryguny in Romanovo village was a "Boy Prophet", Efim Gerasimovitch Klubnikin, who, as early as 1855, when he also lived in Erivan Governorate, began to have visions of an unspeakable tragedy and warned that all must flee to a "place of refuge."

In 1895, neighboring Spiritual Christian Dukhobortsy in Transcaucasia staged a mass protest against the military, burned their guns, about 400 were jailed in Kars and Tiflis, half exiled, and about 2,000 died. The main road from Kars to Tiflis passed through Romanovo, where Klubnikin now lived and witnessed the passing of hundreds of escorted Spiritual Christian prisoners. Writer Leo N. Tolstoy protested to the Tsar about this cruelty, resulting in aid from the Society of Friends, London, and the Canadian government to move over 7,400 (about one-third) of all Dukhobortsy to central Canada.

Immediately other Spiritual Christian tribes in Kars and Erevan petitioned to follow the Dukhobortsy to Canada. A Russian businessman in Los Angeles, Peter Demens had been promoting California to immigrants from Russia for a decade, objected to Dukhobortsy settling in Canada, and personally diverted most all non-Dukhobor Spiritual Christians arriving after 1901 away from Canada to Los Angeles, while the Freedomites began protesting against the Canadian government. As large groups of Pryguny, including the Shakarians and Klubnikins, began arriving in Los Angeles in 1905, most settled within a mile of the Azusa Street Revival as it was starting, and were delighted to meet spiritual faiths in America similar to theirs.

Demos Sr. died while working on the construction of the Los Angeles and Salt Lake Railroad in Nevada, and his young son Isaac became the head of the family. Isaac married Zarouhi Yessayian, and he became a prosperous dairy farmer in Downey, California. Demos Jr. entered the family business and their dairy herd grew, becoming the largest in the world at the time. He married Rose Gabrielian in 1933.

== Evangelistic campaigns ==
Shakarian used his organizational abilities to facilitate evangelistic campaigns, particularly working with Charles S. Price. Other evangelists at his events included Tommy Hicks and William Branham and Oral Roberts. Shakarian spent most of his adult life building the Fellowship for free. Even honorariums that were given to him at speaking engagements he would deposit them back into the ministry. Every year at the annual board meeting he would resign his position as president, step out into the hall, and allow the 200 man board to vote on the next president. The Fellowship grew into over 190 countries. Hundreds of other ministries were birthed from the Fellowship. Shakarian played a key role in working with Paul Crouch to help launch Trinity Broadcasting Network (TBN). Joel Osteen’s ministry started from his father John Osteen. Shakarian played a key role in saving that ministry in the early days. When John was removed as a pastor due to his beliefs in the Pentecostal movement, Shakarian immediately caught a flight to be with John, convinced him not to quit but to start his own ministry wherein Shakarian funded the launching of John's first tent meeting.

== The Full Gospel Business Men's Fellowship International ==
Shakarian noted that his tent campaigns mainly attracted women, and Full Gospel Business Men's Fellowship International was established to encourage more participation by men by providing a platform for businessmen to give religious testimonies. The plan was supported by Oral Roberts, and under his leadership, the FGBMFI had chapters in over 190 countries. Richard Shakarian became president after his father died. Francis Owusu is now international president of FGBMFI.

== Beliefs ==
Shakarian was a third-generation Pentecostal, and he believed in the "Full Gospel", that all the supernatural events in the New Testament should be understood literally, and could also occur today. In particular, he believed that God healed the sick and injured (including on one occasion his own cattle herd from tuberculosis), and that Christians filled with the Holy Spirit received visions and promptings from God, including direct messages.

Shakarian considered that although God sometimes prompted him to pray for healings, he was primarily to be a "helper", as defined by 1 Corinthians 12:28.

He also believed that the rise of the Charismatic Movement was a harbinger of the Second Coming, and that there would be a persecution of Christians in America just before this occurred.
