= Harold D. Hunter =

American renewal theologian and historian

Harold D. Hunter is a renewal theologian and historian within the Pentecostal movement. He serves the International Pentecostal Holiness Church.
