= James F. Linzey =

American Baptist Minister

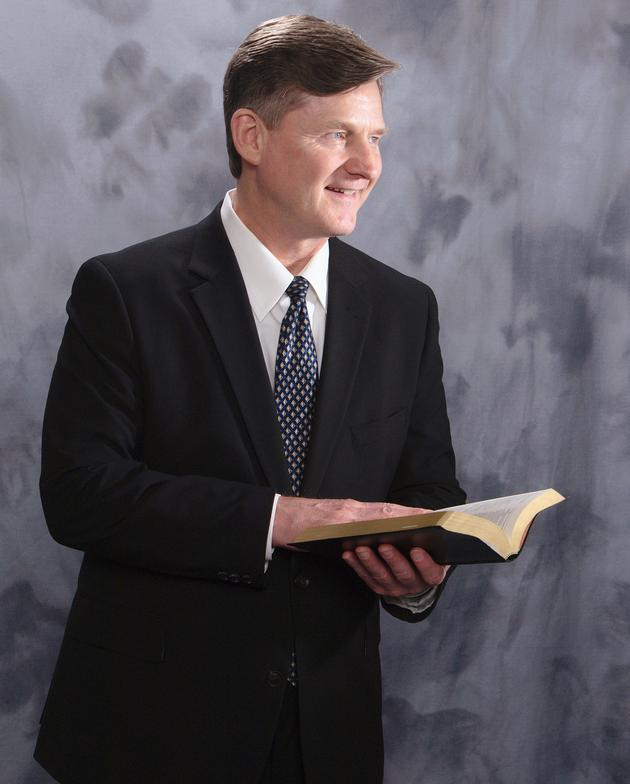
- Former Air Force Space Command Captain James F Linzey (Ret.), November 5, 1989
- Born: September 26, 1958 (age 68); San Diego, California, U.S.
- Education: Southern California College (BA); Fuller Theological Seminary (MDiv)
- Occupations: Former Air Force captain, minister author, songwriter
- Years active: 1985–1998
- Theological work
- Tradition or movement: Southern Baptist Convention
- Main interests: Military, Biblical theology, Bible translation

"Creator of the Universe"
- Lyrics: James F. Linzey, 2020
- Music: James F. Linzey, 2020

James F. Linzey, M.Div. (born September 26, 1958) is an American ordained minister in the Southern Baptist Convention. The chief editor and executive director of the Modern English Version Bible, he is the author of the United States Space Force hymn, "Creator of the Universe".

Linzey's degrees include a B.A. from Southern California College and an M.Div. from Fuller Theological Seminary. He also attended the Billy Graham School of Evangelism in Asheville, North Carolina.

== History ==
After the creation of the United States Space Force in December 2019, Linzey wrote a prayer petitioning God for safety for the Space Force Guardians on each flight into space.

Linzey moved to Kansas, where he finishing writing the hymn. He reached out to churches across the country, hoping they would use it in services. The hymn's acceptance gained momentum. The Baptist Press published a headline article on the hymn, which assisted in this matter.

"Creator of the Universe" came to him while studying koine Greek at the California campus of Westminster Theological Seminary in the City of Escondido where he resided. "I was thinking about the awe and wonder of God. The words just flowed," Linzey said.

The February 29, 2020, edition of the Coffeyville Journal gives more details on how the hymn was written:

On February 12, 2020, Rev. James F. Linzey, who served as a highly decorated Air Force Captain, felt led by Almighty God to write the Space Force Hymn. He set his pen to paper the next day. He had been working on the hymn on an old upright piano that was out of tune in the former Dalton Museum building in Coffeyville, Kansas, which he was cleaning. On February 22, 2020, he completed the hymn, creating what many believe to be his lasting legacy for the Department of the Air Force, for which he served for 12 years. Coffeyville proudly serves as "Home of the United States Space Force Hymn, Creator of the Universe."

The Baptist Messenger stated that "Creator of the Universe]" joins other hymns often associated with various branches of the U.S. military: Air Force: "Lord, Guard and Guide the Men who Fly"; Army: "Eternal Father, Hear our Prayer"; Coast Guard: "Ruler of the Land and Sea"; Navy: "Eternal Father, Strong to Save"; and Marine Corps: "Serving for Thee."

== Lyrics ==
The first and last verses to "Creator of the Universe" are as follows:

"Creator of the universe,
Watch over those who fly,
Through the great space beyond the earth,
And worlds beyond the sky . . .

"Eternal Father, strong to save,
In prayer before Thy light;
In solitude of sovereign grace,
Grant courage for each flight. Amen."

== Critical reviews ==
Jenny Rose Curtis reported, "Freedom From Religion Foundation (FFRF) urges the U.S. Department of Defense to get rid of the hymn Creator of the Universe because of its faith-based lyrics," but went on to state that the FFRF was refuted by the Alliance Defending Freedom.

Retired Navy Commander Don Biadog, a former command chaplain of MCAS Miramar, commented in a K-Love radio article on June 13, 2024, "Due to the creation of the United States Space Force Hymn, 'Creator of the Universe', many are thrilled about performing this new addition to their 'arsenal' of music." The Baptist Press stated that the stately hymn in 2-2 time is a prayer for the safety and courage of Space Force crews."

An active duty Navy Petty Officer, DC1 Heber Lima, who is also an ordained Southern Baptist Convention pastor, commented, "The Space Force Hymn is an inspirational hymn which motivates me to worship the Creator of the universe, and is useful in any church service as a standard hymn;" and former Air Force Sergeant Jonathan Sciano added, "I like 'Creator of the Universe'.

== Books ==
A Bible translator and writer, Linzey authored and edited numerous Bibles and books:

- Modern English Version (MEV) Bible (author/chief editor), 2014. Passio.
- "Acts of the Apostles:" Modern English Version (translated with Michael Pacella, III), 2014. Passio.
- The Leadership Bible: The Seven Principles of Leadership (chairman, editorial committee), 2013. Military Bible Association.
- Baptism in the Spirit (co-ed. with Verna Linzey), 2012. Military Bible Association. ISBN 978-1-936857-07-4
- The Holy Spirit, 2003. Xulon Press. ISBN 1-59467-055-2
- A Divine Appointment in Washington, D.C., 1999. Huntington House Publishers. ISBN 978-1-56384-169-9
- "The Ten Commandments As the Root of American Culture:" Why the Conservative Mind Matters, 2009. Higher Standard Publishers. ISBN 978-0-615-23230-0
