= Journal of Pentecostal Theology =

- Discipline: Pentecostal theology
- Language: English
- Edited by: Lee Roy Martin, John Christopher Thomas

Publication details
- History: 1992-present
- Publisher: Brill Publishers for the Center for Pentecostal Theology, Pentecostal Theological Seminary
- Frequency: Biannually

Standard abbreviations
- ISO 4: J. Pentecostal Theol.

Indexing
- ISSN: 0966-7369 (print); 1745-5251 (web)
- LCCN: 95658523
- OCLC no.: 471117391

Links
- Journal homepage; Journal at Brill; Journal at Brill Online

The Journal of Pentecostal Theology is a peer-reviewed academic journal covering theological research from a Pentecostal perspective. It was established at the Pentecostal Theological Seminary and is maintained by the Center for Pentecostal Theology. The editors-in-chief are Lee Roy Martin and John Christopher Thomas (Pentecostal Theological Seminary).

== History ==
The journal was founded by editors-in-chief John Christopher Thomas, Rickie D. Moore, and Steven Jack Land in 1992. Previously published by SAGE Publications, it has moved to Brill Publishers in July 2007.

== Abstracting and indexing ==
The journal is abstracted and indexed by the ATLA Religion Database and Scopus.
