= R. Hollis Gause =

American Pentecostal theologian (1925–2015)

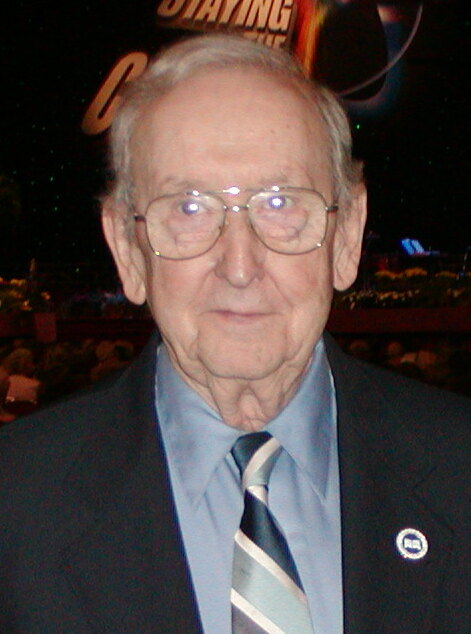
- Gause in 2002
- Born: Rufus Hollis Gause, Jr. July 1, 1925; Clinton, South Carolina
- Died: September 6, 2015 (aged 90); Cleveland, Tennessee
- Occupation: Theologian

Academic background
- Education: Emmanuel College; Presbyterian College; Columbia Theological Seminary; Emory University
- Thesis: The Lukan Transfiguration Account (1975)
- Doctoral advisor: William A. Beardslee

Rufus Hollis Gause, Jr. (July 1, 1925 – September 6, 2015), known as R. Hollis Gause, was an American Pentecostal theologian and pastor. He was affiliated with the Church of God (Cleveland, Tennessee). Gause was the first dean of the Pentecostal Theological Seminary.

== Early life and education ==
Gause was born July 1, 1925. His father was a Pentecostal Holiness Church minister and the family moved to the Church of God (Cleveland) when Gause was a teenager. Gause married Beulah Hunt in 1948 and they had a son, Valdane.

He graduated from high school in Clinton, South Carolina. He attended junior college at Emmanuel College in Georgia and finished his undergraduate studies at Presbyterian College back in Clinton. He then studied at Columbia Theological Seminary in Decatur, Georgia and received a Bachelor of Divinity degree in 1949 (which was upgraded to an M.Div. in 1971). He would eventually receive a Ph.D. in New Testament from Emory University in 1975 with a dissertation titled, The Lukan Transfiguration Account directed by William A. Beardslee.

== Career ==
Gause began his teaching career in 1947 at Lee College in Cleveland, Tennessee. He taught there from 1947 to 1975 and 1982-1984.

Gause joined the lay ministry of the Church of God in 1943 and was promoted to the church's ordained ministry in 1954.

Gause became the first dean and director of the Church of God Graduate School of Christian Ministries (now Pentecostal Theological Seminary) in 1975. Gause served as president of the Society for Pentecostal Studies from 1971 to 1972. He also pastored the Warren Church of God in Warren, Michigan (now known as the Maranatha Church of God) from 1982 to 1984.

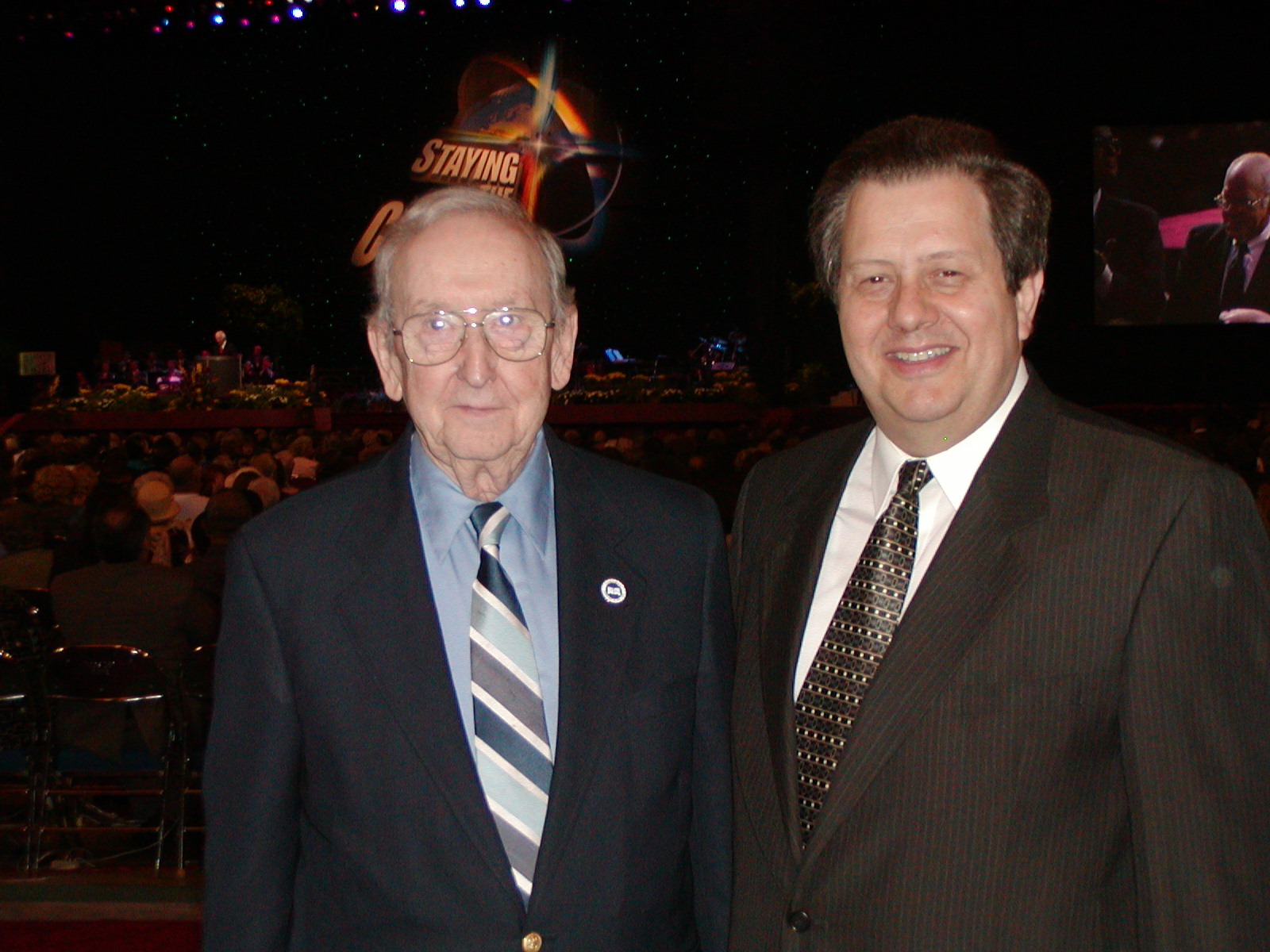
R. Hollis Gause and Steven J. Land at the Church of God General Assembly 2002

Gause has been described by Chris E.W. Green as a mentoring figure to the members of the Cleveland School of Pentecostal scholars.

Gause has authored books of both a popular and scholarly nature. In 2006 he co-authored a book with Kimberly Ervin Alexander entitled Women in Leadership: A Pentecostal Perspective published by the Church of God Theological Seminary's Center for Pentecostal Leadership and Care.

A festschrift in honor of Gause titled Passover, Pentecost and Parousia and edited by Steven J. Land, Rickie D. Moore, and John Christopher Thomas was published in 2010.

Gause died in 2015 at the age of 90.

== Selected works ==
- Church of God Polity (Cleveland, TN: Pathway Press, 1973).
- Living in the Spirit: The Way of Salvation (Cleveland, TN: Pathway Press,1980).
- Revelation: God's Stamp of Sovereignty on History (Cleveland, TN: Pathway Press, 1983).
- R. Hollis & Beulah Gause, Women in the Body of Christ (Cleveland, TN: Pathway Press, 1984).
- The Preaching of Paul: A Study of Romans (Cleveland, TN: Pathway Press, 1986).
- Kimberly Ervin Alexander and R. Hollis Gause, Women in Leadership: A Pentecostal Perspective (Cleveland, TN: Center for Pentecostal Leadership and Care, 2006).
- Living in the Spirit: The Way of Salvation, Revised and Expanded edition (Cleveland, TN: CPT Press, 2010).
- The Lukan Transfiguration Account: The Exalted Lord in the Glory of the Kingdom of God (Centre for Pentecostal Theology Classics Series; Cleveland, TN: CPT Press, 2020, published posthumously).
- Hebrews (Brill, 2022) ISBN 978-90-04-46579-4
