= Roger Stronstad =

Canadian theologian

Roger J. Stronstad (died 29 August, 2022) was a Canadian Pentecostal Bible scholar and theologian. He was an associate professor in Bible and Theology at Summit Pacific College (formerly Western Pentecostal Bible College) in Abbotsford, British Columbia, having retired from there in 2017. He also published six books.

== Works ==
In The Charismatic Theology of St. Luke (1984, substantially updated 2012), he argues for a Pentecostal interpretation of Luke-Acts. He contends that Luke believed the gift of the Spirit was vocational, rather than soteriological or ethical, i.e. the Holy Spirit was given to empower them to be witnesses, rather than to bring them salvation. This book has been translated in French (La théologie charismatique de St Luc).

In Spirit, Scripture and Theology (1995), Stronstad surveys Pentecostal hermeneutics (methods of biblical interpretation), examining the views of Gordon D. Fee, Howard M. Ervin and William H. Menzies. Again he returns to Luke-Acts to formulate his own hermeneutical approach.

In The Prophethood of All Believers (1999, reprinted with minimal introductory updates 2010), he builds on his interpretation of Luke-Acts, focusing on the Holy Spirit as the giver of prophetic gifts to the Church.

He is also co-editor (with French L. Arrington and Timothy Jenney) of the Life in the Spirit New Testament Commentary (2003).
