= The New International Dictionary of Pentecostal and Charismatic Movements =

Reference work on charismatic Christianity

- Title page of the original edition
- Publication date: 1988
- ISBN: 0310441005

The New International Dictionary of Pentecostal and Charismatic Movements is a reference work on charismatic Christianity which includes the three streams of Pentecostalism, the Charismatic Movement, and the Neocharismatic movement. It is edited primarily by Stanley M. Burgess. Published in 2002, it is the "revised and expanded edition" of the 1988 Dictionary of Pentecostal and Charismatic Movements. Both editions are published by Zondervan.

The original edition states the contributors to the volume come from both within and without the movement(s), and a "balanced overview" is attempted. It concentrates on North America and Europe, where the movement originated; rather than Latin America, Africa, and Asia, where the majority of members are found. The revised and expanded edition again asserts a "balanced overview" and breadth of contributors. While it attempts to be comprehensive, it does admit some imbalances in coverage mainly due to the absence of complete scholarly data for some countries.

== Editions and editors ==
- Dictionary of Pentecostal and Charismatic Movements ed. Stanley M. Burgess and Gary B. McGee, assoc. ed. Patrick H. Alexander. (Grand Rapids, Michigan: Zondervan, 1988). Part of the Regency Reference Library (an imprint of Zondervan); xi + 911 pages.
- The New International Dictionary of Pentecostal and Charismatic Movements, revised and expanded edition. ed. Stanley M. Burgess; assoc. ed. Eduard M. van der Maas. (Grand Rapids, Michigan: Zondervan, 2002). xxxi + 1278 pages.

As of both editions, Stanley Burgess is a professor of Religious Studies at Southwest Missouri State University (later Missouri State University) in Springfield, Missouri. As of the first edition, Gary McGee is an associate professor of Church History at the Assemblies of God Theological Seminary also in Springfield; and Patrick Alexander is an editor in Republic, Missouri. As of the second edition, Eduard van der Maas is a former editor of textbooks and reference works at Zondervan.

== Awards ==
First edition:

- 1990 Christianity Today Book of the Year
- 1990 Evangelical Christian Publishers Association finalist for Christian Book of the Year
- 1989 Evangelical Christian Publishers Association finalist
- 1989 Preaching Magazine Book Award

Second edition:

- 2003 Christianity Today Book of the Year
