= Religion and health =

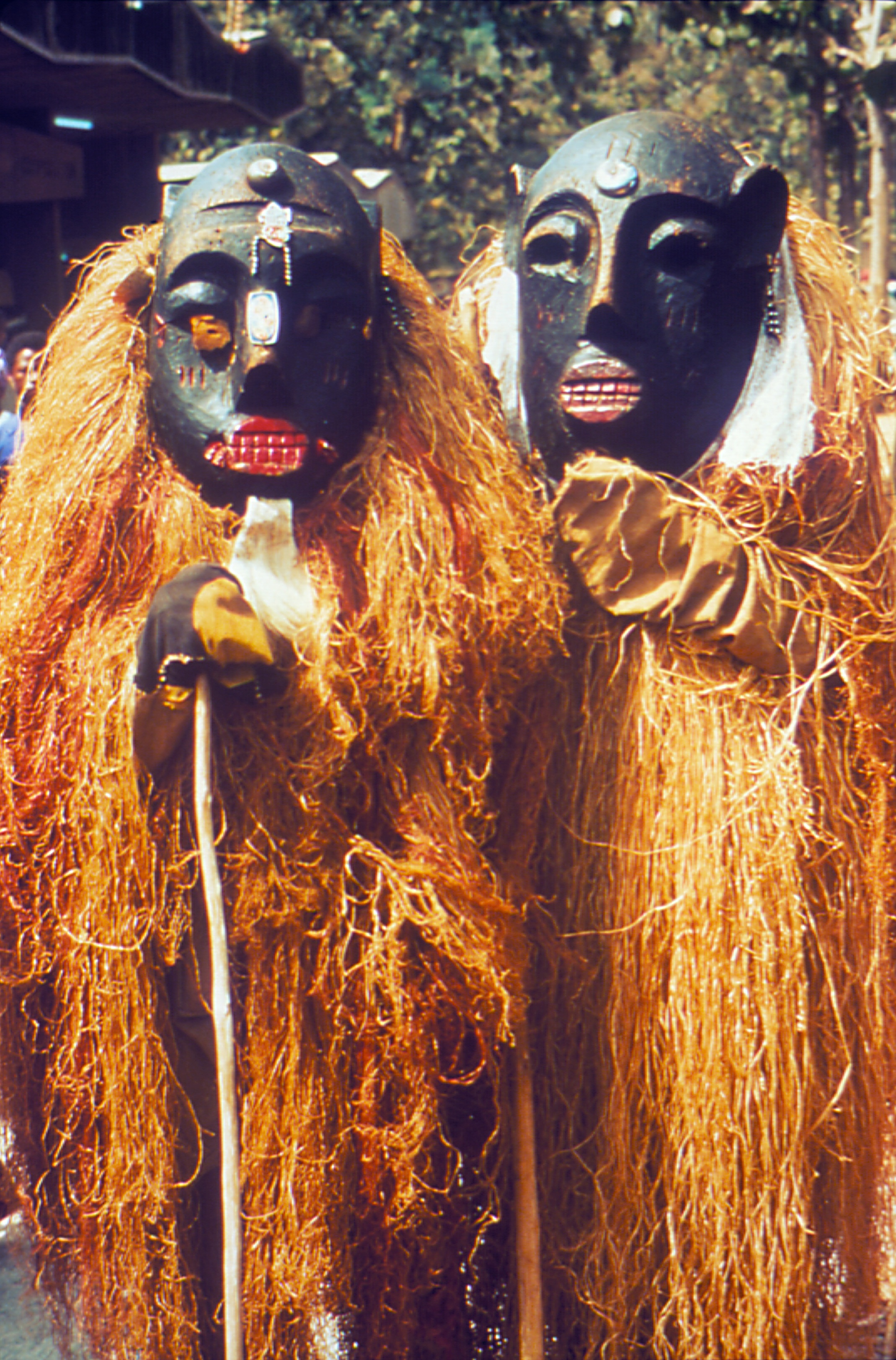
Witch doctors in Lassa, Nigeria

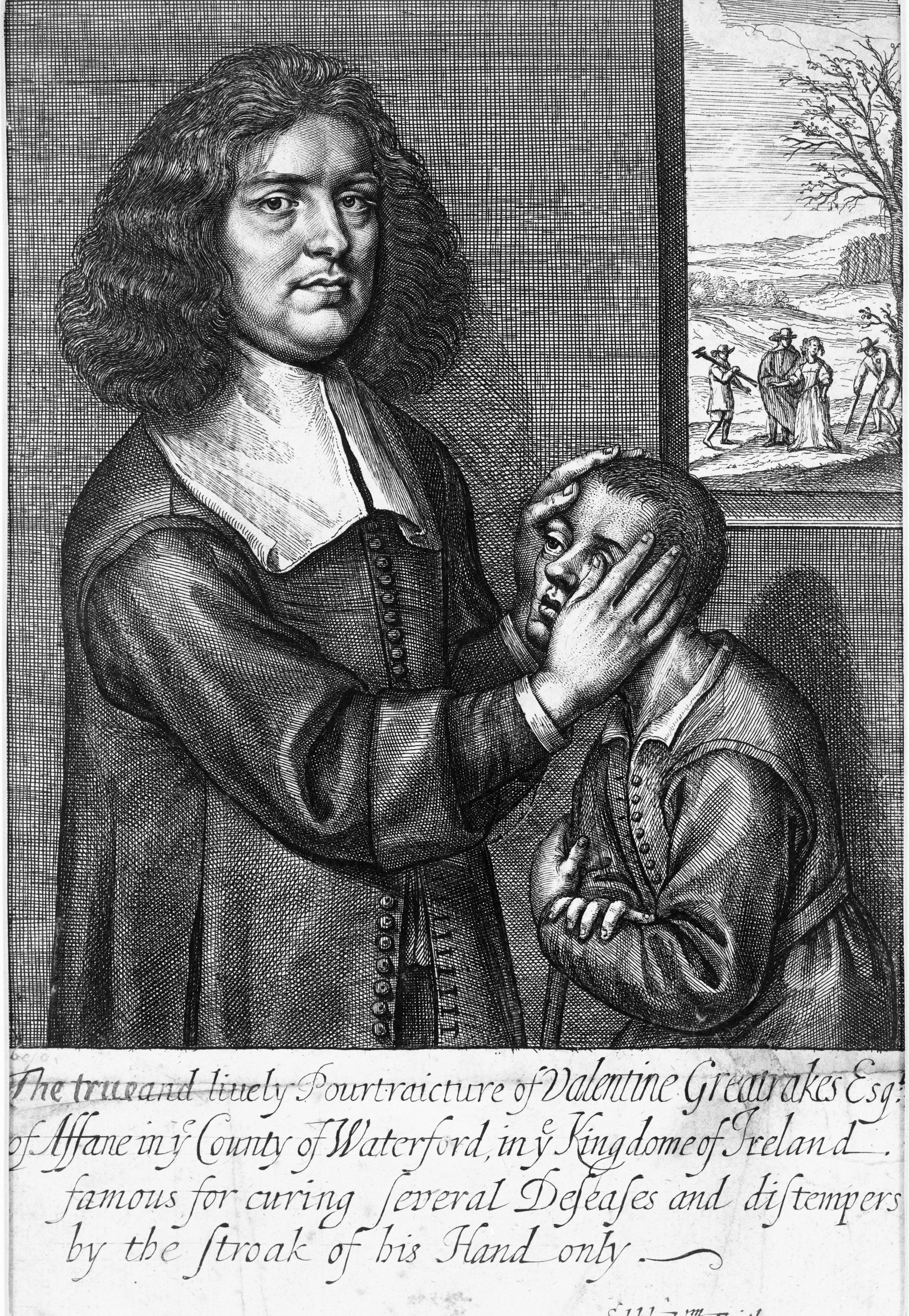
Portrait of Valentine Greatrakes exercising his power of faith healing

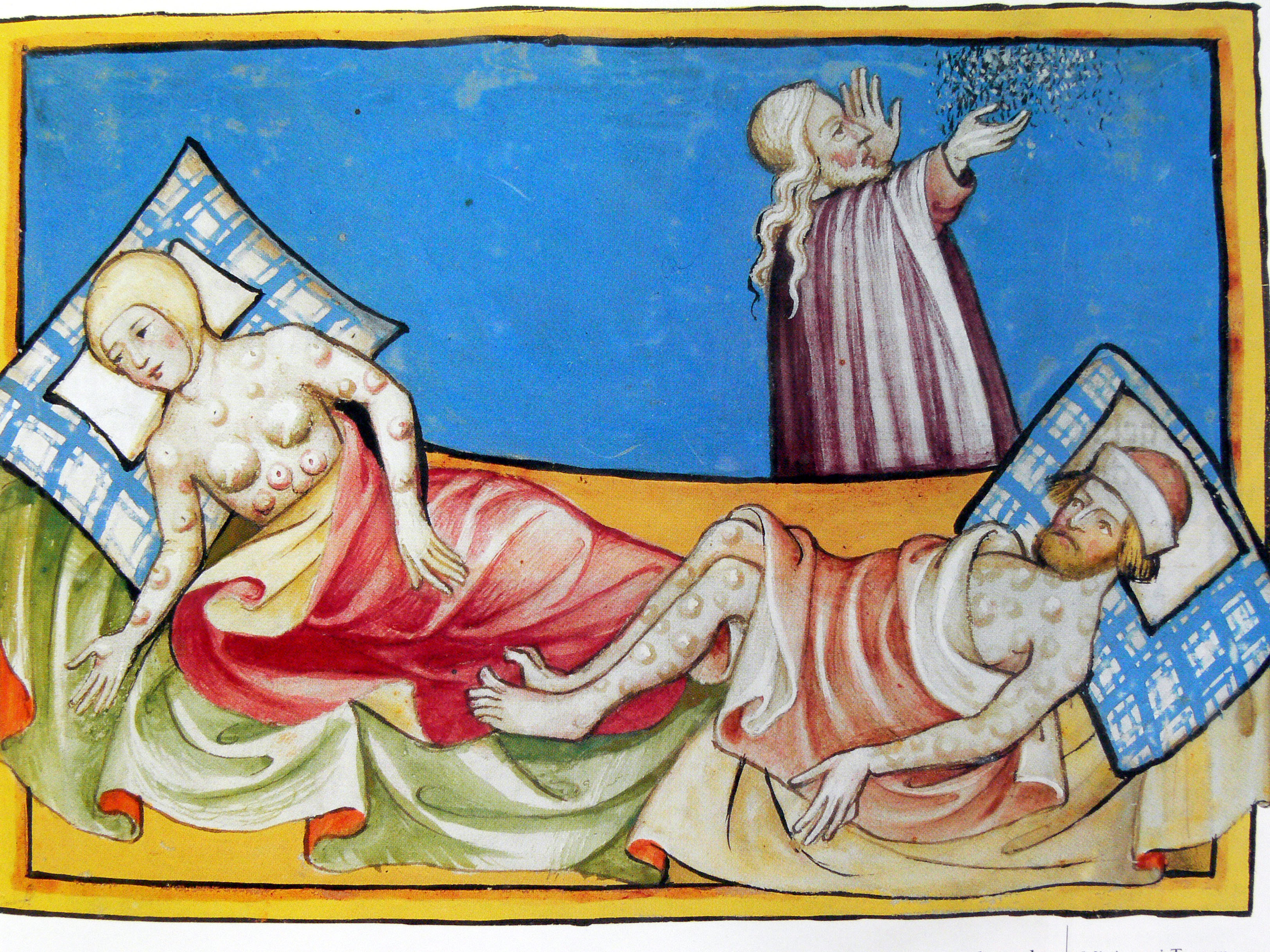
2 people suffering from the Biblical plague of boils described in Exodus 9:8-9

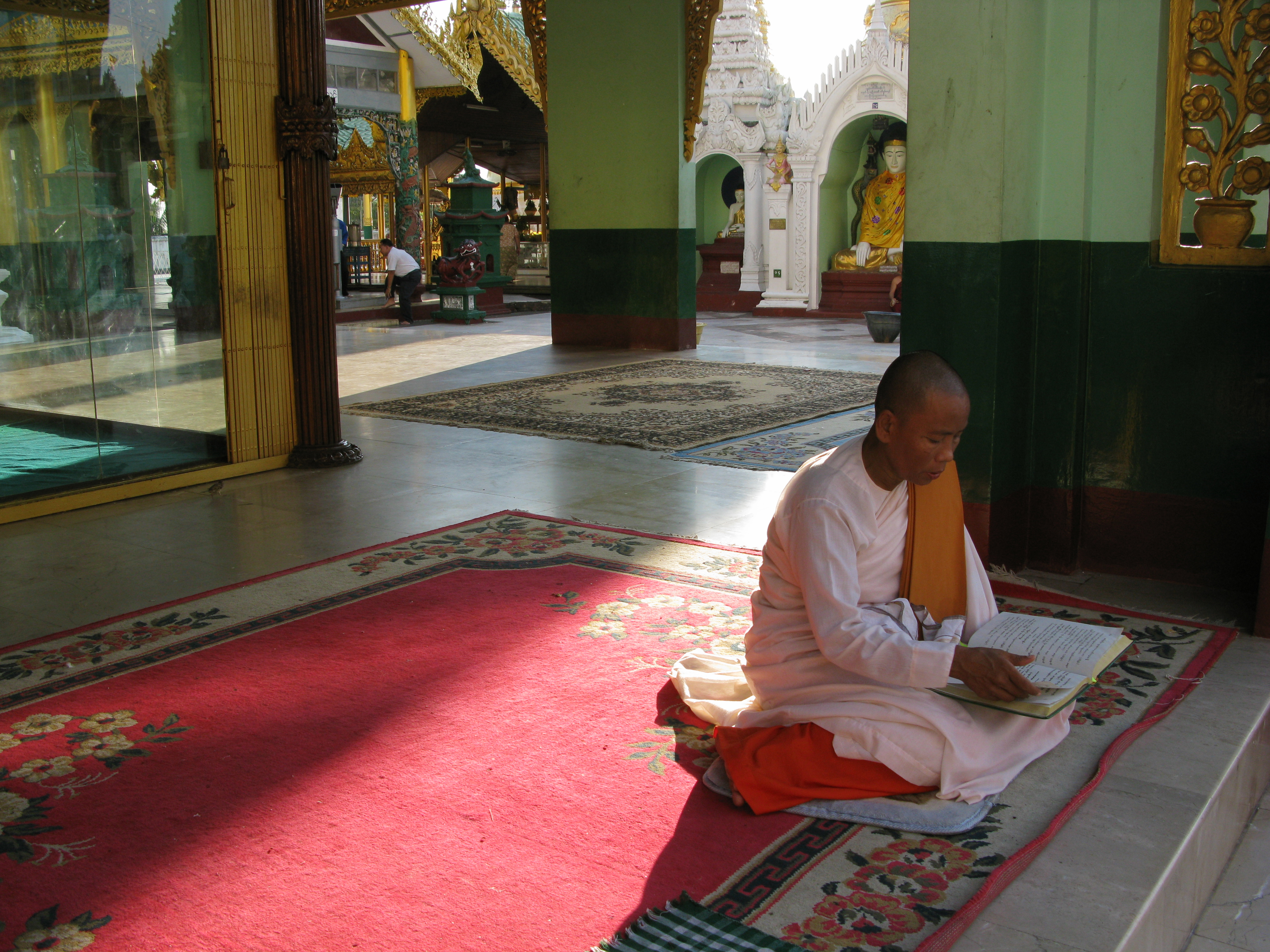
A buddhist monk meditating in Myanmar

Religion and health is an Interdisciplinary academic field that examines the relationship between religious beliefs, practices, and institutions and physical, mental, social, and spiritual health. It draws on religious studies, psychology, medicine, and public health to explore issues such as morbidity and mortality, health behaviours, coping with illness, and the organisation of health care. The World Health Organization (WHO) defines health as a state of physical, mental, and social well-being rather than just the absence of disease. Some member states and commentators have argued that this framework should clearly incorporate a spiritual dimension.

Since the late 20th century, thousands of empirical studies, dozens of meta-analyses, and over a hundred systematic reviews have examined the associations between religious or spiritual factors and health outcomes. Many observational studies indicate that higher levels of religious involvement (e.g., frequency of attendance at services or self-rated religiosity) are associated with lower mortality, lower risk of some physical and mental disorders, and better adjustment to serious illness. However, causal relationships are not certain. Explanations provided in the literature include social support, the promotion of health-related norms (such as reduced use of alcohol or tobacco), and the provision of meaning and coping resources.

Research has also documented possible negative health effects of religion. These include "religious struggle" or spiritual conflict, which has been associated with higher psychological distress and higher mortality in some studies. Health risks may also be a consequence of some ritual practices or religiously motivated refusal of biomedical treatments. Scholars and public-health bodies continue to debate the strength and interpretation of the evidence, the distinction between religion and spirituality, and the implications of this research for clinical practice and health policy.

== History ==
Many early societies had a spiritual view of illness, often seeing it as caused by spirits, demons, or the displeasure of the gods. As such, healers were often religious specialists such as priests or shamans. In Egypt, Greece, and early Christianity, care of the sick was a mix of ritual, prayer, and nascent empirical practices, rather than a strict demarcation between religion and medicine.

The Christian church was a major provider of health care in medieval Europe. Monasteries operated hospitals, clergy preserved medical texts, and religious institutions frequently licensed physicians. Care of the sick was also a religious duty in the medieval Islamic societies, combined with developments in surgery, hygiene, and hospital management.

== Scientific research ==
More than 3,000 empirical studies have examined relationships between religion and health, including more than 1,200 in the 20th century, and more than 2,000 additional studies between 2000 and 2009. Various other reviews of the religion/spirituality and health literature have been published. These include two reviews from an NIH-organized expert panel that appeared in a 4-article special section of American Psychologist. Several chapters in edited academic books have also reviewed the empirical literature. The literature has also been reviewed extensively from the perspective of public health and its various subfields ranging from health policy and management to infectious diseases and vaccinology.

More than 30 meta-analyses and 100 systematic reviews have been published on relations between religious or spiritual factors and health outcomes.

== Dimensions of health ==
The World Health Organization (WHO) discerns four dimensions of health, namely physical, social, mental, and spiritual health.

=== Physical health ===
==== Positive effects ====
According to Ellison & Levin (1998), some studies indicate that religiosity appears to positively correlate with physical health. For instance, mortality rates are lower among people who frequently attend religious events and consider themselves both religious and spiritual. According to Seybold & Hill (2001), almost all studies on the effect of religion on a person's physical health reveal a positive contribution to their lifestyle. Researchers have conducted these studies across various ages, genders, and religions. These are based on the experience that religion is positive in itself.

In the US in the 2020s, people who attend religious services less often are more responsible for an overall decline in the rate of alcohol consumption than regular attendees. This effect is partially due to the declining portion of religious individuals in the country.

One possibility is that religion provides physical health benefits indirectly. Church attendees present with lower rates of alcohol consumption and improvement in mood, which is associated with better physical health. Kenneth Pargament Is a major contributor to the theory of how individuals may use religion as a resource in coping with stress. His work seems to show the influence of attribution theory. Additional evidence suggests that this relationship between religion and physical health may be causal. Religion may reduce the likelihood of certain diseases. Studies suggest that it guards against cardiovascular disease by reducing blood pressure and also improves immune system functioning. Similar studies have been done investigating religious emotions and health. Although religious emotions, such as humility, forgiveness, and gratitude confer health benefits, it is unclear if religious people cultivate and experience those emotions more frequently than non-religious peoples.

==== Church attendance ====
In many studies, attendance at religious services has been found to be associated with lower levels of multiple risk factors for ill health and mortality and with lower prevalence and incidence of illness and mortality. For example, a recent report of a follow-up study of over five thousand Americans found those attending more than weekly had half the mortality of those never attending after adjusting for multiple variables. This can be expressed as an increase in life expectancy (Hummer et al. 1999) with a life expectancy at age 20 of 83 years for frequent attendees and 75 years for non-attendees. A causal association between a risk factor and an outcome can only be proven by a randomized controlled experiment, obviously infeasible in this case. Hence, observational findings of an association of religious attendance with lower mortality are compatible with a causal relationship but cannot prove one. Churchgoers may differ from others in ways not measured that could explain their better health.

One alternative explanation is that social activities performed in church, such as group singing, have health benefits for which a religious component is not necessary.

==== Life expectancy and death rates ====
Loma Linda, California, one of the five original Blue Zones of the world, "lives eight to 10 years longer than the average American". Its population largely holds church membership in the Seventh-day Adventist Church, which encourages Christian vegetarianism and mandates the observance of the Sabbath.

Kark et. (1996) included almost 4,000 Israelis. Over 16 years (beginning in 1970), death rates were compared between the experimental group (people belonging to 11 religious kibbutzim) and the control group (people belonging to secular kibbutzim). Some determining factors for the groups included the date the kibbutz was created, geography of the different groups, and the similarity in age. It was determined that "belonging to a religious collective was associated with a strong protective effect". Not only do religious people tend to exhibit healthier lifestyles, they also may have a strong support system that individualist secular people would not normally have. A religious community can provide support, especially through a stressful life event such as the death of a loved one or illness. There is the belief that a higher power will provide healing and strength through the rough times, which also can explain the lower mortality rate of religious people vs. secular people.

The existence of 'religious struggle' in elderly patients was predictive of a greater risk of mortality in a study by Pargament et al. (2001). Results indicate that patients, with a previously sound religious life, experienced a 19% to 28% greater mortality due to the belief that God was supposedly punishing them or abandoning them.

==== Infections ====
A number of religious practices have been reported to cause infections. These happened during an ultra-Orthodox Jewish circumcision practice known as metzitzah b'peh, the ritual 'side roll' in Hinduism, (Note: The 'side roll' is a ritual performed during a Hindu festival in which large numbers of male devotees lie prostrate on the ground and roll sideways around the temple premises in fulfilment of vows taken at the temple. Because the men's upper bodies are usually bare during this ritual, their skin comes into contact with the parasitic larvae that infest the soil or sand on the ground, resulting in the Cutaneous larva migrans (CLM) skin disease.) the Christian communion chalice, during the Islamic Hajj, and after the Muslim ritual ablution (where nasal irrigation is concerned).

==== Prayer ====
Some religions assert that praying for a sick person can positively impact their health. Meta-studies of the literature in the field have been performed showing evidence only for an absence of effect or a potentially small effect. For instance, a 2006 meta-analysis on 14 studies concluded that there is "no discernible effect," while a 2007 systemic review of intercessory prayer reported inconclusive results, noting that 7 of 17 studies had "small, but significant, effect sizes," but the review noted that the most methodologically rigorous studies failed to produce significant findings.

Randomized controlled trials of intercessory prayer have not yielded significant effects on health. These trials have compared personal, focused, committed and organized intercessory prayer with those interceding, holding some belief that they are praying to God or a god versus any other intervention. A Cochrane collaboration review of these trials concluded that 1) results were equivocal, 2) evidence does not support a recommendation either in favor or against the use of intercessory prayer and 3) any resources available for future trials should be used to investigate other questions in health research. In a case-control study done following 5,286 Californians over a 28-year period in which variables were controlled for (i.e., age, race/ethnicity, gender, and education level), participants who went to church on a frequent basis (defined as attending a religious service once a week or more) were 36% less likely to die during that period. However, this can be partly attributed to a better lifestyle since religious people tend to drink and smoke less and eat a healthier diet.

=== Mental health ===
According to a meta-analytical review, a large volume of research shows that people who are more religious and spiritual have better mental health and adapt more quickly to health problems compared to those who are less religious and spiritual.

Studies have shown that religious believers experience higher levels of "mattering to others, dignity and meaning in their lives". In those who prayed often, the association was stronger.

Religiosity has been found to mitigate the negative impact of income inequality and injustice on life satisfaction.

The link between religion and mental health may be due to the guiding framework or social support that it offers to individuals. By these routes, religion has the potential to offer security and significance in life, as well as valuable human relationships, to foster mental health. Some theorists have suggested that the benefits of religion and religiosity are accounted for by the social support afforded by membership in a religious group.

Religion may also provide coping skills to deal with stressors or demands perceived as straining. Pargament's three primary styles of religious coping are 1) self-directing, characterized by self-reliance and acknowledgement of God, 2) deferring, in which a person passively attributes responsibility to God, and 3) collaborative, which involves an active partnership between the individual and God and is most commonly associated with positive adjustment. This model of religious coping has been criticized for its over-simplicity and failure to take into account other factors, such as level of religiosity, specific religion, and type of stressor. Additional work by Pargament involves a detailed delineation of positive and negative forms of religious coping, captured in the BRIEF-RCOPE questionnaire which have been linked to a range of positive and negative psychological outcomes.

Religiosity is positively associated with mental disorders that involve an excessive amount of self-control and negatively associated with mental disorders that involve a lack of self-control. Other studies have found indications of mental health among both the religious and the secular. For instance, Vilchinsky & Kravetz found negative correlations with psychological distress among religious and secular subgroups of Jewish students. In addition, intrinsic religiosity has been inversely related to depression in the elderly, while extrinsic religiosity has no relation or even a slight positive relation to depression.

==== Depression ====
In one study, those who were assessed to have a higher spiritual quality of life on a spiritual well-being scale had fewer depressive symptoms. Cancer and AIDS patients who were more spiritual had lower depressive symptoms than religious patients. Spirituality shows beneficial effects possibly because it speaks to one's ability to intrinsically find meaning in life, strength, and inner peace, which is especially important for very ill patients.

Exline et al. (1999) showed that the difficulty in forgiving God and alienation from God were associated with higher levels of depression and anxiety. Among those who currently believed in God, forgiving God for a specific, unfortunate incident predicted lower levels of anxious and depressed mood.

==== Schizophrenia and psychosis ====
Studies have reported beneficial effects of spirituality on the lives of patients with schizophrenia, major depression, and other psychotic disorders. Schizophrenic patients were less likely to be re-hospitalized if families encouraged religious practice, and in depressed patients who underwent religiously based interventions, their symptoms improved faster than those who underwent secular interventions. Furthermore, a few cross-sectional studies have shown that more religiously involved people had fewer instances of psychosis.

==== Life satisfaction ====
Research shows that religiosity moderates the relationship between "thinking about the meaning of life" and life satisfaction. For individuals scoring low and moderately on religiosity, thinking about the meaning of life is negatively correlated with life satisfaction. For people scoring highly on religiosity, however, this relationship is positive. Religiosity has also been found to moderate the relationship between negative affect and life satisfaction, such that life satisfaction is less strongly influenced by the frequency of negative emotions in more religious (vs. less religious) individuals.

==== Coping with trauma ====
One of the most common ways that people cope with trauma is through the comfort found in religious or spiritual practices. Psychologists of religion have performed multiple studies to measure the positive and negative effects of this coping style. Leading researchers have split religious coping into two categories: positive religious coping and negative religious coping. Individuals who use positive religious coping are likely to seek spiritual support and look for meaning in a traumatic situation. Negative religious coping (or spiritual struggles) expresses conflict, questions, and doubt regarding issues of God and faith.

The effects of religious coping are measured in many different circumstances, each with different outcomes. Some common experiences where people use religious coping are fear-inflicting events such as 9/11 or the Holocaust, death and sickness, and near-death experiences. Research also shows that people also use religious coping to deal with everyday stressors in addition to life-changing traumas. The underlying assumption of the ability of religion to influence the coping process lies in the hypothesis that religion is more than a defence mechanism as it was viewed by Sigmund Freud. Rather than inspiring denial, religion stimulates reinterpretations of negative events through the sacred lens.

=== Spiritual health ===
Spiritual health is one of four dimensions of well-being as defined by the World Health Organization (WHO), along with physical, social, and mental health.

The preamble to the Constitution of the World Health Organization (WHO) adopted by the International Health Conference held in New York from 19 June to 22 July 1946 and signed on 22 July 1946 by the representatives of 61 States defined health as a state of "physical, mental and social well-being and not merely the absence of disease or infirmity" and it has not been amended.

However, in 1983, twenty-two WHO member countries from the Eastern Mediterranean Region proposed a draft resolution to this preamble to include reference to spiritual health, such that it would redefine health as a state of "physical, mental, spiritual and social well-being and not merely the absence of disease or infirmity".

While the WHO did not amend the preamble to its constitution, resolution WHA31.13 passed by the Thirty-seventh World Health Assembly in 1984 called upon Member States to consider including in their Health For All strategies a spiritual dimension as defined in that resolution in accordance with their own social and cultural patterns, recognizing that "the spiritual dimension plays a great role in motivating people's achievements in all aspects of life".

The complete description of the spiritual dimension as articulated by the Health Assembly is as follows:

The spiritual dimension is understood to imply a phenomenon that is not material in nature, but belongs to the realm of ideas, beliefs, values and ethics that have arisen in the minds and conscience of human beings, particularly ennobling ideas. Ennobling ideas have given rise to health ideals, which have led to a practical strategy for Health for All that aims at attaining a goal that has both a material and non-material component. If the material component of the strategy can be provided to people, the non-material or spiritual one is something that has to arise within people and communities in keeping with their social and cultural patterns. The spiritual dimension plays a great role in motivating people's achievement in all aspects of life.

Since the inclusion of spiritual health within WHO's purview, a number of other significant organizations have also attended to spirituality and incorporated reference to it in key documents, including the United Nations action plan Agenda 21 which recognizes the right of individuals to "healthy physical, mental, and spiritual development".

== Modern developments ==
Some religious groups prohibit the use of certain modern medical interventions with serious implications for patient care and public health. Such positions usually arise from particular interpretations of scripture or religious law and may be consistent with acceptance of many other forms of medical treatment.

Christian Science is a religion that began in the 1800s. It teaches that the best way to treat illness is through spiritual healing by prayer and discourages the use of traditional medical care. Some followers of the religion treat illness solely with religious methods, while others combine these methods with traditional medical care. Legal and ethical controversies have, however, arisen in cases where Christian Scientist parents have refused medical care for their children, and some prosecutions for neglect or manslaughter have followed deaths from otherwise treatable conditions.

Jehovah's Witnesses generally accept most aspects of modern medicine but refuse blood transfusions, including whole blood and major blood components, due to their interpretation of biblical prohibitions against consuming blood. This refusal has resulted in the creation of bloodless medicine and surgery programs in some hospitals, as well as ongoing ethical debates about respecting patient autonomy and ensuring safe, effective care, especially for minors. In 2026, the Watch Tower's policy was updated to allow members to have their own blood removed, stored, and transfused during scheduled surgeries. Also in 2026, many of the broader restrictions on blood transfusions were repealed by the religious sect; this followed many years of controversy and legal challenges – including 50,000 members' preventable deaths due to the blood policy since 1945.

== See also ==
=== General ===
- Faith community nursing
- Psychology of religion § Religion and health
- Well-being contributing factors § Religion and spirituality
- Spiritual care in health care professions
- Faith healing

=== Topical (health) ===
- Abortion
- Disability
- Divorce
- HIV/AIDS
- Homelessness
- Vaccination
- Organ donation

=== Topical (religion) ===
- Drugs
- Happiness
- Health deities
- Suicide

=== Books ===
- Handbook of Religion and Health
- Multidimensional Measurement of Religiousness/Spirituality (book)
- Psychology of Religion and Coping (book)
- Faith and Health: Psychological Perspectives

=== Journals ===
- Journal of Religion & Health
- Mental Health, Religion & Culture
- Spirituality in Clinical Practice
