= Multidimensional Measurement of Religiousness/Spirituality for Use in Health Research =

Multidimensional Measurement of Religiousness/Spirituality for Use in Health Research: A Report of the Fetzer Institute / National Institute on Aging Working Group
- Author: Fetzer Institute / National Institute on Aging Working Group
- Language: English
- Genre: Psychology, Religion, Public health
- Publisher: Fetzer Institute (Kalamazoo, MI)
- Publication date: 1999; 2003
- Pages: 95

Multidimensional Measurement of Religiousness/Spirituality for Use in Health Research is a report, originally published in 1999, by a Fetzer Institute / National Institute on Aging working group on the measurement of religion and spirituality. A revised version with a new preface was published in 2003. The book presents a series of 12 self-report questionnaire measures, each focused on a particular aspect of religiousness or spirituality, along with reviews of underlying theory and supporting research. The book's purpose is to provide validated measures of spiritual and religious factors in health research. The book includes the Brief Multidimensional Measure of Religiousness/Spirituality (BMMRS), a practical measure with selected items from the 12 previous chapters.

The book has been widely cited in health and behavioral science research, and several subsequent publications have been partially or entirely dedicated to evaluating and critiquing the measures.

== Topics covered ==
Both editions contain an introduction, followed by 12 chapters, each on the measurement of a particular aspect ("domain") of religion or spirituality. Combining all these questions gives the Multidimensional Measure of Religiousness/Spirituality. (MMRS). Concluding pages of each edition select items for a briefer 38-item version of the questionnaire (BMMRS), along with data from a US national survey that incorporated many of its items.

Background and purpose. The Introduction states the book is responding to "a growing body of literature.... indicat[ing] that various dimensions of religiousness and spirituality may enhance subjective states of well-being... lower levels of depression and psychological distress... and reduce morbidity and mortality.... elicit[ing] considerable attention from medical researchers in epidemiology, psychology, sociology, gerontology, and other fields" (p. 1). However,

Health researchers who seek to include religious or spiritual domains in their studies typically confront various problems. Few health researchers have a scholarly background in religiousness/spirituality and most are not acquainted with the long history of attempts to conceptualize and measure multiple dimensions of religiousness... [and] we currently have no widely used and validated set of standard measures for key religious/spiritual domains to recommend to interested health researchers (pp. 1-2)

Domain-Focused Chapters:
Multidimensional Measurement of Religiousness /
Spirituality for use in Health Research

Domain / Chapter Title

Sample Item

Daily Spiritual Experiences
(Lynn G. Underwood)

I find strength and comfort
in my religion.*

Meaning
(Kenneth I. Pargament)

My spirituality helps define
the goals I set for myself.

Values
(Ellen Idler)

My whole approach to life
is based on my religion.

Beliefs
(Ellen Idler)

Do you believe there is
a life after death?*

Forgiveness
(Ellen Idler)

I have forgiven those who
hurt me.

Private Religious Practices
(Jeff Levin)

How often do you pray
privately in places other than
at church or synagogue?*

Religious/Spiritual Coping
(Kenneth I. Pargament)

I think about how my life is part
of a larger spiritual force.*

Religious Support
(Neal Krause)

If you were ill, how much
would the people in your
congregation help you out?*

Religious/Spiritual History
(Linda K. George)

Did you ever have a religious
or spiritual experience that
changed your life?*

Commitment
(David R. Williams)

I try hard to carry my religious
beliefs over into all my other
dealings in life.*

Organizational Religiousness
(Ellen Idler)

How often do you go to
religious services?*

Religious Preference
(Christopher Ellison)

What is your current religious
preference?*

*These items also appeared in the BMMRS

Thus, "the NIA and the Fetzer Institute established a core working group to:

- Identify those domains of religiousness/spirituality most likely to impact health
- Suggest potential mechanisms whereby these variables might operate; and
- Provide a short multidimensional survey for use in clinical research." (p. 2)

Plausibility of health effects. The Introduction described a variety of "potential mechanisms" by which religiou/spirituality might affect health. These include "behavioral mechanisms" (e.g., less drug abuse), "social mechanisms" (e.g., community ties), "psychological mechanisms" (e.g., emotional support or religious coping), and physiological mechanisms" (e.g., prayer or meditation that elicits a "relaxation response") (pp. 3–4).

Cultural orientation. The Introduction also noted that "While many of the items have a strong Judeo-Christian focus... the group also proposed a number of items relevant to the growing proportion of Americans who engage in spiritual activities outside the content of churches and synagogues" (p. 3).

Domain-focused chapters. The titles of the 12 domain-focused chapters, each written by one of the committee members, are shown in the adjacent table. A sample question from each chapter's questionnaire measure is also shown in the table.

Brief measure. The final chapter contains a "short form" (BMMRS) with 36 items mostly drawn from the longer measures that appear in the previous 12 chapters (see table). Two additional items elicit a respondent's overall self-ranking (e.g., "To what extent to you consider yourself a spiritual person?", with a similar question about being a "religious person"). This chapter is entitled:

- Brief Multidimensional Measure of Religiousness/Spirituality: 1999

Survey data. The appendix contains results from administering the BMMRS to a US nationally representative sample, through the General Social Survey, in 1998. For example, it was found that 24.4 percent of US adults reported engaging in private prayer "more than once a day", and 9.0 percent reported engaging in meditation "more than once a day" (p. 92). The appendix is entitled:

- Appendix A: Additional Psychometric and Population Distribution Data

== Response and influence ==
By 2010, the book had been cited more than 350 times in scientific publications. Critiques and evaluations of the MMRS or BMMRS have appeared in the Journal of Nervous and Mental Disease, Research on Aging, the Journal for the Scientific Study of Religion, the International Journal for the Psychology of Religion, Journal of Religion and Health, Research in the Social Scientific Study of Religion, and elsewhere.

In the Journal of Nervous and Mental Disease, Harold G. Koenig wrote that

The Fetzer Institute’s Multidimensional Measure of Religiousness/Spirituality is rapidly becoming the standard measure of religiousness/spirituality in the spirituality and health field overall, given its comprehensive nature... There also exist national norms for the short version of this instrument (p. 352).

However, he expressed concern that some items for some of the domains of the BMMRS might be "contaminated": "Among its spirituality subscales are meaning, values, and forgiveness subscales [containing] items such as... 'Knowing that I am a part of something greater than myself gives meaning to my life'... [and] 'It is easy for me to admit that I am wrong,' ... these positive traits could very well be the outcome or the results of spirituality. However, should they be part of the definition itself?... completely secular persons and atheists may experience these things as frequently or more frequently than so called 'spiritual persons" (p. 352). Others have empirically tested this issue for the BMMRSs Daily Spiritual Experiences Scale finding that it is composed of two factors - theism and civility — with many people who eschew religion and spirituality scoring highly on civility.

In Research on Aging, Idler and other working group members reported results of in-depth analyses of data from administering the BMMRS in the 1998 General Social Survey. The various BMMRS questions "had the expected relationships with other measures of [religious] concepts. Overall, the instrument has the appropriate characteristics of reliability and validity to be used in further research." (p. 356). Another analysis of the same data suggested that the BMMRS "is useful for multiethnic research," and that the daily spirituality and values/beliefs scales could benefit by being combined (p. 446).

Several researchers evaluated how well the BMMRS appeared to work when given to different populations. One study concluded that "most BMMRS measures are reliable and valid for use among adolescents" (p. 439). Another found that the "BMMRS is a viable multifactor measure of [religion/spirituality] for use with young adults" when the "wording on some items was slightly altered to be more inclusive of various religious traditions" (pp. 106, 110). A third reported that in a sample of midwestern US college students, "despite having a collection of items from 12 different domains, these items really constitute two major areas of interest: one relating to spiritual experiences and the other to religious involvements" (p. 194). In a population of patients undergoing rehabilitation, it appears that "the BMMRS assesses distinct positive and negative aspects of religiousness and spirituality that may be best conceptualized... as... (a) Spiritual Experiences... (b) Religious Practices... (c) Congregational Support; and (d) Forgiveness" (p. 146). Findings from Southern US adults suggested that the MMRS appears best at measuring "3 primary factors (Meaning, Spirituality, Religious Practices and Organized Religiousness) and 2 secondary factors (Guilt vs. God’s Grace, and Loving/Forgiving God)" (p. 181).

John Traphagan, in Research on Aging, examined how the book can "raise questions about the extent to which basic ideas associated with the study of Judeo-Christian religions are meaningful in contexts such as Japan" and other Asian countries (p. 387). He argued that questions suggested for many of the 12 domains are irrelevant to understanding religiousness/spirituality in Japan. However, a few MMRS domains held promise. For example, with regard to religious coping, he stated that "certain kinds of ritual performance in Japan can be understood in terms of coping mechanisms, and this is an area identified in the Fetzer report that holds promise for cross-cultural research (at least in relation to Japan)" (p. 405).

According to the book's 2003 preface, the Fetzer Institute continues to receive requests for the booklet, and at that time had distributed 2,000 print copies and 1200 internet downloads. The preface reports that "the most popular subscales being used are the Religious/Spiritual Coping and the Daily Spiritual Experiences Scales (DSES). One fourth of respondents have used the booklet in either a course that they teach, in a seminar, or in a symposium." (p. ii)

== Editions ==
Fetzer Institute published the original paperbound edition in 1999, and published a paperbound "reprint" in 2003 that contained a new preface. The 2003 edition is also available for downloading without charge from the Fetzer Institute website (see external links). The two editions are:

- Fetzer Institute / National Institute on Aging Working Group (1999). Multidimensional Measurement of Religiousness/Spirituality for Use in Health Research: A Report of the Fetzer Institute / National Institute on Aging Working Group (1st ed.). Kalamazoo, MI, USA: Fetzer Institute. (95 pages)
- Fetzer Institute / National Institute on Aging Working Group (2003). Multidimensional Measurement of Religiousness/Spirituality for Use in Health Research: A Report of the Fetzer Institute / National Institute on Aging Working Group (2nd ed.). Kalamazoo, MI, USA: Fetzer Institute. (95 pages)

- With a new preface (p. ii), and additional information on the DSES, a measure of daily spiritual experiences (p. 17)

One of the scales, the DSES, has been translated into multiple foreign (non-English) languages: Mandarin Chinese, Korean, German, Greek, Vietnamese, French and Spanish (p. 716).

== See also ==
- Handbook of Religion and Health
- Psychology of Religion and Coping (book)
- Faith and Health: Psychological Perspectives
