= Faith and Health =

2001 book edited by Thomas G. Plante and Allen C. Sherman

Faith and Health: Psychological Perspectives
- Author: Thomas G. Plante and Allen C. Sherman
- Language: English
- Genre: Psychology
- Publisher: Guilford
- Publication date: 2001
- Publication place: United States
- Pages: 406
- ISBN: 1-57230-682-3
- OCLC: 47625366

Faith and Health: Psychological Perspectives is a book of scientific psychology on the relationship between religious faith and health. Edited by Thomas G. Plante and Allen C. Sherman, the book was published in the United States in 2001.

The book includes 16 chapters divided among four major parts that focus on general population outcomes (such as impacts on longevity), outcomes in special populations such as medical patients or adolescents, clinical implications, and overall criticisms and reflections.

Faith and Health has been reviewed in several professional journals, including Contemporary Psychology, Journal of Nervous and Mental Disease, and others.

== Topics Covered ==
Faith and Health contains 16 chapters written by various psychological or biomedical researchers, and some of them are notable. Chapter titles and authors are listed in the table (below, at right). After an introductory chapter, the remaining 15 chapters are divided into four major parts.

The book's first part focuses on the faith/health relation in the general population. Chapter 2 by Carl E. Thoresen and his colleagues describes the existing empirical evidence, and discusses many methodological issues. The authors view the evidence as indicating that religious/spiritual factors "appear to be associated with physical, mental, and overall health, but the lack of adequate controls and designs in many studies has seriously limited our understanding of these relationships." The authors also note methodological challenges related to the need for more studies that follow participants over time, rather than observing them only once; the need to recognize that if religion and spirituality operate through other factors, they may be very influential but remain unrecognized, because they do not explain unique variance; and the need for more experimental studies. The authors also present a "working model... that tries to capture several factors that may be involved in the pathways connecting [religious/spiritual] factors with health," and highlight four studies that investigated religion/spirituality and health relationships using "state-of-the-art epidemiological designs"

	Chapter Title	Author(s)
1.	Research on faith and health: New approaches to old questions	Thomas G. Plante and Allen C. Sherman
Part I: Faith and Health in the General Population: Research and Theory
2.	Spirituality, religion, and health: Evidence, issues, and concerns	Carl E. Thoresen, Alex H. S. Harris, and Doug Oman
3.	Religious involvement and mortality: Answers and more questions	Michael McCullough
4.	Religious involvement and health outcomes in late adulthood: Findings from a longitudinal study of women and men	Paul Wink and Michele Dillon
5.	Unforgiveness, forgiveness, religion, and health	Everett L. Worthington, Jr., Jack W. Berry, and Les Parrott III
6.	Assessment of religiousness and spirituality in health research	Allen C. Sherman and Stephanie Simonton
Part II: Faith and health in special populations
7.	Religious involvement among cancer patients: Associations with adjustment and quality of life	Allen C. Sherman and Stephanie Simonton
8.	Religion and health in HIV/AIDS communities	R. Corey Remle and Harold G. Koenig
9.	Tobacco and alcohol use among young adults: Exploring religious faith, locus of health control, and coping strategies as predictors	A. Sandra Willis, Kenneth A. Wallston, and Kamau R. S. Johnson
10.	Religious faith and mental health outcomes	Thomas G. Plante and Naveen K. Sharma
Part III: Faith and health in the clinic
11.	Assessing religious and spiritual concerns in psychotherapy	John T. Chirban
12.	Spiritual interventions in healing and wholeness	Siang-Yang Tan and Natalie J. Dong
13.	The religious dimension of patient care within rehabilitation medicine: The role of religious attitudes, beliefs, and professional practices	Edward P. Shafranske
Part IV: Commentaries and research concerning faith and health
14.	Without a prayer: Methodological problems, ethical challenges, and misrepresentations in the study of religion, spirituality, and medicine	Richard P. Sloan, Emilia Bagiella, and Tia Powell
15.	Religion and spirituality in the science and practice of health psychology: Openness, skepticism, and the agnosticism of methodology	Timothy W. Smith
16.	Conclusions and future directions for research on faith and health	Allen C. Sherman and Thomas G. Plante

In chapter 3, Michael McCullough reviewed evidence for relations between religious involvement and mortality. McCullough describes results of a meta-analysis of 42 independent estimates of the association between religious involvement and length of life, reporting that "religious people had, on average, 29% higher odds of survival during any follow-up period than did less religious people" Other chapters looked at religion and health in late adulthood, and at the role of forgiveness and unforgiveness. A final chapter discussed how religiousness and spirituality is assessed in health research.

The second part focuses on faith and health in special populations. These include adolescents who are at risk for abusing tobacco and alcohol, as well as those with cancer or HIV/AIDS. The section also discusses how religious faith is related to mental health outcomes, such as well-being, depression, anxiety, substance abuse, eating disorders, schizophrenia, and bipolar disorders. It concluded that "Most research examining the relationship between religion and spirituality and mental health outcomes shows positive associations."

Part three addresses implications of the faith/health relationships for the clinic. Chapters discuss implications for psychotherapy, rehabilitation medicine. A chapter by Tan and Dong offers dangers and guidelines for implementing spiritually-informed interventions that may include components such as meditation, forgiveness, prayer, solitude, the laying on of hands, fellowship, and worship, observing that "as health care providers implement religiously or spiritually oriented interventions, it is crucial that they do so with the utmost ethical caution and professional care."

The fourth part contains commentaries on the previous chapters and on the literature. Timothy Smith wrote that "it is clear that matters of religion and spirituality are relevant to each of the foci of health psychology... [and] the emergence of this topic [of faith and health] seems long overdue." He also cautioned that many results are "preliminary." A chapter by Richard Sloan and his colleagues argued that no compelling evidence links religion and health, and that "concerns of patients about religion and health are best addressed by clergy, to whom referrals can readily be made." A concluding chapter by the editors argued that

The interface between religion, spirituality, and health is an extraordinarily rich area for scientific investigation. For many, a concern with the sacred or transcendent goes to the heart of what it means to be human. Health professionals are beginning to appreciate the possibility that spiritual commitment may have relevance beyond the pew and the pulpit... I. the quest [to understand these issues] should be an exciting and provocative one.

The book also contains a 14-page index.

== Reviews and influence ==
Reviews have appeared in Contemporary Psychology, the Journal of Nervous and Mental Disease, Families, Systems, & Health, and the Journal of Health Psychology.

In Contemporary Psychology, Richards and O'Grady wrote that "Faith and Health takes us well beyond Freud's, Watson's, Skinner's, and Ellis's oversimplified, negative views of religion and spirituality... [and] sets a high standard of methodological rigor, openness, and balance."

In the Journal of Nervous and Mental Disease, Boehnlein wrote that the editors' "primary focus, and stated goal, is to assess what is known about the relationship between health outcomes and faith [and they] are largely successful in achieving this goal. " He also wrote that because it reviews so much quantitative research, the book is geared more towards researchers than towards clinicians, although there are a few chapters devoted to psychotherapy and rehabilitation.

In Families, Systems, & Health, King wrote that their "numerous publications" attest to the editors' expertise in faith/health relations, and that the book is a "comprehensive look at research." He wrote that he found "the book very useful and will use it in both my practice and teaching... I plan to add a section on couples and health to my couples therapy class—an omission I recognized upon reading this informative book."

In the Journal of Health Psychology, Martin wrote that the book was "an unusually cohesive collection of chapters that reviews current research endeavors, recent findings and critical controversies in this rapidly changing field," and would make a "very nice text for a graduate-level seminar." Three "admirable" strengths include representative contributions by top researchers, a section on clinical application, and two solid methodological critiques that "lay out a framework for addressing problems that, left dormant, would fatally harm the discipline." Martin stated that one weakness was a lack of clear delineation of how definitions of spirituality and religion in particular chapters "overlap (or fail to) with similar definitions" of the constructs in other chapters. Another weakness was a lack of large-scale theoretical frameworks, although two chapters (2 and 5) provide "insightful discussion and examples of how [theoretical modeling] might be approached."

The published book also contained praise for the book by Norman Anderson, Kenneth I. Pargament, David M. Wulff, and Peter Salovey.

== See also ==
- Handbook of Religion and Health
- Contemplative Practices in Action
- Multidimensional Measurement of Religiousness/Spirituality for Use in Health Research
