= Handbook of Religion and Health =

2001 book

- Author: Harold G. Koenig, Michael E. McCullough & David B. Larson
- Language: English
- Publisher: Oxford Univ. Press
- Publication date: 2001
- Pages: 712
- ISBN: 978-0-19-511866-7

Handbook of Religion and Health is a scholarly book about the relation of spirituality and religion with physical and mental health. Written by Harold G. Koenig, Michael E. McCullough, and David B. Larson, the first edition was published in the United States in 2001. Subsequent editions in 2012 and 2023 provide entirely new content as each edition reviews researched published since the previous edition. The book has been discussed in magazines and reviewed in professional journals.

== Topics covered ==
The first edition of the Handbook of Religion and Health (published in 2001) is divided into 8 major parts that contain a total of 34 chapters. The book also contains an 11-page introduction, a 2-page conclusion, 95 pages of references, and a 24-page index. One reviewer described the book as "surprisingly readable" (p. 791).

The parts and chapters are shown in the adjacent table. Most chapters focus on reviewing and discussing the relation between religion and particular health outcomes, such as cardiovascular disease or depression. In two chapters, the authors present more encompassing theoretical models that they suggest may explain the generally favorable associations observed between religion and health:

- In chapter 15, on mental health, the authors theorize that the relation between religion and mental health outcomes may be mediated (causally explained) by stressful life experiences, as well as various other psychological factors that include coping resources and future goals.
- In chapter 25, on physical health, the authors theorize that the religion / physical health relation may be mediated (causally explained) by mental health, social support, and health behaviors, which in turn may affect various physiological processes as well as disease detection and treatment compliance, which affect physical health.

The authors note that their model for effects on physical health

does not consider 'supernatural'... explanations... since such mechanisms (if they exist at all) act outside the laws of science as we know them today. We focus here on known psychological, social, behavioral, and physiological mechanisms by which religion may exert effects on physical health. (p. 389)

The book's 34th and final chapter contains a 77-page table with systematic information about all 20th-century studies of religion and health. Topics are arranged in the order of the other chapters, and provide technical information such as the type of population, the number of subjects, the existence of a control or a comparison group, and a 1-to-10 rating or "grade" of the study's quality and rigor. The "reader thus gains a snapshot view of each study, can easily identify those with a variable of interest, and can reference back to the text to see what the authors have to say about it" (p. 139).

== Reviews and response ==
Reviews and discussions have appeared in The New Yorker, Freethought Today, First Things, Journal of the American Medical Association, The Gerontologist, the Journal of Epidemiology and Community Health, Journal for the Scientific Study of Religion, The International Journal for the Psychology of Religion, Journal of Hospice & Palliative Nursing, Journal of Sex Education & Therapy, Anglican Theological Review, the American Journal of Psychiatry, and elsewhere.

The Journal of the American Medical Association wrote that the authors of the Handbook of Religion and Health are

well-regarded researchers in this maturing field... Their analysis of more than 1200 studies and 400 reviews is meticulous and balanced.... This is an unparalleled resource not only for physicians with an interest in the relationship between religion and health but perhaps even more for those who doubt its significance. All physicians should consider the possibility that something so meaningful to a large number of patients might also be good for their health. (pp. 465-6)

JAMA also stated that "Studies are cited to illustrate the complexity and limitations of available knowledge," that "The authors offer theoretical models for how religion might directly or indirectly influence both mental and physical health," and that "The authors provide an outline for a religious history that can serve as part of a clinical assessment. Ways to aid patients to use their religious beliefs within the health care system are suggested" (all p. 465).

In the Journal of Epidemiology and Community Health, Leonard Duhl wrote that

the authors have done a very thorough overview of all we know at this time. Clearly spirituality and religion affect growth and development, the creation of pathology and the treatment of disease. They have not got the total answer. However, they have laid a ground work for understanding a complex set of issues. They review those studies that exist, critically interpret their findings, and offer new ways of "asking the question." They hypothesise the possible mechanisms, and suggest new directions. (p. 688)

In The Gerontologist, David O. Moberg described the book as "mind-boggling, comprehensive, and evenhanded...This comprehensive reference work deserves an honored place in every medical, religious, gerontological, professional, and scientific research library, even though it has one major weakness, the lack of an index of names." (pp. 699–700;)

In The New Yorker, Jerome Groopman wrote that the Handbook's conclusions

are not entirely encouraging: they suggest that although the relationship between health and spirituality is clearly worthy of serious study, much of the research done in the field to date has been shoddy. Koenig and his collaborators also go to great lengths to educate the reader about negative effects of belief and orthodoxies... such as the fear that disease is punishment for sin, and that assistance is preferably derived through miracles rather than through medicine. (p. 166)

Freethought Today, a magazine published by the Freedom From Religion Foundation, wrote that the Handbook "reports that there are at least 1200 studies on religion and health - with the vast majority showing positive associations" and asked

Are there really this many studies? What are these studies like? Well, here's one of them that qualifies by Koenig's standards.... The authors reported differences between Jewish and non-Jewish Cleveland attorneys in the incidence of some index of cardiovascular disease. That's it.... So that's how numbers like 1200 arise, because studies like this get included. (pp. 10-11)

In the Journal for the Scientific Study of Religion, Thomas G. Plante wrote that

A growing number of well-conceived and methodologically rigorous studies have been conducted to examine if religious beliefs and behaviors might be related to health benefits or health risks.... No book, however, has [until now] thoroughly reviewed all the empirical studies and reviews in this area.... The authors maintain scholarly neutrality and let the research evidence speak for itself.... The book is surprisingly readable for a 700+ page scholarly review.... The authors should be commended on an extraordinary job on this soon to be classic text.(pp. 790-1)

In the American Journal of Psychiatry, Paul Genova wrote that "This Handbook is really a reference volume.... Case presentations are rare. Occasional sensitive discussions on subjects such as the adjustment to terminal cancer... are embedded in exhaustive literature reviews." But

the biggest problem, in my view, with the line of reasoning represented by this book [is that] "Health" is the ego's agenda. It should not be conflated with concepts such as doing God's will or taking one's proper place in a divine pattern.... A cultural product of present-day American behavioral science, this book renders unto the Caesar of controlled studies.... it fits the current pattern of assimilation and loses the Spirit of the message. (pp. 1619-20)

In the Anglican Theological Review, Daniel Grossoehme, "a priest serving as a pediatric chaplain" (p. 800), wrote that

now more than ever there is a need for religion and science (and specifically health science) to be in conversation with one another.... This volume is a significant contribution to the conversation and one which can be of great value in a variety of church settings.... The information contained in this volume provides the background necessary to carry on an education program that is both theologically and intellectually (scientifically) sound.... Guidance for previously unthought-of pastoral issues comes out from the studies. (p. 798)

In The International Journal for the Psychology of Religion, James W. Jones noted that "Like most medical texts, it is organized by syndromes" (p. 95), and that "the book’s clear organization" makes "selectively [reading] the chapters of interest... easy to do" p. 96). He also stated that

I have used this book successfully as part of the assigned readings in undergraduate, graduate, and postgraduate courses on religion and health.... [it] is accessible to educated nonprofessionals as well as professionals in religion and medicine.... It is not, however, an introduction to the controversy surrounding the field. The authors do not explicitly argue for the religion–health relation; they are content to let the weight of evidence as they present it speak for itself.... For a more critical discussion, the reader must look to other sources. But anyone planning a course or introducing a colleague to the general field of religion and health should make this book available. (pp. 95-6)

First Things wrote that "The authors write in the desiccated tone of the social scientist who divorces his thought from the human encounter with the transcendent.... Nowhere in this tome does one find a statement (let alone any enthusiastic support for) the authentic place of religion in our being" (p. 56).

The Journal of Hospice & Palliative Nursing wrote that the authors "take on a Herculean task," and "every time I randomly opened to a page, I found something unanticipated and intriguing" (pp. 138, 139).

The Journal of Sex Education & Therapy wrote that

This is a dip-and-dig book.... I spent a week just leafing through to savor the gems.... One day I read about depression... another delinquency, then cardiovascular disease... I spent a weekend on research methods and measurement tools and another weekend on priorities for future research. Yum. If you are looking for a doctoral project or an advisor, here is the place for you to dip and-dig. (p. 365)

== Editions ==
This article describes the first edition of the Handbook of Religion and Health, published in 2001, and written by Koenig, McCullough, and Larson. A second revised edition, written by Koenig, King, and Carson, was published in 2012. A third edition has been published in 2023.

== See also ==
- Multidimensional Measurement of Religiousness/Spirituality for Use in Health Research (1999 book)
- Faith and Health: Psychological Perspectives (2001 book)
- Psychology of Religion and Coping (book) (1997)
- Relationship between religion and science
