= Healthcare chaplaincy =

Curricular development in health care

Healthcare chaplaincy is the provision of pastoral care, spiritual care, or chaplaincy services in healthcare settings, such as hospitals, hospices, or home cares. Healthcare chaplains help patients, families, and caregivers draw on their spiritual, religious, and cultural beliefs to help them cope with that they are going through in these medical settings. Chaplains typically have a masters degree and training specific to chaplaincy, sometimes including being board certified.

The role of spirituality in health care has received significant research attention due to its benefits for patients and health care professionals. Integrating spirituality in healthcare can enhance healthcare professionals' ability to communicate effectively with patients and families. It can also have a positive impact on the health and well-being of patients due to its potential to enhance patients' ability to cope with illness and achieve better physical and mental health outcomes. As per 2014, more than 70 medical schools in the United States offer courses on spirituality and medicine. The Association of American Medical Colleges has co-sponsored, with the National Institute for Healthcare Research, four conferences, on curricular development in spirituality and medicine since 1997.

== Spiritual assessment ==
Spirituality is defined as "the aspect of humanity that refers to the way individuals seek and express meaning and purpose and the way they experience their connectedness to the moment, to self, to others, to nature, and to the significant or sacred". Spirituality in human society can be found in secular and religious contexts. In a secular context, spirituality is the search for meaning and purpose in life, while in a religious context it is an institutionally determined approach to faith. Understanding spiritual concerns are particularly important when caring for patients at end of life and assisting families through bereavement. Spirituality can provide patients with a path to finding meaning in their life in the face of disease and death.

The spiritual beliefs of the patients play an integral role in the patient's ability to cope with their sufferings. The hospital's atmosphere is characterised by diverse emotions, and these emotions are influenced by spiritual and cultural beliefs. Understanding the spirituality of patients allows physicians to know the patient, their ability to cope with the illness and the healing process. Asking patients questions about the meaning of life, their acceptance of their own or others' failures, and how they experience connectedness with others should have the goal of assessing how satisfied the patient is with the answers to these questions. Patients go through numerous questions during illness and spirituality helps them recognize there is a purpose and power beyond human understanding which allows them to go through painful and catastrophic circumstances with ease. Encouraging the expression of emotion and grief is identified as the best approach to spiritual communication in a hospital setting as it allows to build strong rapport with the patient and family By developing personal relationships with their patients and their families, health professionals can better assess patients' spiritual situation. Creating a space to express the spiritual beliefs and values of the family is identified to be highly beneficial to encourage meaning-based coping in patients and their families. There are several ways through which spiritual care can be implemented in hospitals. Five ways to implement spiritual care in health care are discussed here. They are:

1. Assessing the spiritual needs of patients and families:
  Open-ended questions, observations and assessment tools can be used to assess the spiritual needs of patients and families. Some examples of opening questions in a spiritual assessment are as follows:
  - "Do you have a religious preference?"
  - "Are there any spiritual or religious practices that are important to you?"
  - "Would you like for us to contact your clergy member or religious advisor?".
2. Integrating spiritual care into the overall care plan:
  The spiritual needs of the patients need to be evaluated by the healthcare provider and incorporate into the patient's care plan.
3. Access to spiritual resources:
  Patients and families need to be provided access to spiritual resources including spiritual leaders, chaplains, and religious texts.
4. Providing patients the opportunity to express their spiritual beliefs and practices:
  The spiritual beliefs and practices of the patients need to be listened to, respected and incorporated into their care.
5. Collaborating with spiritual leaders and communities:
  Support from spiritual leaders and communities can be obtained for better health care and to provide spiritual support to patients and their families.

== Role of spirituality in illness ==
The prospect of death may lead a patient to deal with questions related to meaning of life, such as "Why is this happening to me?" or "Is there a God?" The positive effect of meditation, faith, prayer or religious practice on the patient’s reported health and well-being is well established. Discussion of the spiritual topic with the patients and families in their grief can enhance information exchange about the preferences, ongoing concerns and strategies to support the patient and their family.

== Self-care ==
Li and Shun (2016) focused on self care coping styles in patients with chronic heart failure found that spiritual and religious support affects heart failure patients coping with both physical and psychological self-care.

== Applications in health care ==
There are three main applications for chaplains in healthcare. Firstly, they can help build trust in the medical plan and aid in healthcare decision-making. Sometimes this means discussing how spiritual beliefs align with the care plan, either with the patient or with the patient’s family if the patient is incapacitated. For example, a chaplain may help a family decide whether to sign a DNR. The clinical tool developed by Arthur Kleinman is an effective practical tool to understand the spiritual belief system of a patient, obtain insights about the patient's understanding of their own illness to provide spiritual support for patients.

Secondly, the application of spirituality in healthcare enable healthcare professionals to provide compassionate and holistic care for patients. Integrating the spiritual dimension in healthcare decision-making is identified to have resulted in better treatment decisions including less aggressive interventions, fewer ICU deaths and greater hospice utilisation. When spirituality is applied in healthcare decision-making, it promotes centralised healing through shared goals of patients and clinicians thereby achieving better health outcomes. The positive effects of the application of spiritual care for patients are better coping for patients and enhanced recovery from illnesses and surgery. Despite the positive impact of spirituality on both patients and healthcare professionals, its application in healthcare is still limited. One major challenge in the application of spirituality in healthcare is the diverse spiritual practice and beliefs that are unique to each person.

Thirdly, spirituality can effectively be applied to alleviate burnout symptoms in health care professionals. Healthcare professionals with spiritual and religious beliefs have lower levels of exhaustion, burnout and depersonalisation.

=== Third-party professional aid ===
Ill individuals and their families may request referrals for services such as a chaplain, psychologist, or social worker who can address their spiritual concerns. Integrative medicine includes the dimension of spirituality in understanding the health and healing of patients. This is because the integrative model recognizes the human body’s innate ability to heal as the patient is treated as a whole by understanding the link between mind, body and spirit. Providers who are uncomfortable accommodating an integrative approach to care should consult with other practitioners skilled in providing spiritual care, so that patients can integrate spiritual support into their own self-care. The results showed that spiritual intelligence training had a positive effect on nurses’ competence in spiritual care. Also, 89% of the nurses who participated in the study had not been given any prior education regarding spiritual care. Nurses considered barriers to spiritual care including inadequate staff, cultural differences, high workload and lack of education on this subject. The development of spiritual care provided by nurses can result in various outcomes such as increased satisfaction with care in patients, reduced anxiety and symptoms of depression during hospitalization, reduced length of hospitalization and, in general, improved quality of life.

== Spiritual self-care among health care professionals ==
The role of spiritual self-care for healthcare professionals has received limited attention as the core of the healthcare profession is the commitment to patient care. The healthcare professional's ability to effectively manage the pressure and demands of their profession influences the quality of patient-centred care. Spiritual self-care is a beneficial coping strategy for health care professionals who navigate through an extremely difficult and demanding work environment. As people who accompany patients experience pain and distress, health care professionals can benefit from spirituality and provide care, empathy and compassion by understanding that there is meaning and purpose beyond suffering, disease, and pain which helps health care professionals to continue their task of caring. Spirituality facilitates adaptation and coping in health care professionals highly vulnerable to burnout and compassion fatigue due to the stresses of their profession.

== Criticism ==
The definition of "spirituality" as commonly given in healthcare chaplaincy has been criticised. Salander and Hamberg question the usefulness of Puchalsky's definition:

A prerequisite for a meaningful concept is that it is demarcated in relation to other concepts. Puchalski and colleagues' conceptualization of spirituality lacks this demarcation – it unfortunately qualifies as an example of what Sartori called "conceptual stretching." It becomes a popular catch-all term – it means everything and, therefore, nothing.

== See also ==
- Religion and health
- Well-being contributing factors: religion and spirituality
- Spirituality and homelessness
