= Contemplative Practices in Action =

2010 book

Contemplative Practices in Action: Spirituality, Meditation, and Health
- Author: Thomas G. Plante (ed.), Huston Smith (foreword)
- Language: English
- Genre: medicine, religion, psychology
- Publisher: Praeger
- Publication date: 2010
- Publication place: United States
- Pages: 245
- ISBN: 978-0-313-38256-7
- OCLC: 529295626

Contemplative Practices in Action: Spirituality, Meditation, and Health is an interdisciplinary scholarly and scientific book. It examines the nature, function, and impact of meditation and other contemplative practices in several different religious traditions, both eastern and western, including methods for incorporating contemplative practice into education, healthcare, and other human services. Edited by Thomas G. Plante and with a foreword by Huston Smith, the book was published in the United States by Prager in 2010. The book reviews evidences for health effects and includes 14 chapters divided among three major parts that focus on well-defined systems of practice, traditions as storehouses of many alternative forms of practice, and applications. It has been reviewed in several professional journals, including PsycCRITIQUES, and the Journal of Psychosocial Research,.

== Topics covered ==
The book contains 14 chapters written by scholars in the health and behavioral sciences and religious studies. Chapter titles and authors are listed in the table (below, at right). Huston Smith's foreword describes the book as "ecumenically inclusive," "in line" with Smith's own work. The editor's introductory chapter notes an increasing usage of meditative practices in health and human service practice, along with an increasing evidence base. It also acknowledges "a number of books" available on contemplative practices, but expresses concern that

	Chapter Title	Author(s)
	Foreword	Huston Smith
1.	Introduction: contemplative practices in action	Thomas G. Plante, Adi Raz, & Doug Oman
Part I: Integrative Contemplative Practice Systems
2.	Similarity in diversity: four shared functions of contemplative practice systems	Doug Oman
3.	Managing stress mindfully	Hooria Jazaieri & Shauna Shapiro
4.	Translating spiritual ideals into daily life: the eight point program of passage meditation	Tim Flinders, Doug Oman, Carol Lee Flinders, & Diane Dreher
5.	Centering prayer: a method of Christian meditation for our time	Jane Ferguson
6.	Mantram repetition: a "portable contemplative practice" for modern times	Jill Bormann
Part II: Contemplative Traditions
7.	The eternal is with me, I shall not fear: Jewish contemplative practices and well-being	Zari Weiss & David Levy
8.	A comprehensive contemplative approach from the Islamic tradition	Aisha Hamdan
9.	The path of yoga	T. Anne Richards
10.	Zen and the transformation of emotional and physical stress into well being	Sarita Tamayo-Moraga & Darlene Cohen
Part III: Contemplative Practices in Action: Application
11.	The impact of meditation practices in the daily life of Silicon valley leaders /	Andre Delbecq
12.	Shaking the blues away: energizing spiritual practices for the treatment of chronic pain	Amy Wachholtz & Michelle J. Pearce
13.	A pilgrimage from suffering to solidarity: walking the path of contemplative practices	Gerdenio Manuel & Martha E. Stortz
14.	Contemplative practices in action: now what?	Thomas Plante & Adi Raz

"almost all [of the existing books] focus on one particular religious or spiritual tradition... Usually, they highlight the Eastern traditions and overlook the Western ones.".The remaining 13 chapters are divided into three major parts, beginning with Part One, which examines well-defined systems of contemplative practice, such as Mindfulness-based stress reduction, Passage Meditation, and Centering Prayer. Part Two describes contemplative practices in Judaism, Islam (especially Sunni Islam), Yoga, and Zen, citing a growing empirical research literature that links better health to research on Yoga, Zen, and Islamic practice. Part Three emphasizes applications.

== Reviews and influence ==
Reviews have appeared in PsycCRITIQUES, Practical Matters, the Journal of Psychosocial Research, Focus on Alternative and Complementary Therapies, Psycho-Oncology, and Choice.

In PsycCRITIQUES, Edward F. Bourg stated that "in a time full of sensory and information overload, this is a welcome book." While mindfulness "has entered the popular imagination as a curative factor" for health and well-being, this book shows that many other forms of contemplative practice are also being used successfully. The book's "twofold" premise is that both Eastern and Western traditions have a contemplative side, and "Doing, not saying, is what counts." He stated that although generally "the various chapters are very well integrated," the book "isn't seamless," and some Part III chapters analyze practices, such as lamentation and fire-walking, that "are somewhat unusual... and... would appeal to very few of us."

In Practical Matters, Eric J. Kyle of the Claremont School of Theology wrote that the book was "a rich source of wisdom [on] the intersection of contemplative practices and... well-being. " providing a "robust introduction to the breadth of contemplative approaches" from "various religious traditions.", although he wondered why there was no coverage of "native or aboriginal spiritualities."

In the Journal of Psychosocial Research, Uma Gupta of Banaras Hindu University stated that a "strength of this book is its comprehensive identification of issues that are relevant to reducing hypertension in the present era that values speed, productivity and multitasking." To Gupta, the book provides "excellent summaries of historical roots, current research, directions for future research and general applications of the contemplative practices from Eastern and Western religious and spiritual traditions." She also described the book as "capable of transforming the life of the reader in making life more meaningful, purposeful and joyful."

In Focus on Alternative and Complementary Therapies, KJ Sherman wrote that she found the book "unsatisfying," since "for many traditions, the studies reported seemed to focus on religious or mental health outcomes, rather than physical health." She found "no logic to the traditions included," since they varied greatly in their level of empirical support, and would not recommend the book to healthcare providers or researchers. However, "the description of the practices themselves" may be useful to "healthcare providers whose patient populations may embrace contemplative practices in the context of multiple spiritual traditions," and to "religious scholars who want to understand how other practices may be similar to those of their tradition."

In Psycho-Oncology, JL Kristeller stated that "Even those familiar with selected contemplative traditions should find distinctive perspectives," and that the book "lays out a surprising richness of resources related to engaging spiritual well-being though a world heritage of contemplative practices."

In Choice, G. R. Thursby of the University of Florida wrote that the book was structured into "a meaningful whole that can serve as a tool kit for health care professionals and enable religious leaders to find positive points of contact,". He stated that "among the best in the book" are the three chapters about Easwaran's Passage Meditation, Keating's Centering Prayer, and Delbecq's meditation program for Silicon Valley leaders.

== See also ==
- Handbook of Religion and Health
- Faith and Health: Psychological Perspectives
