= Raphael M. Bonelli =

Austrian psychiatrist

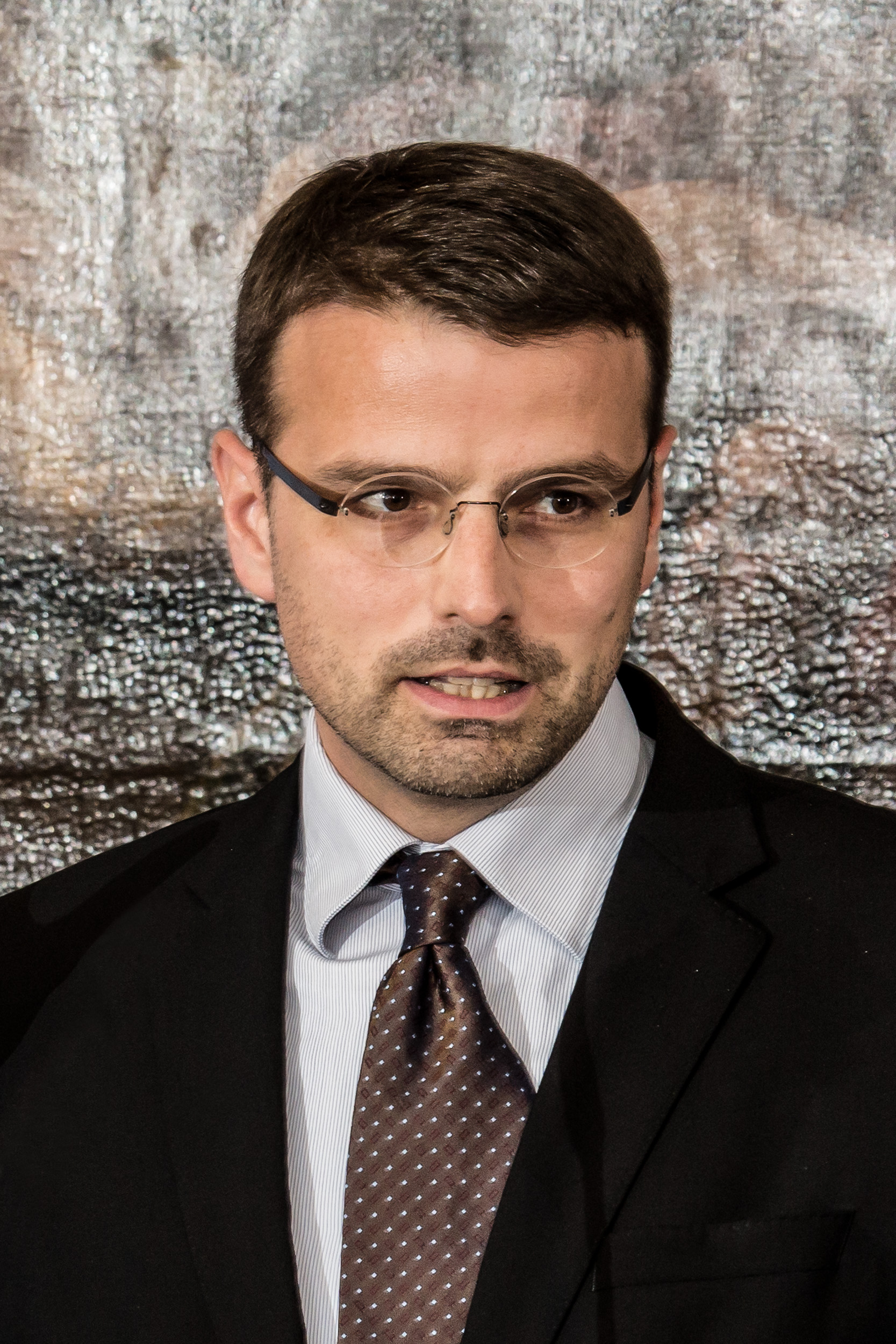
- Raphael Bonelli in 2011
- Born: 10 September 1968 (age 57); Schärding, Austria
- Education: University of Vienna (M.D.), Medical University of Graz (Dr.med.sc.)
- Occupations: Neuroscientist, Psychiatrist
- Employer: Private practice (Vienna)
- Known for: Research on neuropsychiatry, Huntington's disease, connection between mental disorders and religion
- Notable work: Neuropsychiatric research on treatment options for Huntington's disease
- Spouse: Victoria Bonelli
- Children: 5

Raphael M. Bonelli (born 10 September 1968 in Schärding in Austria) is an Austrian neuroscientist and psychiatrist.

He graduated with an M.D. from Vienna University and with a Dr.med.sc. from the Medical University of Graz. He did postdoctoral research at Harvard Medical School, University of California, Los Angeles and Duke University. He is a Faculty Scholar of the Duke University Center for Spirituality, Theology and Health.

Bonelli is a researcher on neuropsychiatry. His scientific interest is dementia, especially Huntington's disease. With his neuropsychiatric research group he described eight new treatment options for this disease: Pramipexol, Quetiapine, Minocycline, Mirtazapine, Zotepine, Ziprasidone, Venlafaxine and antipsychotic drug holidays in Huntington's disease.

In cooperation with Harold Koenig from Duke University, he undertook the first systematic evidence-based analysis on the connection between mental disorders and religion. The researchers conclude that there is good evidence that religious involvement is correlated with better mental health in the areas of depression, substance abuse, and suicide; some evidence in Stress-related disorders and dementia; insufficient evidence in bipolar disorder and schizophrenia, and no data in many other mental disorders.

In 2007, Bonelli was the organizer of an academic conference in Graz with the subject „Religiosität in Psychiatrie und Psychotherapie“ ("Religiosity in Psychiatry and Psychotherapy"), which led to controversies concerning unscientific presentations like "Konversionstherapie" (conversion therapy) and exorcism. Bonelli was said, by the German news magazine Der Spiegel, to be a member of the "ultraconservative" Catholic Opus Dei in 2007, whereas more recent report of 2021 considered him as a former member of Opus Dei.

Bonelli is earning his living as a psychiatrist and psychotherapist since 2008 in a Viennese private practice. He states he's socialized as a Catholic and has special bonds to the Klosterneuburg and the Heiligenkreuz monasteries. Bonelli is married to the kath.net-contributor Victoria Bonelli, who edited an Interview book with her husband. The couple have 5 children.

Bonelli identifies himself as a critic of political measures against the Corona crisis in Austria.
