= The Psychology of Religion and Coping =

1997 book by Kenneth Pargament

The Psychology of Religion and Coping: Theory, Research, Practice
- Author: Kenneth I. Pargament
- Language: English
- Genre: Psychology
- Publisher: Guilford Press
- Publication date: 1997; 2001
- Pages: 548
- ISBN: 1-57230-214-3

The Psychology of Religion and Coping: Theory, Research, Practice by Kenneth Pargament was published in the United States in 1997. It is addressed to professional psychologists and researchers, and has been reviewed in many professional journals. Originally hardbound, it was republished as a paperback in 2001. By 2010, it had been cited more than 450 times in the psychology literature.

== Topics covered ==
The Psychology of Religion and Coping contains 12 chapters that include an introduction and 11 other chapters divided into 4 parts. The parts are entitled:

Part One. A perspective on religion (2 chapters)
Part Two. A perspective on coping (2 chapters)
Part Three. The religion and coping connection (4 chapters)
Part Four. Evaluative and practical implications (3 chapters)

The book also includes 5 appendices.

== Reviews and influence ==
Reviews have appeared in The American Journal of Psychiatry, The Gerontologist, the Journal for the Scientific Study of Religion, the Journal of the American Academy of Religion, the Religious Studies Review Death Studies, and elsewhere.

In the American Journal of Psychiatry, Armando R. Favazza, a widely-published author and Professor Emeritus of Psychiatry, wrote that "This is a very fair and respectful book.... The book sets a new standard of excellence for works on religion and psychology. Although it lacks any biological or psychiatric focus, I highly recommend it to colleagues who desire to organize their thoughts about religion." (p. 988).

In The Gerontologist, George wrote that it was:

The best book that I have read on religion from a psychosocial perspective. As the title indicates, the primary focus of this volume is examination of the links between religion and coping. One of the important qualities of this book is that there is no effort to view religion as one form of coping or to view coping as a manifest function of religion. Each concept is treated in careful conceptual and empirical detail, and the links that emerge testify to the importance of each, separately and jointly. The scope of the book is encyclopedic. I could not identify a question that I had that was not addressed. (p. 508)

In the Journal for the Scientific Study of Religion, McFadden wrote:

This book represents a major theoretical and empirical contribution not only to the psychology of religion and clinical/counseling psychology but to other fields as well. Along with psychologists, persons in religious professions can learn much from Pargament. Mental health professionals, who traditionally have shunned religion in their own lives and in the lived experience of their clients, might be persuaded by Pargament's broadband approach to investigate how religion operates in the tales of coping and crisis they hear on a daily basis. (p. 368)

She added that:

This book is also appropriate for use in courses on the psychology of religion. My students have responded positively to Pargament's careful exposition of his theory, the support he offers in examples from his research and clinical practice, and his engaging use of metaphor. (pp. 368–369)

In the Journal of the American Academy of Religion, McIntosh wrote that:

The weaknesses of this book are a function of its strengths. By aiming for a wide audience the book must cover a lot of ground, some of which is elementary review for some of the readership. The book probes deeply into the complexities of the topic and is encyclopedic in its coverage of the research; it is therefore somewhat daunting in size. By not avoiding the theoretical controversies and empirical weaknesses in this area, the conclusions are sometimes uncertain and the implications more muddy than in less open-eyed, more partisan work.... I highly recommend this book to scholars and practitioners of psychology and religion. It will likely be a long wait until another such impressive work in this area appears. (pp. 702–703)

== See also ==
- Multidimensional Measurement of Religiousness/Spirituality for Use in Health Research (1999 book)
- Handbook of Religion and Health (2001 book)
- Faith and Health: Psychological Perspectives (2001 book)
