= Simon Dein =

Simon Dein is a psychiatrist and anthropologist. As of 2022 he was visiting professor at Goldsmiths, University of London, a senior lecturer at University College London and an honorary clinical professor at the University of Durham.

Dein is founding editor of the journal Mental Health, Religion & Culture.
