= Mental Health, Religion & Culture =

- Discipline: Psychology, public health, religious studies
- Language: English
- Edited by: Simon Dein, Kate Miriam Loewenthal, Christopher Alan Lewis, Kenneth Pargament

Publication details
- History: 1998-present
- Publisher: Routledge
- Frequency: 10/year

Standard abbreviations
- ISO 4: Ment. Health Relig. Cult.

Indexing
- CODEN: MHRCA2
- ISSN: 1367-4676 (print); 1469-9737 (web)
- LCCN: 2008266827
- OCLC no.: 45010288

Links
- Journal homepage; Online before print

Mental Health, Religion and Culture is an interdisciplinary peer-reviewed academic journal published by Routledge. It publishes original articles that deal with mental health in relation to religion and spirituality. The journal was established in 1998. The journal is abstracted and indexed by Scopus, Caredata, CINAHL, CommunityWISE, Family Studies Database, PsycINFO, Theology Digest, Sociological Abstracts, Social Care Institute for Excellence, and Religious and Theological Abstracts.
