= Thomas G. Plante =

American psychologist

Thomas G. Plante (born in Rhode Island, United States) is the Augustin Cardinal Bea, S.J. University Professor of psychology on the faculty of Santa Clara University and adjunct clinical professor of psychiatry and behavioral sciences at Stanford University School of Medicine. His ideas have been covered in Time Magazine and other news media with regard to sexual abuse by Roman Catholic priests, a focus of some of his research and clinical practice. He has also conducted research on exercise psychology, and on the health effects of spiritual and religious practice.

== Education and academic career ==
Plante graduated with a Sc.B. in psychology from Brown University (1982), later receiving his MA (1983) and PhD (1987) in Clinical Psychology from University of Kansas. He did a postdoctoral fellowship in clinical and health psychology at Yale University (1987–1988). He has been Associate Professor (1994–2002) and Professor (2002-) at Santa Clara University in the Department of Psychology (serving as chair in 1999-2002 and 2005–07).

In 2010 and 2011, Plante served as President of Division 36 (Society for the Psychology of Religion and Spirituality) of the American Psychological Association.

== Media coverage ==
Plante's ideas have been covered in a variety of news media. According to his profile at Psychology Today's website, where Plante operates a blog, he has been featured in media outlets that include Time Magazine, CNN, NBC Nightly News, the PBS NewsHour, New York Times, USA Today, BBC, and National Public Radio. For example,

- In 2002, Time featured comments from Plante, as one of five "leading Catholics," on how the Catholic Church could overcome the sexual abuse crisis. He noted that only about 5% of priests had been involved in sexual abuse of minors, a percentage "not inconsistent with other male clergy or with the general population." He also suggested that a "militaristic hierarchy" in the church might have contributed to a comparatively large number of victims per abuser. Later the same month, Time published a letter that referred to Plante's remarks, and asked why Time didn't say more about the 95% of priests who were not abusers.
- In 2005, Time discussed Plante's role in screening applicants for seminary training to become priests.
- In 2000, the Boston Herald discussed Plante's work showing links between stronger religious faith and recovery from substance abuse.

He has been covered in magazines for professionals. For example:

- In 2002, the Monitor on Psychology, sent to all members of the American Psychological Association, covered Plante's ideas about how psychologists might help resolve the crisis in the Roman Catholic Church. He argued that psychologists "can offer the best in science and the best in practice and let data cut through the hysteria."

Plante has been covered in regional media outlets. For example:

- In 2011, Plante was quoted in an article in the Victorville Daily Press about scientific research on gratitude.

Plante's writings have also been published in mass media outlets. For example:

- In 2004, the San Francisco Chronicle published a story by Plante commenting on the sexual abuse crisis.

== Research ==
Plante's clinical and research interests include psychological issues among Catholic clergy and laypersons, ethical decision making, health effects related to spiritual and religious involvement, stress and coping, and the influence of aerobic exercise and perceived fitness on psychological functioning.

Plante's 2001 book (co-edited by Allen Sherman), Faith and Health: Psychological Perspectives (see article), is commonly cited in the professional psychology literature, where it was the focus of several published reviews. In Contemporary Psychology, Richards and O'Grady wrote that "Faith and Health takes us well beyond Freud's, Watson's, Skinner's, and Ellis's oversimplified, negative views of religion and spirituality... [and] sets a high standard of methodological rigor, openness, and balance."

Plante's 2010 book, Contemplative Practices in Action (see article), was reviewed by several professional journals. PsycCRITIQUES described the book as "recommended for those who wish to broaden the discourse [on contemplative practices] beyond mindfulness. Beyond making the case for contemplation as the broader category, it addresses the concern of some that mindfulness can be directed toward the glorification of the self."

== Publications ==
Plante has authored, co-authored, edited, or co-edited sixteen books including

- Faith and Health: Psychological Perspectives (see article) (2001, Guilford)
- Contemplative Practices in Action: Spirituality, Meditation, and Health (see article) (2010, Greenwood)
- Spiritual Practices in Psychotherapy: Thirteen Tools for Enhancing Psychological Health (2009, American Psychological Association)
- Spirit, Science and Health: How the Spiritual Mind Fuels Physical Wellness (2007, Greenwood)
- Mental Disorders of the New Millennium (Vols. I, II, and III, 2006, Greenwood)
- Sin against the Innocents: Sexual Abuse by Priests and the Role of the Catholic Church (2004, Greenwood)
- Do the Right Thing: Living Ethically in an Unethical World (2004, New Harbinger)
- Contemporary Clinical Psychology (1999, 2005, 2010, Wiley)
- Bless Me Father For I Have Sinned: Perspectives on Sexual Abuse Committed by Roman Catholic Priests (1999, Greenwood)
- "Sexual Abuse in the Catholic Church: A Decade of Crisis 2002-2012" (2011, Greenwood)
- "Religion, Spirituality, and Positive Psychology: Understanding the Psychological Fruits of Faith" (2012 Greenwood)

Plante has also published over 150 scholarly professional journal articles and book chapters.
