= Harold G. Koenig =

American psychiatrist

- Born: Harold G. Koenig
- Education: Stanford University (BS); University of California, San Francisco (MD)
- Known for: Research on religion, spirituality, and health
- Scientific career
- Fields: Psychiatry, religion and health
- Workplaces: Duke University

Harold G. Koenig is a Professor of Psychiatry and Behavioral Sciences, and Associate Professor of Medicine, on the faculty of Duke University. A central theme of Koenig's work is the relationship between religious and spiritual involvement and health outcomes, finding that religious involvement and spirituality are associated with better health outcomes.

== Education and academic career ==
Koenig graduated with a B.S. in biology from Stanford University (1974). He trained as a registered nurse (R.N.) at San Joaquin Delta College, before receiving his M.D. (1982) from the University of California, San Francisco. He later completed his geriatric medicine, psychiatry, and biostatistics training at Duke University Medical Center, where he also received his Master of Health Sciences degree.

He became clinical assistant professor in psychiatry (1992) and has been Professor of Psychiatry and Behavioral Sciences (2004–present) and Associate Professor of Medicine (1999–present) at Duke University Medical Center. He is also a Senior Fellow in the Center for the Study of Aging and Human Development (1986–present).

He is the director of Duke University's Center for Spirituality, Theology and Health (formerly the Center for the Study of Religion/Spirituality and Health, which he founded). The Center hosts an annual Spirituality & Health Research Workshop at Duke, now in its 22nd year in 2026.

== Research ==
Koenig has published over 700 scientific articles in peer-reviewed journals, scholarly professional journal articles and 100 chapters in professional books.

A central theme of Koenig's work is the relationship between religious and spiritual involvement and health outcomes. His reviews of published studies, meta-analyses, and systematic reviews have found that most research shows religious involvement and spirituality are associated with better health outcomes, including greater longevity, better coping skills, and enhanced health-related quality of life even during terminal illness, as well as lower rates of anxiety, depression, and suicide. In his 2012 review of quantitative peer-reviewed research published between 1872 and 2010, Koenig examined religion and spirituality in relation to both positive mental health outcomes, including wellbeing, happiness, hope, and optimism, and negative ones such as depression, suicide, anxiety, psychosis, and substance abuse.

In a cooperation with Raphael M. Bonelli from Sigmund Freud University Vienna he undertook the first systematic evidence based analysis on the connection between mental disorders and religion. The researchers conclude that there is good evidence that religious involvement is correlated with better mental health in the areas of depression, substance abuse, and suicide; some evidence in Stress-related disorders and dementia; insufficient evidence in bipolar disorder and schizophrenia, and no data in many other mental disorders.

Among his investigations into specific populations, he has studied religious involvement and telomere length in women family caregivers, and has developed spiritually oriented therapeutic approaches, including a spiritually oriented cognitive processing therapy for moral injury in active duty military personnel and veterans with PTSD.

== Awards and recognition ==
Koenig is the recipient of the 2012 Oskar Pfister Award from the American Psychiatric Association, the 2013 Gary Collins Award from the American Association of Christian Counselors (AACC), and the 2021 Frank Minirth Award for Excellence in Christian Psychiatry and Behavioral Medicine from AACC.

== Media coverage ==
Koenig's ideas have been covered in a wide variety of news media, ranging from BBC radio to the Vatican Radio. Examples include:

- In 2009, Newsweek featured comments from Koenig, stating that he was "leading the charge for a better understanding of patients' religious and spiritual beliefs in the medical setting. 'It just makes too much sense,' he says, when patient after patient tells him, 'Doctor, religion is the most important thing; it keeps me going.' Koenig advocates that doctors take spiritual histories of any patient they are likely to have an ongoing relationship with, asking questions like: 'Is religion a source of comfort or stress? Do you have any religious beliefs that would influence decision-making? Do you have any spiritual needs that someone should address?'"
- In February 2025, Koenig was featured in the New York Times discussing moral injury, and appeared on National Public Radio's Open to Debate program on the question "Can religion cure the loneliness epidemic?".

== Publications ==
=== Books ===
Koenig has authored or edited more than 71 books that include:

- Is Religion Good for Your Health? The Effects of Religion on Physical and Mental Health. Harold G. Koenig (1997, New York: Haworth Pastoral Press)
- Handbook of Religion and Mental Health. Harold G. Koenig (1998, New York: Academic Press)
- Handbook of Religion and Health. Harold G. Koenig, Michael E. McCullough, & David B. Larson. (2001, New York: Oxford University Press)
- Faith and Mental Health: Religious Resources for Healing. Harold G. Koenig (2005, Templeton Foundation Press)
- Chapter 8 in Spirituality and Religion Within the Culture of Medicine: From Evidence to Practice, edited by Michael J. Balboni and John R. Peteet (2017, Oxford University Press)
- Handbook of Religion and Health, 3rd edition. Harold G. Koenig, Tyler VanderWeele (Harvard T.H. Chan School of Public Health), and John Raymond Peteet (Harvard Medical School) (2024, Oxford University Press) Duke

=== Research articles ===
The main papers:

- Koenig, HG; Cohen, HJ; Blazer, DG; Pieper, C; Meador, KG; Shelp, F; et al. (1992). "Religious coping and depression among elderly, hospitalized medically ill men". Am J Psychiatry. 149 (12): 1693–700. doi:10.1176/ajp.149.12.1693. PMID 1443246.
- Koenig, HG; George, LK; Peterson, BL (1998). "Religiosity and remission of depression in medically ill older patients". Am J Psychiatry. 155 (4): 536–42. doi:10.1176/ajp.155.4.536. PMID 9546001.
- Koenig, HG; Hays, JC; George, LK; Blazer, DG; Larson, DB; Landerman, LR (1997). "Modeling the cross-sectional relationships between religion, physical health, social support, and depressive symptoms". Am J Geriatr Psychiatry. 5 (2): 131–44. doi:10.1097/00019442-199700520-00006. PMID 9106377.
- Bonelli, Rafael M.; Koenig, Harold G. (2013). "Mental Disorders, Religion and Spirituality 1990 to 2010: A Systematic Evidence-Based Review". Journal of Religion and Health. 52 (2): 657–73. doi:10.1007/s10943-013-9691-4. PMID 23420279. S2CID 25776972.
