= Fetzer Institute =

Organization

- Founded: 1962
- Founder: John Fetzer
- Type: Private foundation (IRS status): 501(c)(3)
- Location: Kalamazoo, Michigan
- Region served: Global
- Method: Endowment
- Key people: Bob Boisture, President and CEO
- Employees: 60
- Website: www.fetzer.org

The Fetzer Institute, based in Kalamazoo, Michigan, was founded by broadcast pioneer and Detroit Tigers baseball team owner John E. Fetzer (1901–1991). He formed the institute to support work “designed to discover and enhance the integral relationships of the physical, mental, emotional, and spiritual dimensions of experience which foster human growth, action, and responsible improvement of the human and cosmic condition.”

== Mission ==
The institute's stated mission is helping build the spiritual foundation for a loving world. Fetzer's worldview centers around the sacredness of reality, which includes the “centrality of Spirit,” integration of science and spirituality, and the sacredness of all people and the planet. It supports this mission by working with thought leaders to develop programs and research projects, and issues grants in sectors including faith and spirituality, democracy, education, and organizational culture. The Seasons retreat center, on its campus in Kalamazoo, is used to convene partners. GilChrist Retreat Center, in Three Rivers, offers contemplative and spiritual programs and is open to the public.

== Endowment ==
John E. Fetzer, listed in 1986 by Forbes magazine as one of the 400 wealthiest people in the United States, bequeathed most of his assets from the sale of the Detroit Tigers, Fetzer Cablevision, and other enterprises to the institute upon his death in 1991. As of June 2020, the institute's endowment is valued at more than $560 million.

== Grants, research, and programs ==
John Fetzer's vision of more consciously integrating the “inner life of mind and spirit with the outer life of action and service” is apparent throughout the institute's programmatic history. Fetzer provided funding through the 1990s toward Daniel Goleman’s seminal work on emotional intelligence and the establishment of the field of social and emotional learning; for Jon Kabat-Zinn’s pioneering work on mindfulness-based stress reduction at the University of Massachusetts Medical School; and for Parker Palmer’s teacher formation programs now known as the Center for Courage & Renewal.

Work supported by the institute includes research examining how stress, social support, compassionate love, and religiousness and spirituality affect health and healing with studies through the National Institutes of Health, the General Social Survey, and the World Health Organization. The Daily Spiritual Experience Scale, “a 16-item self-report measure of … ordinary, or daily, spiritual experiences—not mystical experiences (e.g., hearing voices)—and how they are an everyday part of the individual’s life,” developed by Lynn G. Underwood while at the institute in 1994, has been used widely by researchers in the social sciences and has been translated into more than 28 languages.

In 2009 Fetzer worked with pioneering forgiveness researcher Everett Worthington to create a network of scholars to contribute to the field of forgiveness research. In 2010, the institute released its “Survey of Love and Forgiveness in American Society.” The institute also provided major funding for The Shamatha Project led by B. Alan Wallace and Clifford Saron. This longitudinal research project, completed in 2013, studied how intensive meditation training affects the development of positive human qualities, especially those associated with love and compassion, and the psychological and physiological pathways involved.

The Fetzer Franklin Fund was established by the John E. Fetzer Memorial Trust, with the support of the John E. Fetzer Institute, to advance the scientific exploration of a relationship-centered view of reality. It supports publications, organises conferences with global outreach, on advanced science fields like quantum physics and quantum mechanics. The Trust is administered by Bruce Fetzer as President and CEO and actively overseen by a Board of Trustees, which is chaired by Lou Leeburg, to set the direction for the scientific legacy of the organization’s founder John E. Fetzer.

More recently, in 2020 the institute commissioned and published “What Does Spirituality Mean to Us? A Study of Spirituality in the United States"; in 2019, it funded a report from The Evangelical & Religious Liberty Commission by Paul D. Miller titled "Faith and Healthy Democracy”; and in 2018 Fetzer president and CEO Bob Boisture published, “Civic Virtues and the Healing of Partisan Divides.” During this time, the institute also began to shape work related to discovering the “sacredness of reality” by integrating the scientific and spiritual ways of knowing.

== Popular culture ==
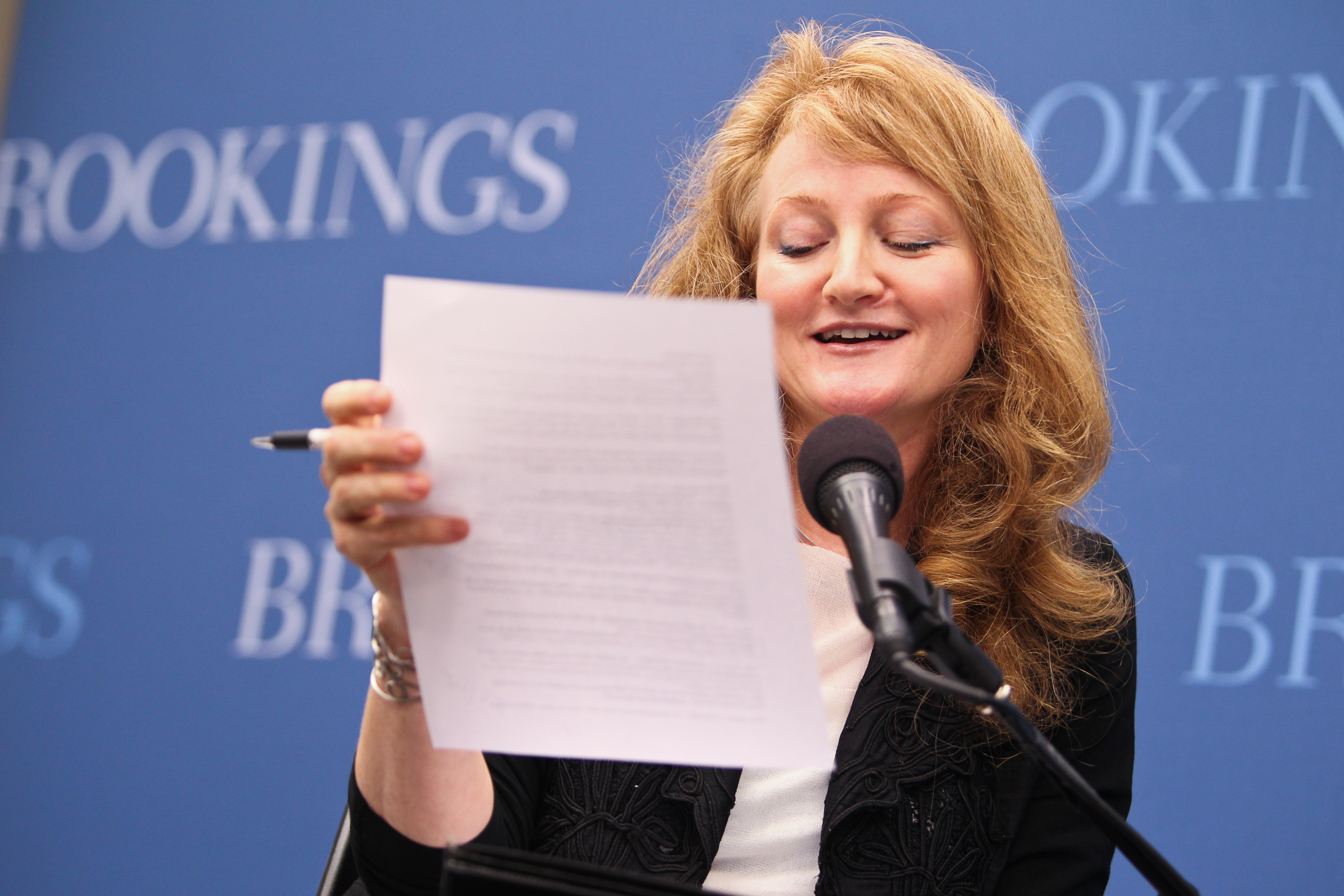
Krista Tippett, Host of "On Being"

Fetzer has been a major underwriter for Krista Tippett’s Peabody Award-winning spirituality podcast On Being; Louie Schwartzberg’s Netflix series Moving Art; the Mission Joy: Finding Happiness in Troubled Times documentary about the friendship between the Dalai Lama and Archbishop Desmond Tutu; the PBS series God in America and the Emmy Award-winning PBS Series, Healing and the Mind with Bill Moyers.

== Convenings ==
To further its work, the Fetzer Institute brings together leaders, innovators, and stakeholders in its various areas of interest at its retreat center, Seasons. These convenings, which range from contemplative retreats for young leaders to meetings of researchers to advance work in specific sectors, often result in publications and other resources, such as “What Does Spirituality Mean to Us?”, “Sharing Spiritual Heritage”, “Sacredness of the Other”, the “We the People” Book Club Guides, “Virtual Sacred Space”, and the “Practicing Democracy” video series.

== Funding partners ==
To extend the reach of its work, the Fetzer Institute partners with co-funders who share a similar vision. These include the John Templeton Foundation, Democracy Fund, Hewlett Foundation, Einhorn Collaborative, and Stand Together.

== The Institute Workplace: A "Community of Freedom" ==
For the institute to succeed, John Fetzer believed that the people running it “must come together and make a settlement within themselves, as to a sense of participation, in the pursuit of this agenda.” He referred to this as a “community of freedom.” To support this philosophy, the institute, under the leadership of president and CEO Bob Boisture, has established a way of working to aid its entire staff in “being the work” and participating in the organization's mission of “Helping build the spiritual foundation for a loving world”—via diverse policies and staff development efforts—so they can support Institute partners in pursuing this same mission. In 2020, the Center for Evaluation Innovation published the report “Co-creating Our Story: A Hybrid Participatory Case Approach to Evaluating and Accelerating Organizational Change,” documenting this effort.

Love is the core energy that rules everything ...love is the one ingredient that holds us all together.

—John E. Fetzer
