= Anglican Theological Review =

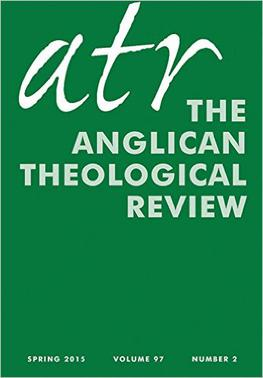
- Discipline: Theology
- Language: English
- Edited by: Jason Fout; Scott MacDougall

Publication details
- History: 1918–present
- Publisher: Sewanee: The University of the South (United States)
- Frequency: Quarterly

Standard abbreviations
- ISO 4: Angl. Theol. Rev.

Indexing
- ISSN: 0003-3286
- OCLC no.: 223307786

Links
- Journal homepage

The Anglican Theological Review is the "unofficial journal of the seminaries of the Episcopal Church in the United States and the Anglican Church of Canada." Issues include peer-reviewed articles, poetry submissions, and book reviews. The journal is indexed in L'Année philologique, Old Testament Abstracts, ATLA Religion Database and Modern Language Association Database. Current editors-in-chief are Jason Fout (Bexley Seabury Federation) and Scott MacDougall (Church Divinity School of the Pacific).

Anglican Theological Review Inc. is a 501(c)(3) Public Charity with an official address in Sewanee, Tennessee. In 2025 it claimed $103,430 in revenue and total assets of $240,280. The organization's charity ruling is from 1945.
