= Journal of Religion & Health =

Journal of Religion and Health
- Discipline: Psychology, religion, health, sociology, spirituality
- Language: English
- Edited by: Lindsay B. Carey

Publication details
- History: 1961–present
- Publisher: Springer Science+Business Media
- Frequency: Bimonthly
- Impact factor: 2.2 (2025)

Standard abbreviations
- ISO 4: J. Relig. Health

Indexing
- CODEN: JRHEAT
- ISSN: 0022-4197 (print); 1573-6571 (web)
- LCCN: 64006093
- JSTOR: 00224197
- OCLC no.: 44707874

Links
- Journal homepage; Online archive

The Journal of Religion and Health is a bimonthly peer-reviewed academic journal. It was established in 1961 by the Blanton-Peale Institute and published by Springer Science+Business Media. The journal covers contemporary quantitative and qualitative religious, pastoral and spiritual care research which utilizes current medical, psychological, and sociological theories and praxis.

== Abstracting and indexing ==
The journal is abstracted and indexed by in the following bibliographic databases:

- ATLA Religion Database
- Academic Search Premier
- Arts and Humanities Citation Index
- CINAHL
- Embase
- International Bibliography of Periodical Literature
- Index Islamicus
- MEDLINE
- PsycINFO
- Scopus
- Social Sciences Citation Index

According to the Journal Citation Reports, the journal has a 2025 impact factor of 2.2.
