= International Journal for the Psychology of Religion =

- Discipline: Psychology of religion
- Language: English
- Edited by: Heinz Streib

Publication details
- History: 1991–present
- Publisher: Taylor & Francis
- Frequency: Quarterly
- Impact factor: 1.639 (2011)

Standard abbreviations
- ISO 4: Int. J. Psychol. Relig.

Indexing
- CODEN: IPRLEB
- ISSN: 1050-8619 (print); 1532-7582 (web)
- LCCN: 91641651
- OCLC no.: 45255134

Links
- Journal homepage

The International Journal for the Psychology of Religion is a peer-reviewed academic journal devoted to research on the psychology of religion. Its scope includes the social psychology of religion, religious development, conversion, religious experience, religion and social attitudes and behavior, religion and mental health, and psychoanalytic and other theoretical interpretations of religion. The current editor-in-chief is Heinz Streib (Bielefeld University). As of 2020, the book review editors were Katarzyna Skrzypińska (University of Gdańsk) and W. Paul Williamson (Henderson State University).

== Abstracting and indexing ==
The journal is abstracted and indexed in PsycINFO, Applied Social Sciences Index and Abstracts, Arts and Humanities Citation Index, Current Contents/Arts & Humanities, Current Contents/Social and Behavioral Sciences, EBSCO databases, Family Index Database, Journal Citation Reports/Social Sciences Religion Index One, Religious and Theological Abstracts, Scopus, and Social Sciences Citation Index (as of 2011).

Beginning with volume 18 (2008), the journal is included in the databases of the Institute for Scientific Information. According to the Journal Citation Reports, the journal has a 2011 impact factor of 1.639, ranking it 37th out of 124 journals in the category "Psychology, Multidisciplinary".
