= Michael Earl McCullough =

American psychologist (born 1969)

- Citizenship: United States
- Education: University of Florida (BS); Virginia Commonwealth University (MS, PhD)
- Scientific career
- Fields: Social psychology
- Workplaces: Louisiana Tech University; Southern Methodist University; University of Miami; University of California, San Diego
- Thesis: Forgiveness as altruism: A social-psychological theory of interpersonal forgiveness and tests of its validity (1995)
- Website: michael-mccullough.com

Michael Earl McCullough (born July 27, 1969) is an American psychologist. He is a professor at the Department of Psychology at the University of California, San Diego since 2019.

McCullough received a Bachelor of Science from the University of Florida in 1990. He received a Master of Science in 1992 and a Doctor of Philosophy in 1995, both in psychology and from Virginia Commonwealth University. His doctoral dissertation was in social psychology and titled Forgiveness as altruism: A social-psychological theory of interpersonal forgiveness and tests of its validity (1995).

He is the author of The Kindness of Strangers: How a Selfish Ape Invented a New Moral Code (Basic Books, 2020) and Beyond Revenge: The Evolution of the Forgiveness Instinct (2008, Jossey-Bass).
