= Spirituality and homelessness =

Spirituality affects both mental and physical health outcomes in the general United States population across different ethnic groups. Because of the nuanced definitions of spirituality and religiosity, the literature on spirituality is not consistent in definitions or measures, resulting in a lack of coherence. However, taken as a whole, research tends to show that the effect of spirituality is positive, associated with better health outcomes. For those who engage in spirituality, it may serve as a buffer from negative life events, often moderating the relationship between negative life experiences and levels of anxiety or depression. The exception is when negative spiritual coping is practiced. This type of coping has negative health implications.

The homeless are a vulnerable population that experiences the moderating effect of spirituality; spirituality plays a role in their emotional and mental capacity to handle challenges they face and practice health-promoting behaviors. For the homeless who practice spirituality as a positive coping mechanism, it often improves their life and is cited as a source of strength and comfort in qualitative research.

== Spirituality ==
=== Definition ===
Spirituality does not have a clear definition, though it is generally regarded as the search for and experience of the sacred, meaning God, a higher power, or something of divine nature. Spirituality is characterized as something experienced personally, an individualized process that involves personal or private beliefs. However, it may involve the values of community and relationship, or an emphasis on the connectedness of people. Spirituality often emphasizes the integration of mind, body and spirit, and it can provide a sense of purpose or life significance.

There is considerable overlap in the definitions of religion and spirituality and, for this reason, they are often used interchangeably in the literature. Religion, like spirituality, can provide people a sense of purpose or meaning through personal beliefs. The main distinguishing factor between religion and spirituality is that religion is generally practiced collectively with some type of structural or institutional reinforcement. Both terms are multi-faceted and are typically measured along similar dimensions. Common dimensions of spirituality/religion as defined by the National Institute of Healthcare Research and NIA/Fetzer Institute are as follows:

- Preference or affiliation: membership in a specific religious or spiritual group
- Public practices: involvement in formal activities such as attendance at services
- Private practices: private behaviors such as prayer, meditation, or reading sacred texts
- Spiritual experiences: interaction or experience with the divine manifested in feelings and sensations
- Spiritual coping: how an individual uses beliefs to cope with stressful events; can be positive or negative
- Beliefs and values: specific beliefs and values
- Forgiveness: experience of reconciliation with others and with the divine, can be a form of spiritual coping
- Social support: intangible and tangible support offered by other members of the spiritual/religious community
- Intensity/commitment: importance of spirituality relative to other areas of life and its effect on behavior
- Spiritual meaning: sense of purpose and meaning of one's life as a result of spirituality

These dimensions are simply two examples of measures used in the literature on spirituality. Because of the nebulous definition of spirituality in the literature, measures are not consistent across different studies, resulting in a lack of coherence in the literature. However, there is a consensus in research done on spirituality that it influences health. This effect is generally positive with the exception of negative spiritual coping.

=== Effect on physical health ===
Spiritual wellbeing has been associated with positive physical health outcomes in research. Spirituality reduces the likelihood of illness and is strongly related to increased longevity. For example, it lowers the rate of heart disease, cirrhosis, emphysema, stroke, kidney failure, cancer mortality, overall mortality. Spirituality also decreases blood pressure and cholesterol levels. If someone does become ill or must endure surgery, they are likely to have a better recovery. These effects may vary depending on the strictness of behavioral codes associated with a religion, the intensity of the person's practice of spirituality, and whether or not their spiritual experience is a positive one. If someone uses negative spiritual coping, the positive health benefits will not happen and the individual's health may be influenced negatively (see religious/spiritual coping section).

=== Effect on mental health ===
Spirituality tends to improve mental health. Spirituality is associated with lower rates of suicide, anxiety disorders, and depression. In regards to depression, individuals who are more spiritually involved are more likely to recover. In a review of forty-three studies, Rew and Wong (2006) found that religiosity and spirituality are important correlates of adolescent health with 84% of the literature indicating a positive correlation. Spirituality also reduces the likelihood of drug/alcohol dependency or abuse and is associated with a more effective recovery from abuse/dependence. While spirituality generally improves mental health, for individuals who use harmful forms of religious coping, spirituality is "correlated with impaired mental health and poorer resolution of negative life events."

=== Religious/spiritual coping ===
There are two types of spiritual coping, positive and negative. Positive spiritual coping manifests itself as a strong relationship with God, seeking support from the community and a higher power, looking for meaning in life and helping others. Most people who practice spirituality engage in positive spiritual coping which is associated with improved mental and physical health.

Negative spiritual coping, a pattern distinct from positive spiritual coping, has negative health implications. Negative spiritual coping involves deferring all responsibility to God, feeling abandoned by God or blaming God for difficulties. It often manifests itself as a less secure relationship with God, an ominous worldview and general spiritual discontent. For those who engage in negative spiritual coping, it is related to significantly poorer physical and mental health outcomes as well as higher mortality. In a study done by Pargament (1998), negative spiritual coping had differing negative health implications among different populations. For citizens of Oklahoma City who experienced the federal building bombing, it was associated with more post-traumatic stress disorder symptoms and higher levels of callousness. For college students, negative spiritual coping was associated with higher levels of emotional distress and poorer physical health. For hospital patients with physical ailments, negative spiritual coping was associated with higher levels of depression and lower quality of life.

== Role of spirituality in the lives of homeless people ==
A homeless person is an individual without a consistent, fixed nighttime residence or someone whose nighttime residence is a supervised shelter that provides temporary housing. Homelessness is a chronic stressor producing reduced wellbeing. Homeless populations are a vulnerable population experiencing a higher prevalence of mental and physical health problems as well as victimization and increased mortality rates. Spirituality is one method some homeless individuals use to cope with their position of high vulnerability. Runquist and Reed (2007) found that spiritual perspective correlated positively with measures of wellbeing among the sample of homeless individuals surveyed and that measures of wellbeing correlated positively with self-rated health status. Social capital resulting from spirituality or religion, according to Irwin (2008), is a critical factor to wellbeing among homeless populations. It increases the resource base of the individual enabling them to cope with their situation in healthier ways.

=== Youth ===
Youth, typically defined as people between the ages of twelve and twenty-four, make up a large portion of the homeless population. As they are a transient population, it is difficult to get an accurate count of homeless youth; the number is commonly thought to be somewhere between 1.3 and 2 million. These youth have higher rates of mental health disorders, suicide, and drug/alcohol dependency due to the high amount of stressors in their lives.

Spirituality is one of many coping mechanisms homeless youth employ in order to manage life on the streets as well as techniques such as avoidant coping, use of alcohol, interpersonal skills, problem-focused coping and self-reliance. Spirituality as a coping mechanism often serves as positive force in the lives of homeless youth. Kidd (2003) surveyed 80 street youth on the topic of coping and found that spirituality gave meaning to suffering, enabling the youth to process negative emotion and retain some hope. In interviews done by Lindsey et al. (2000), spirituality served as a resource to youth and empowered those engaged in spirituality to redirect their lives in a healthy manner. A theme across multiple studies the coping mechanisms of homeless youth is that their beliefs act as a source of strength and comfort; many attribute their ability to survive to the direct intervention of a higher power or to their faith. One individual in a group discussion conducted by Bender (2007) commented on his engagement with the divine as a source of comfort and survival saying, "The man upstairs is what helps me. Just knowing that he's there. There may be times when I feel like he's not there, but he's helping me out slowly."

These positive effects of spirituality appear largely in qualitative work, meaning that the youth themselves associate spirituality with improved coping and better mental health. Youth who do not engage in spirituality thus do not use it as a coping mechanism and do not comment on it. There are no examples of negative religious coping among the youth in the studies cited. However, a quantitative study conducted by Kidd and Carroll revealed that spirituality was not associated with a lower suicide risk in homeless youth.

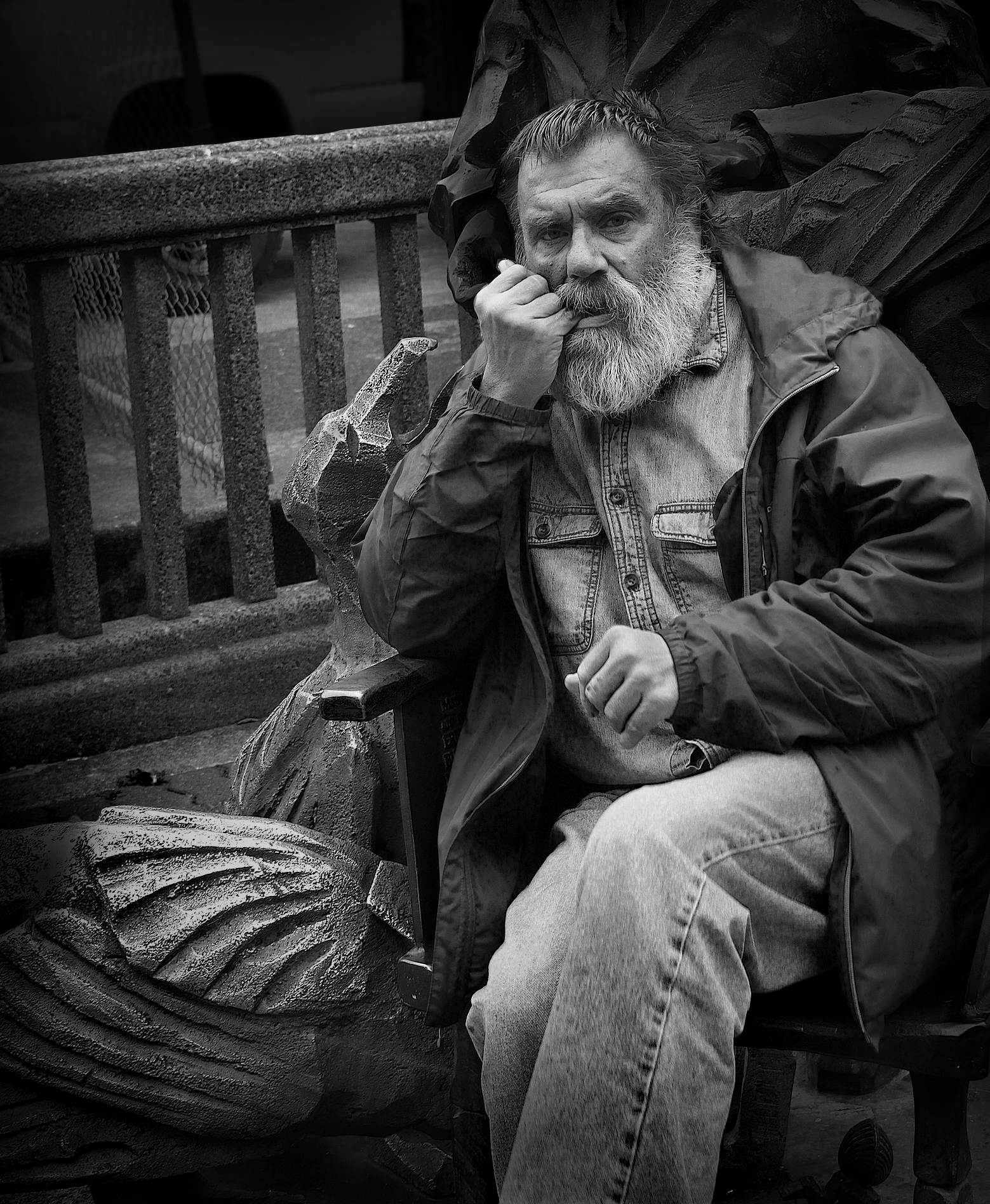
Homeless man

=== Men ===
For homeless men, specifically those suffering from a substance abuse problem or who are in crisis, spirituality often serves as a positive coping mechanism, giving meaning to life and is tied to a sense of peace. However, positive spiritual coping lessens in its effectiveness the longer someone is homeless and is not as effective for homeless men with mental health problems as for those who are alcohol/drug dependent or in crisis. Many homeless men attribute their ability to get sober to their spirituality, though this may be a product of the spiritual nature of programs like Alcoholics Anonymous. In a study done by Brush and McGee (2000) surveying homeless men in a shelter for recovery, 78% of the respondents commented on how their spiritual views influence their decisions and two-thirds agreed or strongly agreed "to seeking spiritual guidance in daily life experiences."

=== Women ===
Women are the fastest growing segment of the homeless population, making up an estimated 32% of the population. Many of these women are single mothers. African American women are disproportionately represented among homeless populations as a result of their increased vulnerability to socioeconomic structures. Homeless women, irrespective of ethnicity, tend to have more health problems than the general public including higher rates of substance abuse and mental health issues, as well as prior victimization.

Spirituality is used as a coping mechanism by many women of various ethnicities to deal with the stress of being homeless and/or to recover from substance abuse. It serves as a source of emotional support as well as a motivating force for women to take care of themselves and their families in a healthy way. Many accredit God with their survival and ability to be clean, looking to their spirituality to guide them in parenting. In a study by Shuler (1994), 42% of homeless women surveyed said their beliefs gave them strength and helped them survive. For the women who considered prayer an effective coping mechanism, they experienced considerably less worries and depressive symptoms. Increased spirituality is associated with less substance abuse; for women who do not use drugs or alcohol, religious/moral beliefs are often the basis of their decision. Higher levels of spirituality is also associated with a lowered risk of depression and suicide among homeless women as well as increased health-promoting behaviors.

==== African-American women ====
Research shows that African Americans as a population, especially women, tend to have higher levels of religious involvement and deep ties to faith and spirituality. This is the case for homeless African American women as well; spirituality plays a larger role as a coping mechanism for African American homeless women than other women. Douglas et al. (2008) found that homeless African American women placed a higher importance on spirituality and that lower rates of spiritual well-being among African American homeless mothers resulted in higher anxiety, increased trauma, punitive parenting and child behavioral issues. A study done by Washington et al. (2009) in which older African American homeless women were interviewed found that spirituality was an important asset for these women. Through their faith, they felt empowered to take control of their lives. These women's experience of spirituality also had a mediating effect on their worries and concerns.
