= Kenneth Pargament =

American psychologist

- Born: November 3, 1950 (age 75)
- Education: University of Maryland
- Scientific career
- Fields: Psychology; Psychology of religion
- Workplaces: Bowling Green State University

Kenneth I. Pargament (born November 3, 1950) is an emeritus professor of psychology at Bowling Green State University (Ohio, US).

== Biography ==
Born in 1950 in Washington, D.C., Pargament received his Ph.D. from the University of Maryland in 1977. He currently studies various relationships between religion, psychological well-being and stress, as well as other closely related subjects. He is also licensed in Clinical Psychology and has a private practice.

Pargament has published over 200 papers on the subject of religion and spirituality in psychology. He is world-renowned for his scholarly contributions to the psychology of religion, and for providing clinically relevant scientific analyses of religion's role in mental health. Pargament has also written multiple books, including The Psychology of Religion and Coping: Theory, Research, Practice (1997; see article), and Spiritually Integrated Psychotherapy: Understanding and Addressing the Sacred (2007). Both of these seminal works provide a systematic program of empirical research, guided by theory, that is of practical relevance to helping professionals.

== Research ==
One of Pargament's best known areas of research has pertained to Religious Coping, which involves drawing on religious beliefs and practices to understand and deal with life stressors. Pargament has also helped to design a questionnaire called the "RCOPE" to measure Religious Coping strategies. The three methods of coping that are identified by the RCOPE are the deferring style, self-directing style, and collaborative style. The deferring style involves delegating all problem solving to God; the self-directing style is when the individual chooses to utilize the power God has given them to solve the problem on their own; and the collaborative style is implemented when the individual treats God as a teammate in the problem solving process. The collaborative style of religious coping has been found to have the greatest psychological benefits, correlating with increased self-esteem and lower levels of depression. Thus, Pargament's work has helped set the stage for a large scale program of research on this subject: currently there have been over 250 published studies on religious coping.

Pargament's research also has helped psychologists learn how religious belief influences mental and physical health. For instance, he found that religious activity increased for Muslim-Americans after 9/11, and that in comparison with those who remained isolated and rejected by their religion, they experienced fewer symptoms of depression Similarly, he found that negative religious coping among AIDS patients was associated with an increase in HIV-related symptoms

Pargament has described four major stances toward religion that have been adopted by psychotherapists in their work with clients. He called them the religiously rejectionist, exclusivist, constructivist, and pluralist stances. He claims that the pluralistic approach is the best for clinicians because it recognizes the existence of a Supreme Being but allows for many interpretations of that reality. Furthermore, Pargament believes that religious discussions should become a greater part of the therapeutic process. He has advocated for religious guidebooks to be created for psychotherapists and that religious training be mandated.

Pargament has also linked attribution theory to the psychology of religion, doing empirical research distinguishing between different forms of religious attribution.

== Published books ==
Authored:

- Kenneth I. Pargament (2007). Spiritually integrated psychotherapy: Understanding and addressing the sacred. New York: Guilford. ISBN 978-1-57230-844-2
- Kenneth I. Pargament (1997). The psychology of religion and coping: Theory, research, practice (see article). New York: Guilford. ISBN 978-1-57230-664-6

Edited:

- Pargament, Kenneth I., ed. (2013). APA handbook of psychology, religion, and spirituality (2 volumes). Washington, DC: American Psychological Association. ISBN 978-1-4338-1077-0. OCLC 792941510.
  - Pargament, Kenneth I.; Exline, Julie J.; Jones, James W., eds. (2013). APA handbook of psychology, religion, and spirituality (Vol 1): Context, theory, and research. Washington, DC: American Psychological Association. doi:10.1037/14045-000. ISBN 978-1-4338-1079-4.
  - Pargament, Kenneth I.; Mahoney, Annette; Shafranske, Edward P., eds. (2013). APA handbook of psychology, religion, and spirituality (Vol 2): An applied psychology of religion and spirituality. Washington, DC: American Psychological Association. doi:10.1037/14046-000. ISBN 978-1-43381080-0.
- Michael E. McCullough, Kenneth I. Pargament, & Carl E. Thoresen (Eds.) (2000), Forgiveness: Theory, research, and practice. New York: Guilford. ISBN 978-1-57230-711-7

== See also ==
- Multidimensional Measurement of Religiousness/Spirituality (book containing 2 chapters, scales, by Pargament)
