= David J. A. Clines =

Australian biblical scholar (1938–2022)

David John Alfred Clines
- Born: 21 November 1938; Sydney, Australia
- Died: 8 December 2022 (aged 84)
- Known for: foundation of the Sheffield Academic Press, Dictionary of Classical Hebrew, foundation of Sheffield Phoenix Press
- Board member of: past President of the Society for Old Testament Study, past President of the Society of Biblical Literature

Academic background
- Education: University of Sydney, St John’s College, Cambridge

Academic work
- Discipline: Biblical studies
- Institutions: University of Sheffield
- Notable works: Job (WBC)

David John Alfred Clines (21 November 1938 – 8 December 2022) was a biblical scholar. He served as professor at the University of Sheffield.

== Education ==
Clines was born in Sydney, Australia, and studied at the University of Sydney and St John’s College, Cambridge.

== Career ==
He served as president of the Society for Old Testament Study, as well as president of the Society of Biblical Literature. In 2003, a Festschrift was published in his honour. Reading from Right to Left: Essays on the Hebrew Bible in Honour of David J.A. Clines (ISBN 0826466869) included contributions by James Barr, John Barton, Joseph Blenkinsopp, Walter Brueggemann, Brevard Childs, Patrick D. Miller, Rolf Rendtorff, Hugh Williamson, and Ellen van Wolde. In 2013, he was honoured with another Festschrift, Interested Readers: Essays on the Hebrew Bible in Honor of David J. A. Clines, which included contributions from Marc Zvi Brettler, Norman C. Habel, and Athalya Brenner.

Clines served as president of the Society of Biblical Literature in 2009. Together with David M. Gunn, Clines made the University of Sheffield a pioneer in literary readings of the final form of the biblical text. Followers of this approach are sometimes referred to as the "Sheffield school".

Clines died on 8 December 2022.

== Honours ==
In 2015, Clines was awarded the Burkitt Medal by the British Academy "in recognition of his significant contribution to the study of the Hebrew Bible and Hebrew lexicography".

== Selected works ==
=== Books ===
- Clines, David J. A. (1978). The Theme of the Pentateuch. JSOT Supplements. Vol. 10. Sheffield: JSOT Press.
- ——— (1984). The Esther Scroll: the story of the story. Journal for the study of the Old Testament: Supplement series. Vol. 30. Sheffield: JSOT Press. ISBN 9780567157133. OCLC 276358541.
- ——— (1984). Ezra, Nehemiah, Esther: based on the Revised Standard Version. New Century Bible Commentary. Grand Rapids, MI & London: Eerdmans & Marshall, Morgan & Scott. ISBN 9780802800176. OCLC 11113882.
- ——— (1989). Job 1-20. Word Biblical Commentary. Vol. 17. Nashville, TN: Thomas Nelson. ISBN 978-0-8499-0216-1.
- ——— (1990). What Does Eve Do to Help? - and Other Readerly Questions to the Old Testament. JSOT Supplements. Vol. 94. Sheffield: JSOT Press.
- ——— (1993–2016). The Dictionary of Classical Hebrew, 9 vols. Sheffield: Sheffield Phoenix Press.
- ——— (1995). Interested Parties: The Ideology of Writers and Readers of the Old Testament. JSOT Supplements. Vol. 205. Sheffield: Sheffield Academic Press.
- ——— (1998). On the Way to the Postmodern: Old Testament Essays, 1967–1998 (2 vols.). JSOT Supplements. Vol. 268. Sheffield: JSOT Press. ISBN 1-8507-5901-4.
- ——— (2006). Job 21-37. Word Biblical Commentary. Vol. 18a. Nashville, TN: Thomas Nelson. ISBN 978-0-8499-0217-8.
- ——— (2009). The Concise Dictionary of Classical Hebrew. Sheffield: Sheffield Phoenix Press. ISBN 978-1-9060-5579-0.
- ——— (2011). Job 38-42. Word Biblical Commentary. Vol. 18b. Nashville, TN: Thomas Nelson. ISBN 978-0-7852-5267-2.

sources of bibliography

=== Edited by ===
- ———; Gunn, D. M.; Hauser, Alan J., eds. (1982). Art and meaning: rhetoric in Biblical literature. Journal for the study of the Old Testament: Supplement series. Vol. 19. Sheffield: JSOT Press. ISBN 9780567405241. OCLC 276307111.
- ———; Sawyer, John F. A., eds. (1983). Midian, Moab, and Edom: the history and archaeology of late Bronze and Iron Age Jordan and north-west Arabia. Journal for the study of the Old Testament: Supplement series. Vol. 24. Sheffield: JSOT Press. ISBN 9780567174451. OCLC 276783694.
- ———; Fowl, Stephen E.; Porter, Stanley E., eds. (1990). The Bible in Three Dimensions: essays in celebration of forty years of biblical studies in the University of Sheffield. Journal for the study of the Old Testament: Supplement series. Vol. 87. Sheffield: JSOT Press. ISBN 9780567540379. OCLC 276307035.

=== Chapters ===
- ——— (1982). "The Arguments of Job's Three Friends". In ———; Gunn, D. M.; Hauser, Alan J. (eds.). Art and meaning: rhetoric in Biblical literature. Journal for the study of the Old Testament: Supplement series. Vol. 19. Sheffield: JSOT Press. pp. 266–. ISBN 9780567405241. OCLC 276307111.
- ——— (1989). "The Wisdom Books". In Biggar, Stephen (ed.). Creating The Old Testament: The Emergence of the Hebrew Bible. Oxford: Basil Blackwell. pp. 384–. ISBN 0631162496.
- ——— (2015). "Predestination in the Old Testament". In Pinnock, Clark H. (ed.). Grace for all : the Arminian dynamics of salvation. Eugene, OR: Resource Publications.

=== Journal articles ===
- ——— (1972). "Regnal Year Reckoning in the Last Year of the Kingdom of Judah". American Journal of Biblical Archaeology. 2: 9–34.
- ——— (1972–1973). "The Theology of the Flood Narrative". Faith and Thought. 100 (2): 128–142.
- ——— (March 1974). "Evidence for an autumnal new year in pre-exilic Israel reconsidered". Journal of Biblical Literature. 93 (1): 22–40. doi:10.2307/3263863. JSTOR 3263863.
- ——— (1976). "New Directions in Pooh Studies: Überlieferungs- und religionsgeschichtliche Studien zum Pu-Buch". Theolog Review. 12: 2–10. Reprinted in On the Way to the Postmodern: Old Testament Essays, 1967–1998 (Sheffield Academic Press, 1998), Vol. 2, pp. 830–839.
- ——— (1979). "The Significance of the 'Sons of God' (Gen. 6,1-4) in the Context of Primeval History (Gen 1-11)". Journal for the Study of the Old Testament. 13: 33–46.
- ——— (1981). "Job 5:1-8: A New Exegesis". Biblica. 62: 185–94.

== Festschriften ==
- Exum, J. Cheryl; Williamson, Hugh G. M., eds. (2003). Reading from Right to Left: Essays on the Hebrew Bible in Honour of David J. A. Clines. Journal for the Study of the Old Testament: Supplement series. Vol. 373. London & New York: Sheffield Academic Press. ISBN 9780567459992. OCLC 276841809.
- Aitken, James K.; Clines, Jeremy M.S.; Maier, Christl M., eds. (2013). Interested Readers: Essays on the Hebrew Bible in Honor of David J. A. Clines. Atlanta: SBL Press. ISBN 9781589839243. OCLC 864141377.
