= J. Cheryl Exum =

British feminist biblical scholar (1946–2024)

Professor Emerita Jo Cheryl Exum
- Born: May 1946
- Died: November 13, 2024 (aged 78)

Academic background
- Education: Wake Forest University; Columbia University

Academic work
- Discipline: Biblical studies
- School or tradition: Feminism
- Institutions: Boston College; University of Sheffield
- Notable students: Katie B. Edwards

Jo Cheryl Exum (May 1946 – 13 November 2024) was a feminist biblical scholar. She was Emeritus Professor at the University of Sheffield.

== Education and career ==
Exum studied at Wake Forest University, where she received her BA, and Columbia University, where she received her MA and PhD. Previously, she taught at Boston College. She served as part of the translation team for the New Revised Standard Version. While at Sheffield, Exum was director of the university's Centre for the Study of the Bible in the Modern World. In 2004, Exum co-founded Sheffield Phoenix Press, an academic publisher of books in biblical studies, with David J. A. Clines and Keith W. Whitelam.

Exum held a number of leadership positions in academia, including president of the Society for Old Testament Study. She was the editor of a number of journals in her field. She was the executive editor of Biblical Interpretation for more than a decade and co-edited the journal Biblical Reception.

In 2011, a Festschrift was published in her honour. A Critical Engagement: Essays on the Hebrew Bible in Honour of J. Cheryl Exum (ISBN 1907534334) included contributions by David Clines, Ellen van Wolde, and Michael Fox. On January 30, 2015, Exum received an honorary doctorate from the faculty of theology at Uppsala University.

She died on 13 November 2024.

== Selected works ==
=== Books ===
- Exum, J. Cheryl (1992). Tragedy and biblical narrative : arrows of the Almighty. Cambridge, England & New York, NY: Cambridge University Press. ISBN 978-0-5214-1073-1. OCLC 24246582.
- ———; Clines, David J. A. (1993). The New Literary Criticism and the Hebrew Bible. Journal for the Study of the Old Testament - Supplement series. Vol. 143. Sheffield, England: JSOT Press. ISBN 978-1-8507-5424-4. OCLC 29426176.
- ——— (1993). Fragmented Women: feminist (sub)versions of biblical narratives. Journal for the Study of the Old Testament - Supplement series. Vol. 163. Sheffield, England: JSOT Press. ISBN 978-1-5633-8018-1. OCLC 28148470.
- ——— (1996). Plotted, Shot, and Painted: cultural representations of biblical women. Journal for the Study of the Old Testament - Supplement series. Vol. 215. Sheffield, England: Sheffield Academic Press. ISBN 978-1-8507-5592-0. OCLC 36220021.
- ———, ed. (1999). Beyond the Biblical Horizon: The Bible and the Arts. Leiden: Brill. ISBN 978-9-0041-1290-2.
- ——— (2005). Song of Songs: a commentary. Old Testament Library. Louisville, KY: Westminster, John Knox Press. ISBN 978-0-6642-2190-4. OCLC 58789333.
- Exum, J. Cheryl (2007). Between the Text and the Canvas: The Bible and Art in Dialogue. Society for Biblical Literature. ISBN 9781906055912.
- Exum, J. Cheryl (2019). Art as Biblical Commentary: Visual Criticism from Hagar the Wife of Abraham to Mary the Mother of Jesus. London: T&T Clark. ISBN 9780567685186.
