= Bodner =

Bodner is a surname. Notable people with the surname include:

- Joseph Bodner (1925–1982), American painter
- Keith Bodner (born 1967), Canadian scholar
- Yisroel Pinchos Bodner, author of several books on Jewish Law
