= John J. Ahn =

Korean-American scholar

- Born: New York City, New York, U.S.
- Known for: First Asian American to earn doctorate in Old Testament from Yale University; Korean American biblical hermeneutics

Academic background
- Education: New York University (BA); Princeton Theological Seminary (M.Div.); Yale Divinity School (STM, Ph.D.)
- Thesis: (2006)
- Doctoral advisor: Brevard Childs; Robert R. Wilson

Academic work
- Institutions: Howard University School of Divinity; Austin Presbyterian Theological Seminary; Northwest Baptist Church (Austin, TX)

John J. Ahn is a Korean-American scholar of the Hebrew Bible.

== Biography ==
Ahn grew up in the boroughs of New York City. He received his BA from New York University, M.Div. from Princeton Theological Seminary, and, from Yale Divinity School, an STM and Ph.D. Pursuing his Ph.D. under Brevard Childs and Robert R. Wilson, and bringing together canonical and sociological methods, in December 2006 Ahn became the first Asian American or Korean American to complete a doctorate in the Old Testament from Yale University.

Ahn worked for five years as Senior Pastor of Northwest Baptist Church (Austin, TX) and taught at Austin Presbyterian Theological Seminary, before taking up a position teaching at Howard University, School of Divinity (Washington, DC), where he is presently an associate professor of Hebrew Bible. Ahn is also ordained in the Korean Presbyterian Church and also works as a Cooperative Youth Ministry Leader at Christ Congregational Church (Silver Spring, MD).

His scholarly work draws on sociological, literary, and theological approaches, and he has also worked on Korean American biblical hermeneutics.

As part of the Society of Biblical Literature's Mid-Atlantic region, Ahn was elected as the 2020-2021 Vice President and the 2021-2022 President.

== Works ==
- Ahn, John J.; Cook, Stephen L., eds. (2009). Thus Says the LORD: Essays on the Former and Latter Prophets in Honor of Robert R. Wilson. A&C Black. ISBN 978-0-567-17804-6.
- Ahn, John J. (2010). Exile as Forced Migrations: A Sociological, Literary, and Theological Approach on the Displacement and Resettlement of the Southern Kingdom of Judah. Walter de Gruyter. ISBN 978-3-11-024096-2.
- Ahn, John J.; Middlemas, Jill, eds. (2012). By the Irrigation Canals of Babylon: Approaches to the Study of the Exile. A&C Black. ISBN 978-0-567-52894-0.
- Ahn, John J., ed. (2019). Landscapes of Korean and Korean American Biblical Interpretation. Society of Biblical Literature. ISBN 978-1-62837-246-5.
