= Samuel Bak =

Lithuanian-American painter, writer, and Holocaust educator

Samuel Bak שמואל בק
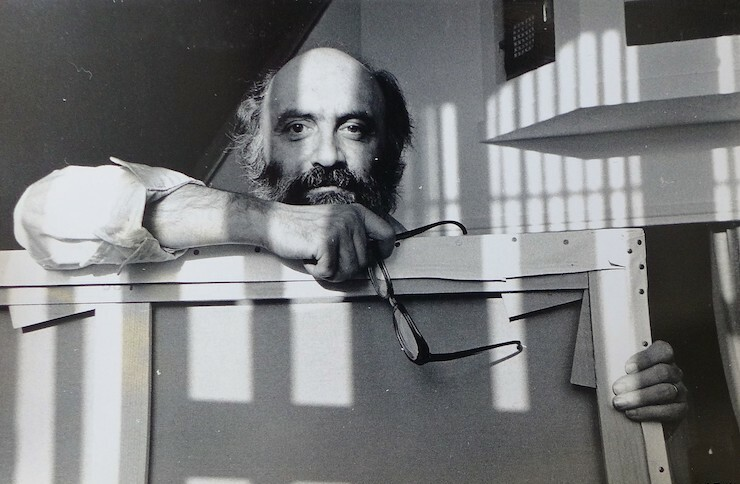
- Portrait of Samuel Bak in his Paris studio in 1983
- Born: 12 August 1933 (age 93); Wilno, Second Polish Republic
- Education: Bezalel Academy of Arts and Design, École des Beaux-Arts
- Known for: Painting, Author
- Spouse: Josee

Samuel Bak (Hebrew: שמואל בק; born 12 August 1933) is an American-Jewish painter and writer who survived the Holocaust and immigrated to Israel in 1948. Since 1993, he has lived in the United States.

== Biography ==
Samuel Bak was born in Wilno (Vilnius), Second Polish Republic, on August 12, 1933. Bak was recognized from an early age as having artistic talent. He describes his family as secular, but proud of their Jewish identity.

By 1939, when Bak was six years old, World War II began and Vilnius was transferred from Poland to Lithuania, and later to the Soviet Union. When German troops occupied Vilius on June 24, 1941, after Operation Barbarossa, Bak and his family were forced to move into the Vilna Ghetto. At the age of nine, he held his first exhibition inside the ghetto. In 1943 the poets Avrom Sutzkever and Szmerke Kaczerginski invited the young Bak to participate in an exhibition organized in the ghetto. Sensing that their end is near, the poets decide to deposit the Pinkas, the official record of the Jewish community, into the hands of Bak in the hope that they both survive. Over the next two years, Samuel fills the page margins and empty pages of the Pinkas.

Bak and his mother sought refuge in a Benedictine convent where a Catholic nun named Maria Mikulska tried to help them. After returning to the ghetto, they were to be deported to a forced labour camp, but took shelter again in the convent where they remained in hiding until the end of the war.

By the end of the war, Samuel and his mother were the only members of his extensive family to survive. in July 1944, his father Jonas was shot by the Germans, only a few days before Samuel's own liberation. As Bak described the situation, "when in 1944 the Soviets liberated us, we were two among two hundred of Vilna's survivors—from a community that had counted 70 or 80 thousand." Bak and his mother, as pre-war Polish citizens, were allowed to leave Soviet-occupied Vilnius and travel to central Poland, at first settling briefly in Łódź. They soon left Poland and traveled into the American-occupied zone of Germany.

From 1945 to 1948, he and his mother lived in displaced persons camps in West Germany. He spent most of this period at the Landsberg am Lech DP camp. It was there he painted a self-portrait shortly before repudiating his Bar Mitzvah ceremony. Bak also studied painting in Munich during this period, and painted A Mother and Son, 1947, which evokes some of his dark memories of the Holocaust and escape from Soviet-occupied Poland.

In 1948, Bak and his mother immigrated to Israel. In 1952, he studied art at the Bezalel Academy of Arts and Design in Jerusalem. After serving in the Israel Defense Forces, he continued his studies in Paris from 1956 at the École nationale supérieure des Beaux-Arts He spent various periods of time in Rome, Paris, Switzerland and Israel.

In 1993, he and his wife Josee moved to Boston, where they settled permanently and became U.S. citizens. Bak continues creating new art and exhibits.

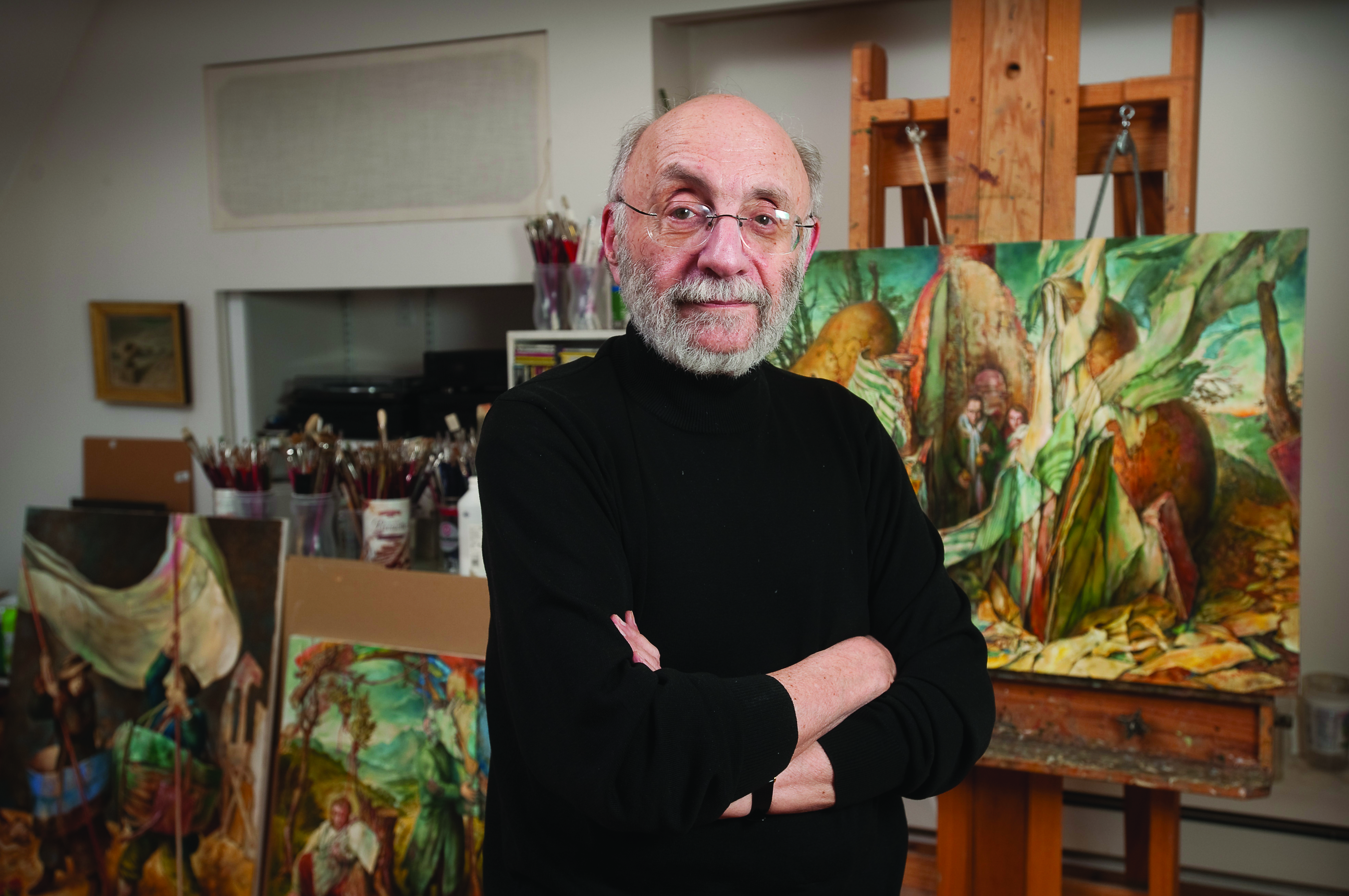
Bak in his Massachusetts studio

In 2001, Bak returned to Vilnius for the first time since his youth and has visited his hometown several times since then.

== Artistic style and influences ==
The Family, oil on canvas, 1974

Samuel Bak's art has elements of post-modernism, as he employs different styles and visual vernaculars, i.e. surrealism (Salvador Dalí, René Magritte), analytical cubism (Picasso), pop art (Andy Warhol, Roy Lichtenstein) and quotations from the old masters. The artist never paints direct scenes of mass death. Instead, he employs allegory, metaphor and certain artistic devices such as substitution: toys instead of the murdered children who played with them, books, instead of the people who read them. Further devices are quotations of iconographical prototypes, i.e. Michelangelo's Creation of Adam (1511/12) on the Sistine Ceiling or Albrecht Dürer's famous engraving entitled Melancholia (1516). In the late 1980s, Bak opened up about his paintings, stating they convey "a sense of a world that was shattered."

In his piece entitled Trains, Bak creates a vast grey landscape with large mounts creating the structure of a train. Massive taper candles burn in the distance further down the train tracks, surrounding an eruption. The smoke from the candles and volcano pour into a sky of dark ominous clouds that lurk over the landscape. Here Bak has created a whole new meaning for "trains". Many of Bak’s pieces incorporate aspects of Jewish culture and the holocaust with a dark and creative twist, such as Shema Yisrael, Alone, and Ghetto.

In Bak’s 2011 series featuring Adam and Eve (which comprised 125 paintings, drawings and mixed media works), the artist casts the first couple as lone survivors of a biblical narrative of a God who birthed humanity and promised never to destroy it. Unable to make good on the greatest of all literary promises, God becomes another one of the relics that displaced persons carry around with them in the disorienting aftermath of world war. Viewers often describe Bak as a tragedian, but if classical tragedy describes the fall of royal families, Bak narrates the disintegration and disillusion of the chosen people. Bak draws upon the biblical heroes of the Genesis story, yet he is more preoccupied with the visual legacy of the creation story as immortalized by Italian and North Renaissance artists.

Bak continues to deal with the artistic expression of the destruction and dehumanization which make up his childhood memories. He speaks about what are deemed to be the unspeakable atrocities of the Holocaust, though he hesitates to limit the boundaries of his art to the post-Holocaust genre.

Samuel Bak uses his art to teach and enlighten the public. “Holocaust was a laboratory which tells you that human beings can do the best and the worst. It is not because they are born very good or very evil – there's no such thing. But they are brought up in very different ways,” the painter says in a June 2022 interview. “It is my duty to help not let such horrors happen again.”

== Selected publications ==
- Samuel Bak, Paintings of the Last Decade, A. Kaufman and Paul T. Nagano. Aberbach, New York, 1974.
- Samuel Bak, Monuments to Our Dreams, Rolf Kallenbach. Limes Verlag, Weisbaden & Munich, 1977.
- Samuel Bak, The Past Continues, Samuel Bak and Paul T. Nagano. David R. Godine, Boston, 1988
- Chess as Metaphor in the Art of Samuel Bak, Jean Louis Cornuz. Pucker Art Publications, Boston & C.A. Olsommer, Montreux, 1991.
- Ewiges Licht (Landsberg: A Memoir 1944-1948), Samuel Bak. Jewish Museum, Frankfurt, Germany, 1996.
- Landscapes of Jewish Experience, Lawrence Langer. Pucker Art Publications, Boston & University Press of New England, Hanover, 1997.
- Samuel Bak – Retrospective, Bad Frankenhausen Museum, Bad Frankenhausen, Germany, 1998.
- The Game Continues: Chess in the Art of Samuel Bak, Pucker Art Publications, Boston & Indiana University Press, Bloomington, 2000.
- In A Different Light: The Book of Genesis in the Art of Samuel Bak, Lawrence Langer. Pucker Art Publications, Boston & University of Washington Press, Seattle, 2001.
- The Art of Speaking About the Unspeakable, TV Film by Rob Cooper. Pucker Art Publications, Boston, 2001.
- Between Worlds: Paintings and Drawings by Samuel Bak from 1946-2001, Pucker Art Publications, Boston, 2002.
- Painted in Words: A Memoir, Samuel Bak. Pucker Art Publications, Boston & Indiana University Press, Bloomington, 2002.
- Samuel Bak: Painter of Questions, TV Film by Christa Singer. Toronto, Canada, 2003.
- New Perceptions of Old Appearances in the Art of Samuel Bak, Lawrence Langer. Pucker Art Publications, Boston & Syracuse University Press, Syracuse, 2005.
- Samuel Bak: Life Thereafter, Eva Atlan and Peter Junk. Felix Nussbaum Haus & Rasch, Verlag, Bramsche, Osnabrueck, Germany, 2006.
- Return to Vilna in the Art of Samuel Bak, Lawrence Langer. Pucker Art Publications, Boston & Syracuse University Press, Syracuse, 2007.
- Representing the Irreparable: The Shoah, the Bible, and the Art of Samuel Bak, Danna Nolan Fewell, Gary A. Phillips and Yvonne Sherwood, Eds. Pucker Art Publications, Boston, and Syracuse University Press, Syracuse, 2008.
- Icon of Loss: The Haunting Child of Samuel Bak, Danna Nolan Fewell and Gary A. Phillips. Pucker Art Publications, Boston, and Syracuse University Press, Syracuse, 2009.
- Retrospective Journey into the art of Samuel Bak. Ute Ben Yosef. The South African Jewish Museum. Cape Town, 2013.
- Told & Foretold: The Cup in the Art of Samuel Bak, Lawrence L. Langer. Pucker Art Publications, Boston, and Syracuse University Press, Syracuse, 2014.
- From Generation to Generation: Paintings by Samuel Bak, Lawrence L. Langer. Pucker Art Publications, Boston, and Syracuse University Press, Syracuse, 2016.
- Just Is: New Paintings by Samuel Bak, Gary A. Phillips and John K. Roth. Pucker Art Publications, Boston, and Syracuse University Press, Syracuse, 2018.
- Ner Ot: Candles in the Art of Samuel Bak, Lawrence L. Langer. Pucker Art Publications, Boston, and Syracuse University Press, Syracuse, 2019.
- Remembering: The Gifts of Samuel Bak, Lawrence L. Langer and Ayala Tamir. Pucker Art Publications, Boston, and Holocaust Museum, Houston, 2019.
- When the Rainbow Breaks: HOPE in the Art of Samuel Bak, Henry F. Knight. Pucker Art Publications, Boston, and Syracuse University Press, Syracuse, 2022.
- An Unimaginable Partnership: The Art of Samuel Bak and the Writings of Lawrence L. Langer, Lawrence L. Langer. Pucker Art Publications, Boston, 2022.
- Figuring Out: Paintings by Samuel Bak 2017-2022, Lawrence L. Langer and Andrew Meyers. Pucker Art Publications, Boston, and Syracuse University Press, Syracuse, 2022.
- Art & Life: The Story of Samuel Bak, Ute Ben Yosef. Pucker Art Publications, Boston, and Syracuse University Press, Syracuse, 2023.
- Question of LifE: New Work by Samuel Bak, Carl M. Herbert. Pucker Art Publications, Boston, and Syracuse University Press, Syracuse, 2026.

== See also ==
- Visual arts in Israel
