= Gerald H. Wilson =

American Old Testament scholar

Gerald Henry Wilson (1945 – 11 November 2005) was an American Old Testament scholar. He served as professor of Old Testament and Biblical Hebrew at Azusa Pacific University.

Wilson studied at Baylor University, Fuller Theological Seminary, and Yale University. At Yale, he studied under Brevard S. Childs, and was influenced by him to adopt a canonical approach to the biblical text. Wilson taught at the University of Georgia, George Fox University, the University of Portland, and Western Evangelical Seminary before being appointed professor of Old Testament and Biblical Hebrew at Azusa Pacific University.

Wilson was best known for his work on the Book of Psalms. He focused on the way the Psalter was divided into five books, and argued that the Psalms around the divisions – what he called the "seams" of the Psalter – concerned the Davidic dynasty and covenant. Yee Von Koh suggests that Wilson was "the first to apply canonical criticism to the study of the Psalter in the clearest and most comprehensive way," while Harry P. Nasuti says that Wilson's "groundbreaking work on the shape of the Psalter has been particularly influential for later scholarship on the subject."

Wilson died of a heart attack on 11 November 2005.
