= David M. Gunn =

Australian religious scholar

David Gunn
- Born: David Miller Gunn

Academic background
- Education: University of Melbourne; University of Otago; Newcastle University

Academic work
- Sub-discipline: Hebrew Bible; Old Testament
- Institutions: Texas Christian University (current); University of Sheffield; Columbia Theological Seminary

David Miller Gunn is an academic and religious scholar. He is the A. A. Bradford Professor of Religion at Texas Christian University.

== Education ==
Gunn studied at the University of Melbourne, the University of Otago, and Newcastle University.

== Career ==
He has served as a professor of Religious Studies at the University of Sheffield and at Columbia Theological Seminary.

In collaboration with biblical scholar David J. A. Clines, Gunn made the University of Sheffield a leading institution in literary readings of the final form of the biblical text. Followers of this approach are sometimes referred to as the "Sheffield school". According to Ken Stone, Gunn's 1978 work, The Story of King David: Genre and Interpretation, has become "one of the most influential early attempts at a 'literary' approach to the Hebrew Bible."

Gunn has enjoyed a successful association with Danna Nolan Fewell, with whom he has co-authored several articles and three books: Compromising Redemption: Relating Characters in the Book of Ruth; Gender, Power, and Promise: The Subject of the Bible's First Story; and Narrative in the Hebrew Bible. Fewell and Gunn represent a postmodern literary approach to biblical literature.
