= On the Historicity of Jesus =

2014 book by Richard Carrier

- Book Cover
- Author: Richard Carrier
- Language: English
- Subject: Historical Jesus; Early Christianity; Historiography; Bayesian inference
- Genre: Nonfiction
- Publisher: Sheffield Phoenix Press
- Publication date: 2014
- Publication place: United States
- Media type: Print, e book
- Pages: xiv + 696
- ISBN: 978-1909697492

On the Historicity of Jesus: Why We Might Have Reason for Doubt is a peer-reviewed academic study by American historian Richard Carrier that examines the probability that Jesus of Nazareth existed as a historical person using Bayesian reasoning on background knowledge and surviving evidence. The book was published by Sheffield Phoenix Press, an academic biblical studies publisher, in June 2014 and revised in 2023. The book compares a 'minimal-historicity model' to a 'minimal-mythicism model', and argues that the view of Jesus not being a historical figure, a fringe view, explains the evidence at least as well as the former or better.

== Methodology and hypotheses ==
Carrier states that the "historicity of Jesus Christ is currently the default consensus" and characterizes it as "near-universal consensus of well-qualified experts".

Carrier defines two competing hypotheses, estimates priors from background knowledge about ancient religion and historiography, then updates with likelihoods derived from the surviving record. The study inventories features of Greco Roman religious movements, Jewish apocalyptic expectations, scriptural interpretation practices, and information spread in urban networks, and evaluates how these variables affect the probability of each hypothesis. Carrier surveys Greco Roman hero cults, Jewish wisdom and martyr traditions, diaspora synagogue networks, and the mechanics of textual production and oral performance. He argues that Pauline letters center on a revealed Christ, that earliest language about Jesus aligns with celestial conceptions, and that the Gospels function as literary constructions that embed scriptural allusion and midrash to craft recent biography, which can be expected if a mythic origin was later placed in history.

The book employs Bayes' theorem for historical inference by separating background frequencies from evidence specific likelihoods, then by computing which model receives the greater posterior support. The framework emphasizes reference class reasoning, prior sensitivity analysis, and comparative prediction of what kinds of sources should survive if each hypothesis were true.

Carrier contends that early Christians believed Jesus was an archangelic being that emerged from a "cosmic sperm bank", was tortured and crucified by Satan and his demons, buried above the clouds, and resurrected in outer space.

== Reception ==
Contemporary academic reception has been mostly critical of his views. Raphael Lataster reviewed the book in the Journal of Religious History, outlining Carrier's model comparison and situating it within debates over Jesus' historicity.

Christina Petterson reviewed the volume in the journal, Relegere: Studies in Religion and Reception. She states Carrier displays "ignorance of the field of New Testament studies and early Christianity" and that his views come from his "confessed atheism and flies in the face of the fundamentalist drive of the book to disprove the historical Jesus." She also challenged the use of Bayesian devices and judged the book's New Testament discussions to be basic, writing that "even if strictly correct, the methodology is tenuous. The numbers and the statistics seem like a diversion."

Marko Marina, an ancient historian, states that Carrier's work is guided by his ideological agenda, not by serious historical work, and criticizes his views of early Christianity as lacking of positive evidences from primary sources and notes that his mythicist views have not won any supporters from critical scholars.

Historian Daniel N. Gullotta, published a 37-page response in the Journal for the Study of the Historical Jesus. He summarized Carrier's thesis and concluded that "Carrier's hypothesis is problematic and unpersuasive," while critiquing specific probability assignments and readings of early sources. He also criticized Carrier's view that earliest Christians believed Jesus some sort of celestial or angelic being and notes that the work's ideology is related to Carrier atheistic views. In 2021, the journal subsequently openly published his response for non-academics to read.

In 2025, Gregor et al, with backgrounds in statistics and classical Roman literature, questioned Carrier's methodology and found that it produced many historical figures, not mythical ones. In using more samples from post-10th century BC (closer to the time of Jesus), rather than the small sample Carrier used from pre-10th century BC (farther away from the time of Jesus), the calculated probability of Jesus' historicity increased from 33% (Carrier) to 99% (corrected). Further research, increased the number of samples of raglan heroes being historical instead of mythical, increasing even further probability of Jesus being historical.

Subsequent research articles also addressed core premises of mythicist reconstructions. Simon Gathercole argued in the Journal for the Study of the Historical Jesus that the undisputed Pauline letters presuppose a historical and human Jesus, positioning this as a counter to mythicist claims.

M. David Litwa notes that Carrier portrays himself "as a kind of crusader fighting for the truth of secular humanism", whose mission it is "to prove Christianity (or Carrier's understanding of it) wrong." He also notes that "Carrier's cavalier dismissal of the Bible and animosity toward the biblical deity would not seem to predispose him for careful biblical scholarship." Litwa describes Carrier as "on the fringes of the academic guild", although he is a trained scholar and does employ scholarly methods. Litwa writes that Carrier's application of the Rank-Raglan mythotype to Jesus relies on forced similarities and that "the pattern ignores major elements of [Jesus's] life." He also criticizes Carrier's attempts to derive Jesus from James Frazer's theory of the Near-Eastern dying-and-rising fertility god as relying on a "largely defunct" category in religious scholarship. He notes that few gods die and rise, usually staying dead in some way. Although Litwa acknowledges a parallel between the suffering experienced by dying deities and Jesus's suffering, he argues that pagan dying deities do not choose to die as Jesus does. Regarding Carrier's appeals to other ancient religious figures such as Romulus and the prophet Daniel who appear not to have existed, Litwa argues that Jesus is attested only twenty years after his death by Paul: "A name and a human character to go with it could not have been invented in this short period without invoking suspicion." Litwa dismisses Carrier's hypothesis that Paul's Jesus was an angelic being crucified on the celestial plane as relying on "baseless" speculation that the second-century Ascension of Isaiah was available to Paul and that its mention of Jesus's birth on earth and his crucifixion in Jerusalem are later additions, despite scholarship to the contrary.

James McGrath contests Carrier's usage Rank-Raglan archetypes since even fictional non-royal figures score low by default and thus would be misclassified as "historical", while historical rulers will start off with a number of points automatically which would make them more likely to be misclassified as "mythical." For instance, Czar Nicholas II was historical and scored high and Harry Potter was clearly fictional and yet scored lower.

James McGrath notes that Carrier's view of a celestial Jesus dying in outer space, never on earth, comes from a mythicist interpretation of Ascension of Isaiah and was central to Earl Doherty's mythicist view. McGrath states that the text is a later text that includes a descent to earth and fits more with a Docetic view than mythicism. In another review, McGrath notes that Carrier's high dependence on allegorical interpretations for his hypothesis make the work "unfalsifiable, and thus scarcely worthy of serious scholarly discussion."

Professor Emeritus Larry Hurtado of the University of Edinburgh writes that, contrary to Carrier's claims, Philo of Alexandria never refers to an archangel named "Jesus." Hurtado also states that the Apostle Paul clearly believed Jesus to have been a real man who lived on earth, and that the deities of pagan saviour cults, such as Isis and Osiris, were not transformed in their devotees' ideas from heavenly deities to actual people living on earth. He states that Carrier’s thesis displays a lack of expertise in relevant fields.

Christopher Hansen observed that Carrier believes Jews already believed in a preexisting supernatural son of God named Jesus based on Philo's interpretation of Zech. 6:12. However, Hansen argues that his argument relies on weak arguments and no evidence. He states, following Daniel Gullotta, "there is not a single instance of a recorded celestial angel or Logos figure named Jesus/Joshua in ancient Jewish literature."

Christopher Hansen criticizes Carrier's methodology as extensively problematic, arbitrary, and notes that that he misuses and manipulates Raglan's scale to make Jesus appear more aligned with a mythotype by scoring him high, thus more mythical, when other scholars have scored Jesus as low, thus more historical. He thinks selection bias tarnishes Carrier's calculations and states "Carrier’s supposition that Jesus would only have a 33 per cent prior probability of being historical is fallacious." Upon testing Raglan heroes, historical figures regularly become Raglan heroes which casts doubts on the usefulness of the Raglan scale for historicity such that "it seems prudent to abandon the application of the Raglan hero pattern to Jesus."

== Sources ==
- Litwa, M. David (2019). How The Gospels Became History : Jesus and Mediterranean myths. New Haven: Yale University Press. ISBN 978-0300242638.
