= Sheffield Phoenix Press =

British academic publisher

- Status: Active
- Founded: 2004
- Founder: David J. A. Clines
- Country of origin: United Kingdom
- Headquarters location: Sheffield
- Distribution: Worldwide
- Publication types: Books
- Nonfiction topics: Biblical Studies
- Official website: http://www.sheffieldphoenix.com

Sheffield Phoenix Press Ltd. (SPP) is an independent academic publisher specializing in biblical studies. It was launched in January 2004.

SPP's main series of titles are Hebrew Bible Monographs, New Testament Monographs and Bible in the Modern World. It also has four commentary series, Critical Commentaries, Readings, Text of the Hebrew Bible and Trauma Bible. Its staff are its directors, David J. A. Clines and Jeremy M.S. Clines, together with its manager Louise A. Clines..

Since its inception, SPP has published about 340 titles, including monographs, collective volumes, Festschriften, and a handful of dissertations each year. Its authors come from the United Kingdom, as well as Bulgaria, Denmark, Finland, France, Germany, Hungary, Ireland, Italy, Netherlands, Norway, Switzerland and Sweden, plus Australia, Argentina, Canada, Israel, Japan, Mexico, New Zealand, South Korea, South Africa, Taiwan and the USA.

All authors are promised that their work will be kept in print indefinitely.

Sheffield Phoenix Press exhibits its titles at the Annual and International Meetings of the Society of Biblical Literature, as well as at the meetings of the Society for Old Testament Study in the UK and more recently at SNTS and EABS. Customers can order directly from the publisher, which prints its books through Lightning Source in the UK, the USA and Australia. The Society of Biblical Literature is its North American distributor.

== Publications ==
2020

- Claassens, Writing and Reading to Survive: Biblical and Contemporary Trauma Narratives in Conversation
- Kirova, Performing Masculinity in the Hebrew Bible
- Neyrey, An Encomium for Jesus: Luke, Rhetoric, and the Story of Jesus
- Paynter and Spallione, The Bible on Violence: A Thick Description

2019

- Avalos, The Reality of Religious Violence: From Biblical to Modern Times
- Clines, The Dictionary of Classical Hebrew Revised. II. Beth-Waw
- Nir, The First Christian Believer: In Search of John the Baptist
- Vaillancourt, The Multifaceted Saviour of Psalms 110 and 118

2017

- Clines, The Dictionary of Classical Hebrew Revised. I. Aleph

2016

- Tonstad, The Letter to the Romans: Paul among the Ecologists
- Wainwright, Habitat, Human, and Holy: An Eco-Rhetorical Reading of the Gospel of Matthew
- Clines, The Dictionary of Classical Hebrew. IX: English-Hebrew Index
- Scholz, Feminist Interpretation of the Hebrew Bible in Retrospect. III. Methods

2015

- Avalos, The Bad Jesus: The Ethics of New Testament Ethics
- Adelman, The Female Ruse: Women’s Deception and Divine Sanction in the Hebrew Bible
- Porter, The Letter to the Romans: A Linguistic and Literary Commentary
- Charney, Persuading God: Rhetorical Studies of First-Person Psalms

2014

- Carrier, On the Historicity of Jesus: Why We Might Have Reason for Doubt
- Korpel and de Moor, Adam, Eve, and the Devil: A New Beginning
- Overland, Learning Biblical Hebrew Interactively
- Spellman, Toward a Canon-Conscious Reading of the Bible: Exploring the History and Hermeneutics of the Canon

2013

- Markl, The Decalogue and its Cultural Influence
- Lundbom, Biblical Rhetoric and Rhetorical Criticism
- Scholz, Feminist Interpretation of the Hebrew Bible in Retrospect. I. Biblical Books
- Zehnder and Hagelia, Encountering Violence in the Bible

2012

- Brodie, Beyond the Quest for the Historical Jesus: Memoir of a Discovery
- Beavis and Gilmour, Dictionary of the Bible and Western Culture
- Carey, The Gospel according to Luke: All Flesh Shall See God's Salvation
- Berges, The Book of Isaiah: Its Composition and Final Form

2011

- Leung Lai, Through the 'I'-Window: The Inner Life of Characters in the Hebrew Bible
- Heacock, Jonathan Loved David: Manly Love in the Bible and the Hermeneutics of Sex
- Avalos, Slavery, Abolitionism, and the Ethics of Biblical Scholarship
- Trevaskis, Holiness, Ethics and Ritual in Leviticus

2010

- O’Kane & Morgan, Biblical Art from Wales
- Putnam, A New Grammar of Biblical Hebrew
- Gray, The Book of Job
- Lundbom, Jeremiah Closer Up: The Prophet & the Book

2009

- Barker, On Earth as it is in Heaven: Temple Symbolism in the New Testament
- Wallace, Psalms (Readings)
- Goulder, Five Stones and a Sling: Memoirs of a Biblical Scholar
- Johnson, Now my Eye Sees You: Unveiling an Apocalyptic Job

2008

- Barker, The Gate of Heaven: The History & Symbolism of the Temple in Jerusalem
- Bodner, 1 Samuel: A Narrative Commentary
- Brett, Decolonizing God: The Bible in the Tides of Empire
- Fontaine, With Eyes of Flesh: The Bible, Gender and Human Rights

2007

- Exum & Nutu, Between the Text and the Canvas: The Bible and Art in Dialogue
- O’Kane, Painting the Text: The Artist as Biblical Interpreter
- Ogden, Qoheleth, Second Edition
- Rooke, A Question of Sex? Gender and Difference in the Hebrew Bible and Beyond

2006

- Moore, Empire & Apocalypse: Postcolonialism & the NT
- Schaberg, The Illegitimacy of Jesus: A Feminist Theological Interpretation of the Infancy Narratives, Expanded Twentieth Anniversary Edition
- Morrow, Protest against God: The Eclipse of a Biblical Tradition
- Holloway, Orientalism, Assyriology and the Bible

2005

- Barker, The Lost Prophet: The Book of Enoch and its Influence on Christianity
- Barker, The Older Testament: The Survival of Themes from the Ancient Royal Cult in Sectarian Judaism and Early Christianity
- Clines, The Bible and the Modern World
- Scaer, The Lukan Passion and the Praiseworthy Death
