= Ellen van Wolde =

Dutch biblical scholar (born 1954)

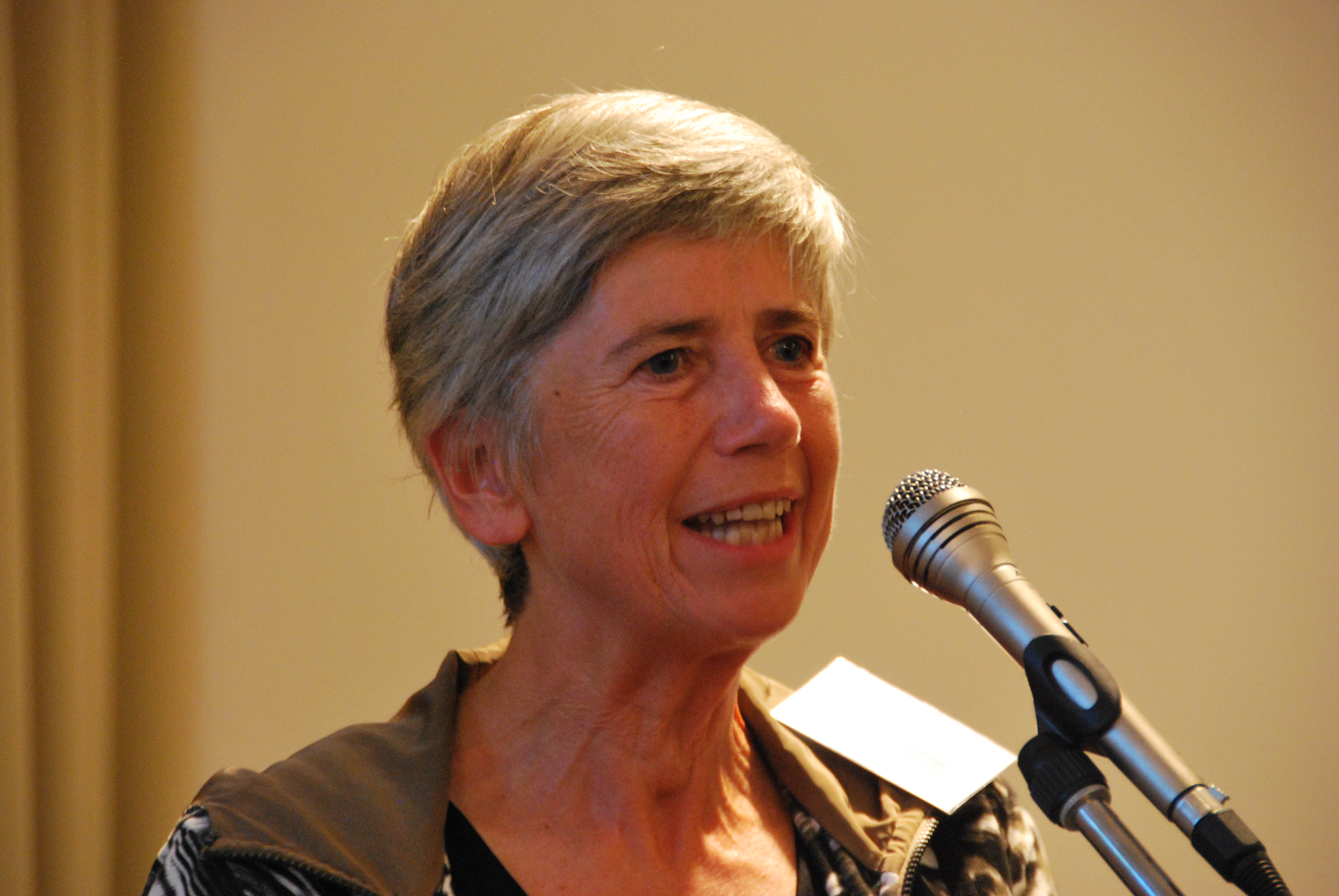
- Ellen van Wolde
- Born: 1954; Groningen (NL)
- Occupation: Biblical scholar

Ellen José van Wolde (born 1954) is a Dutch biblical scholar. In her research she focuses mainly on the Hebrew Bible, applying achievements of semiotics and linguistics. She became known to the general public mainly through her oration (2009) on the first three sentences of the book of Genesis. Since the summer of 2021 she is Emeritus Professor at the Radboud University Nijmegen.

== Education ==
Van Wolde studied theology at the Catholic University Nijmegen, Biblical studies at the Pontificium Institutum Biblicum in Rome, and semiotics at the Università degli Studi di Bologna. She completed her Master's in Theology (cum laude) and her PhD in Biblical Studies (cum laude).

== Career and research ==
Van Wolde was given an appointment as assistant professor at the Catholic University of Nijmegen. She later became associate professor there. In 1992, at the age of 37, she was appointed Professor of Exegesis of the Old Testament and Hebrew at the Tilburg Theological Faculty, which was later incorporated into Tilburg University. In 2009, she was appointed Professor of Old Testament Exegesis/Hebrew Bible and Source Texts Judaism at Radboud University Nijmegen. There she headed the Department of Bible Studies (from 2010 to 2020) and from 2020 to 2021 the (merged) Department of Textual, Historical, and Systematic Studies of Judaism and Christianity (2020–2021) at Radboud University. She retired in the summer of 2021.

Ellen van Wolde is a Biblical scholar and researches the Hebrew Bible in the context of the Ancient Near East. Her focus is on ideas about the beginning of the universe, about God and about people. She investigates these concepts through language and text research in close connection with the culture and cognition (the mental processes) of people in the Ancient Near East. In doing so, she strives to uncover the thought processes and language use of people in the time, place, and culture in which the texts originated. Her insights are captured in her monograph Reframing Biblical Studies. When Language and Text Meet Cognition, Culture and Context and in the articles she has published, among others on the first verses of the Bible (the verb ‘bara’), on the flood story and ‘the rainbow’ after the flood, on ‘the Jacob's Ladder’ and on ‘Sodom and Gomorrah’.

== Awards and honours ==
In 2005, Van Wolde was elected a member of the Royal Netherlands Academy of Arts and Sciences (KNAW). In 2006, she was elected a member of the Royal Holland Society of Sciences & Humanities (KHMW). She was nominated and elected a member of Academia Europaea/Academy of Europe in 2013. From 2010 to 2016 she was a member of the General Board of the KNAW. In 2011 she was appointed Knight of the Order of the Netherlands Lion.

On the occasion of the bicentenary of the KNAW, the six-part series "The Magic of Science" was made where one of the documentaries is dedicated to her.

== Selected works ==
=== Books and Papers ===
- A semiotic analysis of Genesis 2–3. A semiotic theory and method of analysis applied to the story of the Garden of Eden (Assen 1989; also published as dissertation RU Nijmegen)
- Meneer en mevrouw Job. Job in gesprek met zijn vrouw, zijn vrienden en met God (Baarn 1991, 1995)
- Ruth en Noömi, twee vreemdgangers (Baarn 1993)
- Words become Worlds. Semantic Studies of Genesis 1–11 (Leiden 1994)
- Verhalen over het begin. Genesis 1–11 en andere scheppingsverhalen (Baarn 1995)
- Zin in verhalen (onder redactie van Ellen van Wolde) (Amsterdam 1997; Annalen van het Thijmgenootschap, 85/2)
- Een topografie van de geest. Een verkenningstocht door het landschap van taal en betekenis, denken en geloven (Nijmegen 2000; Annalen van het Thijmgenootschap, 88/4 (Thijm-essay 2000))
- Bas van Iersel, Uitgelezen. Studies over de evangelies, ed. Ellen van Wolde (Baarn 2000)
- Does 'innâ Denote Rape? A Semantic Analysis of a Controversial Word, Vetus Testamentum, 52 (2002) 528–544
- Job 28. Cognition in context (Leiden 2003)
- Het paradijs (redactie) (Zoetermeer 2006)
- Sentiments as Culturally Constructed Emotions. Anger and Love in the Hebrew Bible, Biblical Interpretation. A Journal of Contemporary Approaches 16, pp. 1–24 (2008)
- Reframing Biblical Studies. When Language and Text Meet Culture, Cognition, and Context. Eisenbrauns. (Winona Lake 2009)
- Bijbelse scheppingsverhalen, in P. Oomen & T. Smedes (Eds.), Evolutie, cultuur en religie. Perspectieven vanuit biologie en theologie (pp. 57–82), (Kampen: Klement 2010)
- Semantics and the Semantics of bara. A Rejoinder to the Arguments Advanced by B. Becking and M. Korpel, with R.C. Rezetko, Journal of Hebrew Scriptures 11(9) (2011)
- Outcry, Knowledge, and Judgment in Genesis 18–19, In D. Lipton (Ed.), Universalism and Particularism at Sodom and Gomorrah. Essays in Memory of Ron Pirson (pp. 71–100), Atlanta: Society of Biblical Literature (2012)
- One Bow or Another. A study of the bow in Gen 9: 8–17, Vetus Testamentum, 63, pp. 124–149 (2013)
- Landsman, K., en E. van Wolde (eds), The Challenge of Chance. A Multidisciplinary Approach from Science and the Humanities (Springer 2016)
- Separation and Creation In Genesis 1 and Psalm 104, a Continuation of the Discussion of bara, Vetus Testamentum 67 (2017) 611–647
- The Niphal as Middle Voice and its Consequence for Meaning, Journal for the Study of the Old Testament 43 (2019) 453–478. (most downloaded publication of Sage 2019–20)
- Psalm 102: 13–23: Qualifications Rather than Actions, The Bible Translator 70 (2019) 207–222.
- Accusing YHWH of Fickleness: A Study of Psalm 89,47–52, Biblica 100 (2019) 506–526.
- A Stairway to Heaven? Jacob’s Dream in Genesis 28.10–22, Vetus Testamentum 69 (2019) 722–735.
- A network of conventional and deliberate metaphors in Psalm 22, Journal for the Study of the Old Testament 44.4 (2020) 642–666.
- A Prayer for Purification. Psalm 51:12–14, a Pure Heart and the verb ברא , Vetus Testamentum (2020) 340–360.
- Various Types of Metaphors and Their Different Functions in Psalm 51, in D.Verde and A. Labahn (eds), Networks of Metaphors in the Hebrew Bible (BETL CCCIX) Leuven: Peeters 2020, 193–215.
- Niphal verbs in the Book of Genesis and their contribution to meaning, in A. Hornkohl and G. Kahn (eds.), (Semitic Languages and Cultures, 7), (Cambridge University: Open Books Publisher 2021) 431–453.
- Not the Name Alone: A Linguistic Study of Exodus 3:14–15, Vetus Testamentum (2021) 1–17.
