= Christopher Seitz =

American Old Testament scholar and theologian

The Reverend Canon Christopher Seitz
- Born: 22 May 1954 (age 72); Blowing Rock, North Carolina, U.S.

Academic background
- Education: University of North Carolina

Academic work
- Discipline: Theologian
- Sub-discipline: Old Testament; Biblical hermeneutics
- Institutions: Yale University; University of St Andrews; Wycliffe College, Toronto

Ecclesiastical career
- Religion: Christianity
- Church: Episcopalian
- Ordained: 1980 (deacon); 1981 (priest)

Christopher R. Seitz (born 22 May 1954 in Blowing Rock, NC, US) is an American Old Testament scholar and theologian known for his work in biblical interpretation and theological hermeneutics. He is the senior research professor of biblical interpretation at Toronto School of Theology, Wycliffe College. He is also an ordained priest in the Episcopal Church, and served as canon theologian in the Episcopal Diocese of Dallas (2008–2015).

== Education and career ==
Seitz received an AB from the University of North Carolina, in 1976, an MTS from Virginia Theological Seminary, in 1979. He studied at LMU Munich from 1979 until 1980, and received several degrees from Yale University: STM 1981; MA 1982; MPhil 1983; PhD 1986.

He began his teaching career as Assistant Professor of Old Testament at The Lutheran Theological Seminary in Philadelphia (1984–87), before becoming Associate Professor of Old Testament at Yale in 1987. He was Professor of Old Testament at Yale University from 1993-97 and then took a chair at the University of St Andrews (Scotland) in 1998 where he was Professor of Old Testament and Theological Studies at St Mary’s College until 2007. He is presently Senior Research Professor of Biblical interpretation at Wycliffe College at the University of Toronto. He is a co-founder of the Wycliffe Center for Scripture and Theology.

== Academic and ecclesial work ==
Seitz is the author and editor of more than twenty books; he is best known for his volume on Isaiah 1—39 in Interpretation Commentary Series, held in 727 libraries according to WorldCat, and translated into Korean, Japanese and Italian. Other major works include Word Without End, Figured Out, Isaiah 40—66 (New Interpreter’s Bible), Prophecy and Hermeneutics, The Goodly Fellowship of the Prophets, and The Character of Christian Scripture. Recently, he has written a commentary on Colossians for the Brazos Theological Commentary series (2014), in which the place of the book in a wider Letter Collection is evaluated. A commentary on Joel for the new International Theological Commentary series appeared in 2016. Additionally, he has contributed more than sixty articles to journals and publications, including Journal of Biblical Literature, Vetus Testamentum, Journal for the Study of the Old Testament, Scottish Journal of Theology, Interpretation, Theology Today, Biblische Zeitschrift, Anglican Theological Review, Zeitschrift für die Alttestamentliche Wissenschaft, The Christian Century, The Anchor Bible Dictionary, First Things, and Pro Ecclesia. He is the Editor of Studies in Theological Interpretation, and has served on the editorial boards of Interpretation, Hermeneia, Journal of Theological Interpretation, Zeitschrift für die alttestamentliche Wissenschaft, and Pro Ecclesia.

He is a two-time Alexander von Humboldt research scholar (from 1991 to 1992 at LMU Munich and in 2013 at the University of Göttingen), a Henry Luce III Foundation grant recipient, and a Fellow of the Center of Theological Inquiry in Princeton, New Jersey.

Seitz is an ordained Episcopal priest and has served parishes in Texas, Connecticut, Pennsylvania, Germany, France and Scotland. He served as the president of The Anglican Communion Institute and was canon theologian in the Episcopal Diocese of Dallas until 2015. He and his wife Elizabeth lived in Courances, France from 2015 to 2020, during which time he was Visiting Professor at Centre Sevres in Paris from 2019 to 2021. He runs her French language, culture, and travel business, French Affaires LLC, after her death in 2021 (www.frenchaffaires.com).

== Contribution ==
Seitz has been influenced by his former teacher and then colleague Brevard Childs at Yale University, a key figure advocating for the significance of canon in biblical interpretation, and for the appropriate use of the Old Testament in Christian theology. A recent book discusses the historical legacy of canonical reading, kindred developments at Vatican II, and important convergences in the work of the late French scholar, Paul Beauchamp. In 2021, he was presented with a Festschrift honoring his life and work. He continues to write and has been researching the life of Nicolas Fouquet, the Superintendent of Finances under Louis XIV.

== Authored works ==
- Advent IV: Preaching the Lectionary, Fortress Press, 1988
- Theology in Conflict: Reactions to the Exile in the Book of Jeremiah, Walter de Gruyter, 1989
- Zion's Final Destiny: The Development of the Book of Isaiah, Fortress Press, 1991
- Isaiah 1—39: Interpretation Commentary Series, Westminster John Knox Press, 1993
- Word Without End: The Old Testament as Abiding Theological Witness, Eerdmans Publishers, 1998
- Figured Out: Typology and Providence in Christian Scripture, Westminster John Knox Press, 2001
- Isaiah 40—66: The New Interpreter's Bible, Abingdon Press, 2001
- Seven Lasting Words: Jesus Speaks from the Cross, Westminster John Knox, 2001
- Prophecy and Hermeneutics: Toward a New Introduction to the Prophets, Studies in Theological Interpretation, Baker Academic, 2007
- The Goodly Fellowship of the Prophets: The Achievement of Association in Canon Formation, Studies in Theological Interpretation, Baker Academic, 2009
- The Character of Christian Scripture: The Significance of a Two Testament Bible, Studies in Theological Interpretation, Baker Academic, 2011
- Colossians: Brazos Theological Commentary Series, Brazos Press, 2014
- Joel: The International Theological Commentary, Bloomsbury, 2016
- The Elder Testament: Canon, Theology, Trinity, Baylor University Press, 2018
- Convergences: Canon and Catholicity, Baylor University Press, 2020
- Essays on Prophecy and Canon: The Rise of a New Model of Interpretation, Mohr Siebeck, 2021
- The Heights of the Hills are His Also, Baylor University Press, 2024
- The Predestinate: Ecclesiastes and the Man Who Outshone the Sun King, Baylor University Press, 2025
- Le Grand Voyage: A Life Lived Well in France, Cascade Books, 2026

== Books edited ==
- Reading and Preaching the Book of Isaiah, Fortress Press, 1988
- Theological Exegesis: Essays in Honor of Brevard S. Childs, Eerdmans Publishers, 1998
- Nicene Christianity: The Future for a New Ecumenism, Brazos Press, 2002
- I Am The LORD Your God: Christian Reflections on the Ten Commandments, Eerdmans Publishers, 2005
- Canon and Biblical Interpretation, Paternoster/Zondervan, 2006
- The Bible as Christian Scripture: The Work of Brevard S. Childs, SBL, 2013

== Festschrift ==
- Collett, Don; Elliott, Mark; Gignilliat, Mark; Radner, Ephraim, eds. (2020). The Identity of Israel's God in Christian Scripture: Essays in Honor of Christopher R. Seitz. Resources for Biblical Study. Vol. 96. Atlanta: SBL Press. ISBN 978-0-88414-469-4.
