= Hector Avalos =

American professor on religion (1958–2021)

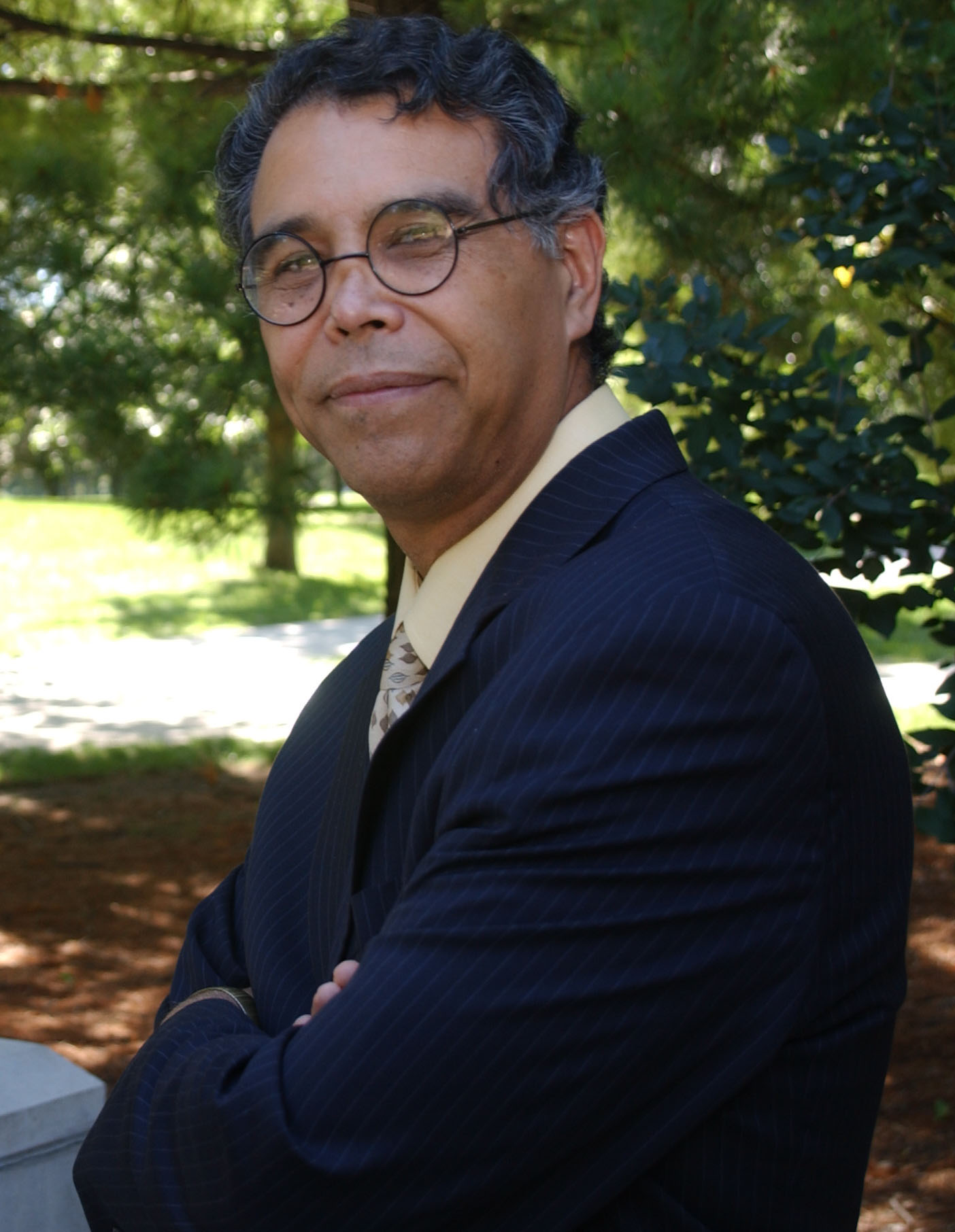
- Born: October 8, 1958; Nogales, Sonora, Mexico
- Died: April 12, 2021 (aged 62); Ames, Iowa, U.S.
- Known for: Biblical studies; Religious Studies

Hector Avalos (October 8, 1958 – April 12, 2021) was a professor of Religious Studies at Iowa State University, a cultural anthropologist, and the author of several books on religion. Avalos was an atheist and advocate of secular humanist ethics.

== Biography ==
Avalos was born in Mexico, in Nogales, just south of the Mexico–United States border. As a child he was a fundamentalist Pentecostal preacher, child evangelist, and faith healer, and became so interested in the Bible that he immersed himself in Biblical Hebrew. In 1982, Avalos obtained a Bachelor of Arts from the University of Arizona, then he attended Harvard Divinity School, where he obtained a Master of Theological Studies degree in 1985. Finally, he obtained a Doctor of Philosophy in Hebrew Bible and Near Eastern Studies from Harvard University in 1991.

Avalos arrived at Iowa State University in the Fall of 1993 after completing a postdoctoral fellowship (1991–93) in the departments of Anthropology and Religious Studies at the University of North Carolina at Chapel Hill. In 1994, Avalos founded and later became the first director of the US Latino/Latina Studies Program at Iowa State University. The program is dedicated to teaching courses about U.S. Latinos, who are defined as people living in the U.S. who trace their roots to the Spanish-speaking countries of Latin America.

In 2005, Avalos and two colleagues published a statement against the teaching of both intelligent design and creationism as legitimate science; it was eventually signed by over 130 faculty members at Iowa State University and became a model for other statements at the University of Northern Iowa and at the University of Iowa.

Avalos died in April 2021 from complications of bladder cancer, with which he was first diagnosed in 2012.

== Publications ==
Avalos' first major work was Illness and Health Care in the Ancient Near East: The Role of the Temple in Greece, Mesopotamia, and Israel (1995), published in the Harvard Semitic Monograph series. The book combined systematically critical biblical studies with medical anthropology to reconstruct the health care systems of Ancient Greece, Mesopotamia, and Israel. In Health Care and the Rise of Christianity (1999) Avalos outlined the thesis that Christianity began, in part, as a health care reform movement that sought to address the problems voiced by patients in the Greco-Roman world.

In August 2018, Avalos received the first Hispanic American Freethinkers Lifetime Achievement Award "honoring a lifetime of scholarship and advocacy promoting freethought”. He was inducted into the 2019 Iowa Latino Hall of Fame for his role in founding the US Latino/a Studies Program at Iowa State University.

=== Books ===
- The Reality of Religious Violence: From Biblical to Modern Times (Sheffield, UK: Sheffield Phoenix Press, 2019)
- The Bad Jesus: The Ethics of New Testament Ethics (Sheffield, UK: Sheffield Phoenix Press, 2015) ISBN 978-1-909697-73-7
- Slavery, Abolitionism, and the Ethics of Biblical Scholarship (Sheffield, UK: Sheffield Phoenix Press, 2011) ISBN 978-1-907534-28-7
- This Abled Body: Rethinking Disabilities in Biblical Studies (co-edited with Sarah Melcher and Jeremy Schipper) (Atlanta: Society of Biblical Literature, 2007) ISBN 1-58983-186-1.
- The End of Biblical Studies (Amherst, NY: Prometheus Books, 2007) ISBN 1-59102-536-2.
- Strangers in Our Own Land: Religion in U.S. Latina/o Literature, (Nashville: Abingdon, 2005) ISBN 0-687-33045-9.
- Fighting Words: The Origins of Religious Violence, (Amherst, NY: Prometheus, 2005) ISBN 1-59102-284-3
- Introduction to the U.S. Latina and Latino Religious Experience, (Editor; Boston: Brill, 2004) ISBN 0-391-04240-8.
- ¿Se puede saber si Dios existe? [Can One Know if God Exists?]. (Amherst, NY: Prometheus Press, 2003) ISBN 1-59102-043-3.
- Health Care and the Rise of Christianity, (Peabody: Mass: Hendrickson Press, 1999) ISBN 1-56563-337-7.
- Illness and Health Care in the Ancient Near East: The Role of the Temple in Greece, Mesopotamia, and Israel (Harvard Semitic Monographs 54: Atlanta: Scholars Press, 1995) ISBN 0-7885-0098-8.
- A chapter called, "Why Biblical studies must end", p107 in The End of Christianity edited by John W. Loftus, (Amherst, NY: Prometheus Books, 2011) ISBN 978-1-61614-413-5.
