= Margaret Barker (theologian) =

British biblical scholar

Margaret Barker (born 1944) She studied theology at the University of Cambridge, after which she has devoted her life to research in ancient Christianity. She has developed an approach to biblical studies known as Temple Theology.

She was president of the Society for Old Testament Study in 1998, and in July 2008 she was awarded the Lambeth degree of Doctor of Divinity by the Archbishop of Canterbury.

== Temple Theology ==
Temple Theology is an approach to biblical studies developed by Margaret Barker in her books starting from The Great High Priest (2003) and Temple Theology (2004). This approach identifies some elements of the theology and worship of Solomon's Temple that endured beyond Josiah's reform and survived in both early Christian theology and liturgy and in gnosticism. According to this view Temple Theology has been influential in moulding the roots of Christianity as well as, or even more than, Hellenistic or synagogue culture.

According to Barker, the main ideas of Temple Theology are the following:

- understanding the First Temple as the figure of the whole universe: the inner court (the sea) to be the figure of the pagans, the Holy (the earth) to be the figure of the Jewish people and the Holy of Holies (the heaven) to be the figure of the Garden of Eden;
- entering the Holy of the Holies is a mystical experience that transforms man into an angel (theosis), thus entering the Garden of Eden and giving knowledge to understand creation. This idea is related to the Resurrection;
- the main aim of the liturgy, and in particular of the Day of Atonement, was to maintain the Creation.
- The Lord (Yahweh), the God of Israel, was the Son of God Most High. Jesus, from the very beginning, was recognised as the Lord in this sense.
- The early Christian liturgy incorporated many elements of the First Temple Liturgy: the liturgy of the bread of the Eucharist traces its roots in the Saturday offering of the bread (Leviticus 24:5–9) and the liturgy of the wine in the Day of Atonement.

Margaret Barker works from all the available sources (the Hebrew Bible, the Septuagint, the Dead Sea Scrolls, the New Testament, the Jewish and Christian Apocrypha and Pseudepigrapha, Gnostic texts, and other early writings and artwork). According to her, Sola Scriptura – the doctrine that the Bible is the supreme authority in all matters of doctrine and practice – has hindered rather than helped the understanding of Christianity.

== Reception ==
Margaret Barker's work has been received positively within the Latter-day Saint tradition. However, it has been regarded as fanciful and unpersuasive to some New Testament scholars. Specifically, some scholars believe Barker engages in parallelomania. Barker's later work has been critiqued for primarily citing her own work, and failing to substantially engage with the broader scholarly literature covering the topics on which she writes. However the same critic also points to original elements of her work which deserve further study and appreciation. Writes Peter Schäfer of Princeton: "For a Judaism scholar [Schäfer] focused on religious history, [Barker's] books are particularly hard to digest. They contain numerous surprising as well as brilliant insights, but all in all create a new syncretistic religion that avoids any and all chronological, geographic, and literary differentiations." Notable supporters of Barker's work include Robert M. Price.

== Publications ==
- The Older Testament: The Survival of Themes from the Ancient Royal Cult in Sectarian Judaism and Early Christianity. London: SPCK, 1987. New edition Sheffield Phoenix Press, 2005 (ISBN 190504819X)
- The Lost Prophet: The Book of Enoch and Its Influence on Christianity. London: SPCK, 1988. New edition Sheffield Phoenix Press, 2005 (ISBN 1905048181)
- The Gate of Heaven: The History and Symbolism of the Temple in Jerusalem. London: SPCK, 1991. New edition Sheffield Phoenix Press, 2008 (ISBN 1906055424)
- The Great Angel: A Study of Israel's Second God. London: SPCK; Louisville, KY: Westminster/John Knox Press, 1992 (ISBN 0281045925)
- On Earth as It Is in Heaven: Temple Symbolism in the New Testament. London: T&T Clark, 1995. New edition Sheffield Phoenix Press, 2009 (ISBN 1906055750)
- The Risen Lord: The Jesus of History as the Christ of Faith. Edinburgh: T&T Clark, 1996 (ISBN 0567085376)
- The Revelation of Jesus Christ. Edinburgh: T&T Clark, 2000 (ISBN 0567087166)
- The Great High Priest: The Temple Roots of Christian Liturgy. London & New York: T&T Clark/Continuum, 2003 (ISBN 0567089428)
- Temple Theology: An Introduction. London: SPCK, 2004 (ISBN 028105634X)
- An Extraordinary Gathering of Angels. London: M Q Publications Ltd, 2004 (ISBN 1840726806)
- The Hidden Tradition of the Kingdom of God. London: SPCK, 2007 (ISBN 0281058466)
- Temple Themes in Christian Worship. London: T&T Clark, 2007 (ISBN 0567032760)
- Christmas: The Original Story. London: SPCK, 2008 (ISBN 0281060509)
- Creation: a Biblical Vision for the Environment. London: T&T Clark, 2010 (ISBN 0567015475)
- Temple Mysticism: An Introduction. London: SPCK, 2011 (ISBN 0281064830)
- The Mother of the Lord: The Lady in the Temple (Volume 1). London: Bloomsbury T&T Clark, 2012 (ISBN 0567528154)
- King of the Jews: Temple Theology in John's Gospel. London: SPCK, 2014 (ISBN 0281069670)
