= Sheffield school =

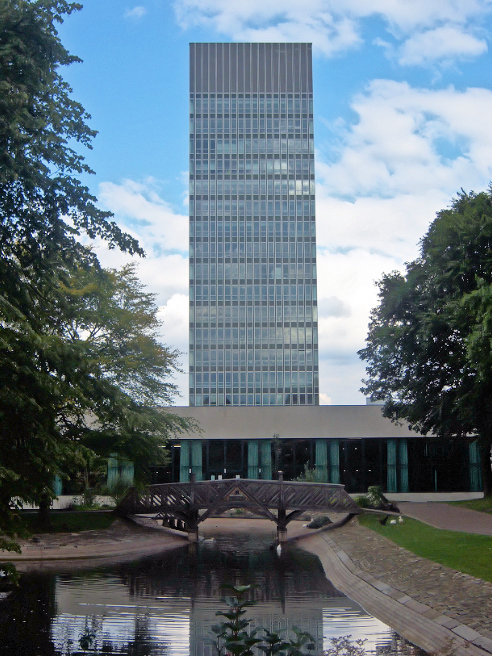
The Arts Tower, which housed the University of Sheffield's Biblical Studies department.

The Sheffield school is an approach in biblical studies that engages in literary readings of the final form of the biblical text.

== History ==
Tremper Longman coined the term "Sheffield school" in 1987, referencing the University of Sheffield, where David J. A. Clines (associated with the University of Sheffield from 1964) and David M. Gunn pioneered the approach.

The approach is also associated with the Journal for the Study of the Old Testament. The Sheffield school is known for its use of formalism.

== See also ==
- Canonical criticism
