= Yisroel Pinchos Bodner =

American rabbi

Rabbi Yisroel Pinchos Bodner is the author of several books on the subject of Jewish Law all published by Feldheim Publishers Inc. He has received approbation for his books from various rabbis, including Rabbi Rav Moshe Feinstein, Rabbi Shlomo Zalman Auerbach, and Rabbi Chaim Pinchos Scheinberg. He resides in Lakewood Township, New Jersey.

== Selected works ==
- Halachos of Brochos
- Halachos of K'Zayis
- Halachos of Muktza
- Halachos of Other People's Money
- Halachos of Refuah on Shabbos
