= Keith Bodner =

Canadian scholar of the Old Testament

Keith Bodner (born 1967) is a Canadian scholar of the Old Testament. He teaches at Crandall University in Moncton, New Brunswick and Briercrest College and Seminary in Caronport, Saskatchewan.

== Early life ==
Raised in British Columbia, Keith Bodner received his higher education in Canada and the United Kingdom. He received a BA in politics and English from the University of Manitoba, an MA in Theological Studies from Regent College, a PhD in the Hebrew Bible and Literary Criticism from the University of Aberdeen in Scotland, and a PhD in Intertextuality and Renaissance Drama from the University of Manchester in England.

== Career ==
Bodner began teaching at the University of Aberdeen, and then began full-time teaching as an assistant professor, later an associate professor, at Tyndale University College and Seminary in Toronto. He left to take a position as professor of religious studies at Atlantic Baptist University, later Crandall University, where he was given the Stuart E. Murray Chair of Biblical Studies and awarded the Stephen and Ella Steeves Excellence Awards in Teaching (2011) and Research (2008 and again in 2017).

Bodner lectured at Regent College (1999 and 2008), Briercrest Seminary (2000 and 2017–18), and McMaster Divinity College (2002–10) in Canada, and at Wuhan University and Fudan University in China (2012).

Bodner has served on PhD committees at Claremont Graduate University, the University of Sydney, and the University of Toronto. He chaired a section of the Society of Biblical Literature ("Bakhtin and the Biblical Imagination," 2006-11), sits on the editorial board of the Journal for the Study of the Old Testament, and has served the Canadian Society of Biblical Studies as executive secretary since 2013.

Bodner is the author of several dozen refereed journal articles and book chapters. He has authored a dozen monographs on various texts of the Old Testament, and has received the Canadian Society of Biblical Studies R. B. Y. Scott Book Award in 2009 and 2013.

== Books ==
- Keith Bodner (2003). National Insecurity: A Primer on the First Book of Samuel. Toronto: Clements Publishing. ISBN 978-1894667296.
- Keith Bodner (2004). Power Play: A Primer on the Second Book of Samuel. Toronto: Clements Publishing. ISBN 9781894667371.
- Keith Bodner (2005). David Observed: A King in the Eyes of His Court. Sheffield, UK: Sheffield Phoenix. ISBN 9781905048236.
- Keith Bodner (2008). 1 Samuel: A Narrative Commentary. Sheffield, UK: Sheffield Phoenix. ISBN 9781906055882.
- Keith Bodner (2012). Jeroboam’s Royal Drama. Oxford: Oxford University Press. ISBN 978-0199601882.
- Keith Bodner (2013). The Artistic Dimension: Literary Explorations of the Hebrew Bible. London: T. & T. Clark. ISBN 978-0567451965.
- Keith Bodner (2013). Elisha’s Profile in the Book of Kings: The Double Agent. Oxford: Oxford University Press. ISBN 978-0199681174.
- Keith Bodner (2013). The Rebellion of Absalom. New York: Routledge. ISBN 978-0415719483.
- Keith Bodner (2015). After the Invasion: A Reading of Jeremiah 40-44. Oxford: Oxford University Press. ISBN 978-0198743002.
- Keith Bodner (2016). An Ark on the Nile: The Beginning of the Book of Exodus. Oxford: Oxford University Press. ISBN 978-0198784074.
- Keith Bodner (2019). The Theology of the Book of Kings. Cambridge: Cambridge University Press. ISBN 978-0198743002.
