= Danna Nolan Fewell =

Danna Nolan Fewell is an Old Testament scholar. She is John Fletcher Hurst Professor of Hebrew Bible at Drew University Theological School.

Fewell studied at Candler School of Theology, Emory University and previously taught at the Perkins School of Theology, Southern Methodist University. Fewell has enjoyed a successful association with David M. Gunn, with whom she has co-authored several articles and three books: Compromising Redemption: Relating Characters in the Book of Ruth; Gender, Power, and Promise: The Subject of the Bible's First Story; and Narrative in the Hebrew Bible. Fewell and Gunn represent a postmodern literary approach to biblical literature. Her other works include Circle of Sovereignty: Plotting Politics in the Book of Daniel (1991), The Children of Israel: Reading the Bible for the Sake of Our Children (2003), and Icon of Loss: The Haunting Child of Samuel Bak (2009). She is the editor of Reading Between Texts: Intertextuality and the Hebrew Bible (1992) and the co-editor of Bible and Ethics of Reading (1997) and Representing the Irreparable: The Shoah, the Bible, and the Art of Samuel Bak (2008). Her most recent major publication is The Oxford Handbook of Biblical Narrative (2016) a volume of fifty-one essays by some of the world’s most noted and most recent authorities on various aspects of biblical narrative. Fewell has been one of the first biblical scholars to focus on how children are represented in the Bible.
