= Journal for the Study of the Old Testament =

- Discipline: Biblical studies
- Language: English
- Edited by: David Shepherd, Lena-Sofia Tiemeyer

Publication details
- History: 1976-present
- Publisher: SAGE Publications
- Frequency: 5/year

Standard abbreviations
- ISO 4: J. Study Old Testam.

Indexing
- ISSN: 0309-0892
- LCCN: 80641375
- OCLC no.: 216746574

Links
- Journal homepage; Online access; Online archive

The Journal for the Study of the Old Testament (JSOT) is a peer-reviewed academic journal covering the field of Biblical studies. The editors-in-chief are David Shepherd (Trinity College Dublin) and Lena-Sofia Tiemeyer (Örebro School of Theology). It was established in 1976 and is published by SAGE Publications.

The journal is associated with the Sheffield school approach, which engages in literary readings of the final form of the biblical text.

== Abstracting and indexing ==
The journal is abstracted and indexed in:

- Academics Premier
- ATLA Religion Database
- Index theologicus
- New Testament Abstracts
- Religion & Philosophy Collection
