= Biblical Interpretation (journal) =

- Discipline: Biblical hermeneutics
- Language: English
- Edited by: Christine Helmer

Publication details
- History: 1993-present
- Publisher: Brill

Standard abbreviations
- ISO 4: Biblic. Interpret.

Indexing
- ISSN: 0927-2569

Links
- Journal homepage

Biblical Interpretation: A Journal of Contemporary Approaches is a peer-reviewed academic journal of biblical studies published in five issues per year by Brill Publishers. The editor-in-chief is Colleen Conway.
