= Canonical criticism =

Biblical interpretation that focuses on the text of the biblical canon itself

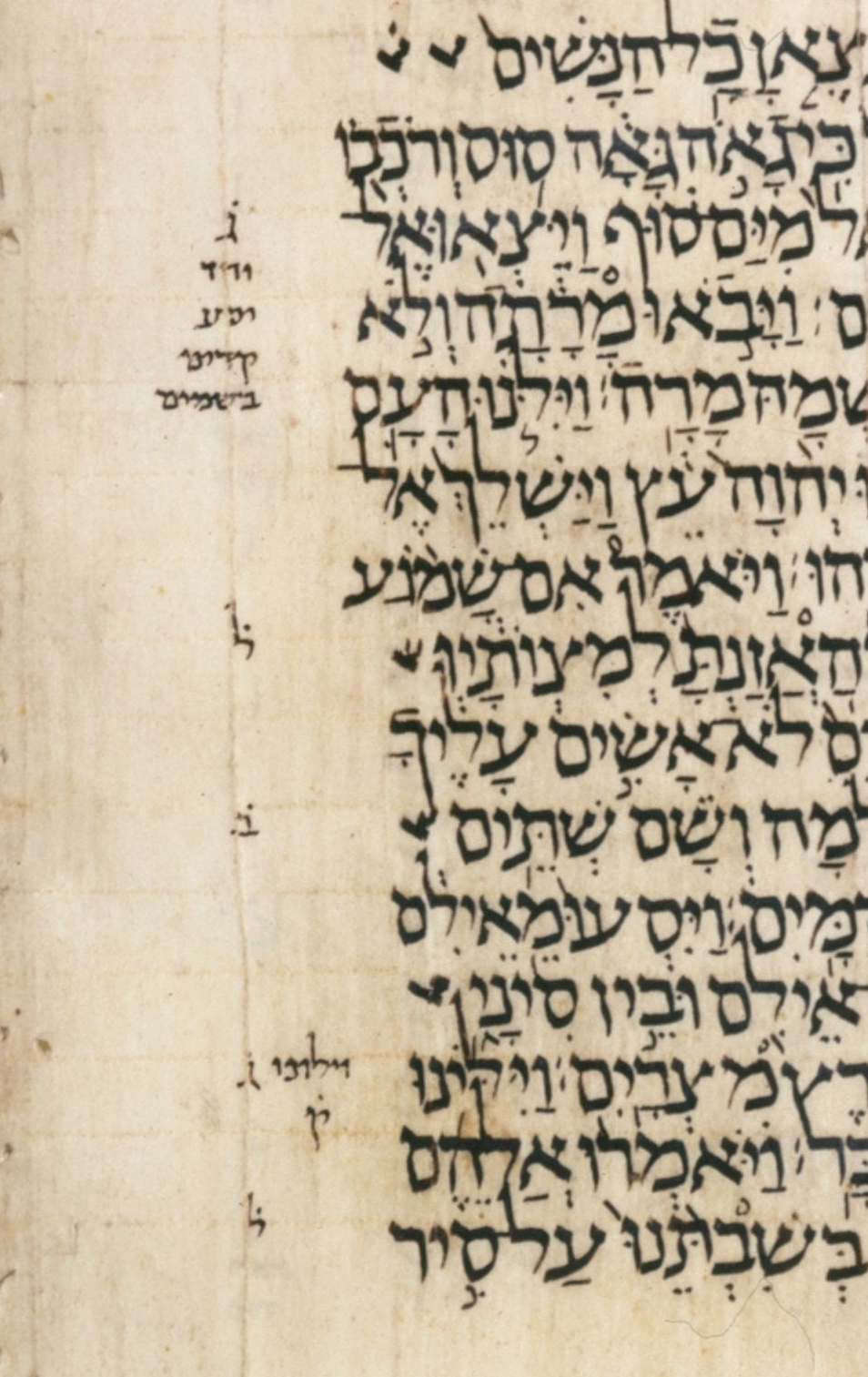
A portion of the Leningrad Codex. Although the Hebrew Bible is the result of a developmental process, canonical criticism focuses on the final form of the text.

Canonical criticism, sometimes called canon criticism or the canonical approach, is a way of interpreting the Bible that focuses on the text of the biblical canon itself as a finished product.

Brevard Childs (1923–2007) popularised this approach, though he personally rejected the term. Whereas other types of biblical criticism focus on the origins, structure and history of texts, canonical criticism looks at the meaning which the overall text, in its final form, has for the community which uses it.

== Description ==
Canonical criticism involves "paying attention to the present form of the text in determining its meaning for the believing community." According to opponent James Barr, it involves concentrating authority "in the canonical text, and not in the people or events out of which that text came."

Childs says that the canon "not only serves to establish the outer boundaries of authoritative Scripture," but "forms a prism through which light from the different aspects of the Christian life is refracted." He also notes that "the tradents of the tradition have sought to hide their own footprints in order to focus attention on the canonical text itself and not on the process." However, Childs refuses to speak of canonical criticism as if it were on a level with form criticism or redaction criticism. According to Childs, it represents an entirely new departure, replacing the entire historical-critical method.

John H. Sailhamer views the "canonical approach" as including the "canon criticism" of Childs, as well as composition criticism, redaction criticism, and text linguistics.

== Origins ==
Canonical criticism is a relatively new approach to biblical studies. As recently as 1983, James Barr could state that canon had no hermeneutical significance for biblical interpretation. Childs set out his canonical approach in his Biblical Theology in Crisis (1970) and applied it in Introduction to the Old Testament as Scripture (1979).

The phrase "canonical criticism" was first used by James A. Sanders in 1972. Childs repudiates the term because

It implies that the concern with canon is viewed as another historical-critical technique which can take its place alongside of source criticism, form criticism, rhetorical criticism, and the like. I do not envision the approach to canon in this light. Rather, the issue at stake in canon turns on establishing a stance from which the Bible is to be read as Sacred Scripture.

Canonical criticism arose as a reaction to other forms of biblical criticism. John Barton argues that Child's primary thesis is that historical-critical methods are "unsatisfactory theologically."

According to Barton, Childs' approach is "genuinely new," in that it is an "attempt to heal the breach between biblical criticism and theology," and in that it belongs more to the realm of literary criticism than that of 'historical' study of texts.

Sanders argues that canonical criticism is biblical criticism's "self-critical stance":

It is not only a logical evolution of earlier stages in the growth of criticism but it also reflects back on all the disciplines of biblical criticism and informs them all to some extent."

He also suggests that it places the Bible "back where it belongs, in the believing communities of today":

Canonical criticism might be seen in metaphor as the beadle (bedelos) who now carries the critically studied Bible in procession back to the church lectern from the scholar's study.

Barton has noted parallels between canonical criticism and the New Criticism of T. S. Eliot and others. Both schools of thought affirm that "a literary text is an artefact," that "intentionalism is a fallacy," and that "the meaning of a text is a function of its place in the literary canon."

== Criticism ==
The canonical approach has been criticised by scholars from both liberal and evangelical perspectives.

=== As excessively conservative ===
Dale Brueggemann notes that Barr accuses Childs of "aiding and abetting" fundamentalists. Although Childs' approach is "post-critical" rather than pre-critical, Barr argues that the vision of a post-critical era "is the conservative dream."

=== As inadequately conservative ===
Conservative scholars, on the other hand, object to the way canonical criticism bypasses "vexed questions relating to the historical validation of revelation." Oswalt suggests that canonical critics blithely "separate fact and meaning" when they suggest that we are called to submit to the inspired truth of the text, despite the community's inability to admit where they really got it.

=== Failure to achieve its own goals ===
Barton writes that

Whatever else Childs is doing, he is not taking us 'back to the canon', for no one has ever been aware of the canon in this way before. It is only after we have seen how varied and inconsistent the Old Testament really is that we can begin to ask whether it can nonetheless be read as forming a unity.

Barton also suggests that there is tension between "the text itself" and "the text as part of the canon". That is, the canonical approach stresses both the text in its final form as we have it, as well as the idea that "the words which compose the text draw their meaning from the context and setting in which they are meant to be read." Barton argues that "the canonical approach actually undermines the concern for the finished text as an end in itself, and brings us, once again, nearer to traditional historical criticism."

== Applications ==
Childs applies his canonical approach to prophetic literature, and argues that in Amos, "an original prophetic message was expanded by being placed in a larger theological context," while in Nahum and Habakkuk, the oracles are assigned a new role through the introduction of hymnic material, and they "now function as a dramatic illustration of the eschatological triumph of God."

Jon Isaak applies the canonical approach to 1 Corinthians 14 and the issue of women being silent in the church. Isaak argues that

In the canonical approach, theological concerns take precedent over historical interests. No attempt is made to reconstruct a historical portrait of Paul in order to prove some point or to disprove another. There is no psychologizing based on what Paul could or could not have said.

Gerald H. Wilson adopted a canonical approach in his studies of Psalter, and concluded that the book had a purposeful unity and "had been redacted to represent a developing sequence of ideals." Yee Von Koh suggests that Wilson was "the first to apply canonical criticism to the study of the Psalter in the clearest and most comprehensive way."

The canonical approach has also been applied to passages such as Psalm 137 and Ezekiel 20.

== See also ==
- Sheffield school
- Postliberal theology

== Sources ==
- Barton, John (1984). Reading the Old Testament: Method in Biblical Study. Westminster John Knox Press. ISBN 978-0-664-24555-9.
- Sanders, James A. (1984). Canon and Community: A Guide to Canonical Criticism. Fortress Press. ISBN 978-0-8006-0468-4.
