= Brevard Childs =

Old Testament scholar and professor

- Born: 2 September 1923; Columbia, South Carolina, US
- Died: June 23, 2007; New Haven, Connecticut, US
- Education: University of Michigan
- Occupation: Sterling Professor of Old Testament at Yale University
- Notable work: Introduction to the Old Testament as Scripture (1979); The New Testament as Canon: An Introduction (1984); Biblical Theology of the Old and New Testaments: Theological Reflection on the Christian Bible (1992)
- Spouse: Ann Childs
- Theological work
- Era: Late 20th and early 21st century
- Language: English
- Main interests: Biblical theology (particularly Old Testament theology)
- Notable ideas: Canonical approach

Brevard Springs Childs (September 2, 1923 – June 23, 2007) was an American Old Testament scholar and Professor of Old Testament at Yale University from 1958 until 1999 (and Sterling Professor after 1992), who is considered one of the most influential biblical scholars of the 20th century.

== Thought ==
Childs is particularly noted for pioneering the canonical approach, a way of interpreting the Bible that focuses on the text of the biblical canon itself as a finished product. In fact, Childs disliked the term, believing his work to represent an entirely new departure, replacing the entire historical-critical method. Childs set out his canonical approach in his Biblical Theology in Crisis (1970) and applied it in Introduction to the Old Testament as Scripture (1979). This latter book has been described as "one of the most discussed books of the 1980s".

Childs' influences included Karl Barth and Hermann Gunkel. Charles Scalise in his book From Scripture to Theology states that Child's canonical hermeneutics uses three of Barth's hermeneutical tools which include "(1) Barth's focus on interpreting the (Scriptural) text as it stands, (2) the 'postcritical' perspective of Barth's hermeneutics and (3) Barth's emphasis on the theological nature of canon in interpreting Scripture".

Christopher Seitz argues that

Professor Childs single-handedly effected major and sustained changes in the conceptual framework of modern biblical studies through appeal to the canonical presentation of biblical books and the theological implications of attending to their final form.

Seitz has also noted that "there is a small cottage industry in evaluating the contribution of Brevard Childs." For example, John Barton writes about Childs' response to those who claimed that historical criticism "deliberately took away the Bible's religious claims in order to subject it to analysis". In Childs' canonical approach, writes Barton, "the interpreter of the Bible should not confront the biblical text as if it were a newly discovered document." To the contrary, as Barton reads Childs, "a properly theological reading of the Bible, by contrast, would treat it just as it stands as a vehicle of a living faith."

== Education ==
Childs' formal education was interrupted during 1943-45 while he was serving in the United States Army during World War II. After being discharged, he continued his academic work at the University of Michigan.

- B.A., M.A. - University of Michigan (1947)
- B.D. - Princeton Theological Seminary (1950)
- Th.D. - University of Basel (1955)

In addition to his earned degrees, Childs was awarded an honorary Doctorate of Theology by the University of Aberdeen in 1981 and by the University of Glasgow in 1992.

== Life ==
There is no one hermeneutical key for unlocking the biblical message, but the canon provides the arena in which the struggle for understanding takes place.

Most of Childs' professional life was spent in the United States, Germany and the United Kingdom. From 1958-1999, he was Professor of Old Testament at Yale University. In 2007, shortly after returning from his spring residence in the United Kingdom, Childs suffered a severe fall at his home in Connecticut from which he did not recover. He had continued writing and publishing until the end.

Childs was survived by his wife, Ann, and their children, Cathy and John.

Ellen Davis of Duke Divinity School studied under Childs and notes:

His scholarship was very fully integrated into his character, it would be very difficult to separate those two. He was a Christian. His work was a form of discipleship.

In 1990, a Festschrift was published in his honor. Canon, Theology, and Old Testament Interpretation: Essays in Honor of Brevard S. Childs included contributions from James Barr, John Van Seters, Ronald E. Clements, and James Luther Mays.

== Works ==
In addition to the following books, during the 1955–2006 period, Childs wrote some eighty articles and reviews.

=== Books ===
- Childs, Brevard S. (1960). Myth and Reality in the Old Testament. Studies in Biblical Theology. Vol. 27. Naperville, IL: A. R. Allenson. OCLC 356551.
- ——— (1962). Memory and Tradition in Israel. Studies in Biblical Theology. Vol. 37. Naperville, IL: A. R. Allenson. OCLC 356542.
- ——— (1967). Isaiah and the Assyrian Crisis. Studies in Biblical Theology - 2nd series. Vol. 3. London: SCM Press. OCLC 356534.
- ——— (1970). Biblical Theology in Crisis. Philadelphia, PA: The Westminster Press. ISBN 978-0-6642-0882-0. OCLC 66673.
- ——— (1974). The Book of Exodus: A Critical, Theological Commentary. Old Testament Library. Philadelphia, PA: The Westminster Press. ISBN 978-0-6642-0985-8. OCLC 800708.
- ——— (1977). Old Testament Books for Pastor and Teacher. Philadelphia, PA: The Westminster Press. ISBN 978-0-6642-4120-9. OCLC 2694982.
- ——— (1979). Introduction to the Old Testament as Scripture. Philadelphia, PA: Fortress Press. ISBN 978-0-800-60532-2. OCLC 4495768.
- ——— (1984). The New Testament as Canon: An Introduction. Philadelphia, PA: Fortress Press. ISBN 978-0-800-60739-5. OCLC 11234811.
- ——— (1985). Old Testament Theology in a Canonical Context. Philadelphia, PA: Fortress Press. ISBN 978-0-800-60772-2. OCLC 12666442.
- ——— (1992). Biblical Theology of the Old and New Testaments: Theological Reflection on the Christian Bible. Minneapolis, MN: Fortress Press. ISBN 978-0-800-62675-4. OCLC 26673846.
- ——— (2001). Isaiah: A Commentary. Old Testament Library. Louisville, KY: Westminster, John Knox Press. ISBN 978-0-6642-2143-0. OCLC 43648635.
- ——— (2002). Biblical Theology: A Proposal. Facets (Fortress Press. Minneapolis, MN: Fortress Press. ISBN 978-0-800-63481-0. OCLC 49346420.
- ——— (2004). The Struggle to Understand Isaiah as Christian Scripture. Grand Rapids, MI: Eerdmans. ISBN 978-0-802-82761-6. OCLC 55109109.
- ——— (2008). The Church's Guide for Reading Paul: The Canonical Shaping of the Pauline Corpus. Grand Rapids, MI: Eerdmans. ISBN 9780802862785. OCLC 213452265.

== See also ==
- Theology of crisis
