= Tell Abu al-Kharaz =

Archeological site in Jordan

Tell Abu Al-Kharaz
- تل أبو الخرز (Arabic)
- Location within Jordan
- 32.3993°N 35.5948°E
- Type: Settlement
- Periods: Early Bronze Age to Iron Age
- Associated with: Canaanites, Israelites
- Location: Irbid Governorate, Jordan

Site notes
- Excavation dates: 1989-2001
- Archaeologists: Swedish Jordan Expedition
- Condition: In ruins
- Public access: Yes

Tell Abu al-Kharaz (Arabic: تل أبو الخرز, lit. 'Mound of the Father of Beads') is an archeological tell in the Irbid Governorate of modern-day Jordan. Tell Abu al-Kharaz was the site of a fortified town during the Bronze and Iron Ages; it is located in the Jordan Valley, 4 kilometers east of the Jordan River.

== Location ==
Tell Abu al-Kharaz is situated on a strategic point, approximately one kilometer north to where the perennial stream of Wadi al-Yabis enters the Jordan Valley. It lies in a region known in biblical times as Gilead.

The site is located 35 km from the Sea of Galilee, and 80 km from the Mediterranean Sea; it is 4 km east of the Jordan River, and 6 km south-southwest of Pella. It was at the crossroads of ancient trade routes that linked Megiddo and Beit Shean to the Mediterranean.

The tell is about 60 meters high (116 meters below sea level) and covers an area of 300 x 400 meters. It was excavated between 1989 and 2001 by the Swedish Jordan Expedition under the direction of Peter M. Fischer.

== History ==
The settlement mound was inhabited from the Chalcolithic until the Islamic period. A number of fortified towns from the Early Bronze Age (EBA I, II), the end of the Middle Bronze Age, Late Bronze Age (I, II), and Iron Age (I, II) were excavated at the site. The site is believed to have been abandoned for over a thousand years – between the Early Bronze Age (EBA II) and the late Middle Bronze Age (from approximately 2900 to 1650 BCE).

Archaeological evidence demonstrates that the oldest town from the Early Bronze Age around 3000 BCE was the largest.

=== Early Bronze Age ===
Imported pottery was found at the Phase 1 of the mound, which is dated to the Early Bronze Age. These items have been identified as cylindrical jars, and mace heads coming from Predynastic Egypt (Naqada IIIB). Up to now, these finds represent the furthest northern spread of such Egyptian imports of this early period.

=== Middle Bronze Age ===
==== Middle Bronze IIC - Hyksos period ====
Since the Middle Bronze Age (MB IIC, c. 1600 BCE), local Jordan valley type pottery, and Cypriot-type pottery were predominant in Tell Abu al-Kharaz. Egyptian imports were almost completely missing. Cypriot imports were also found at the site (White Slip I and White Slip II wares).

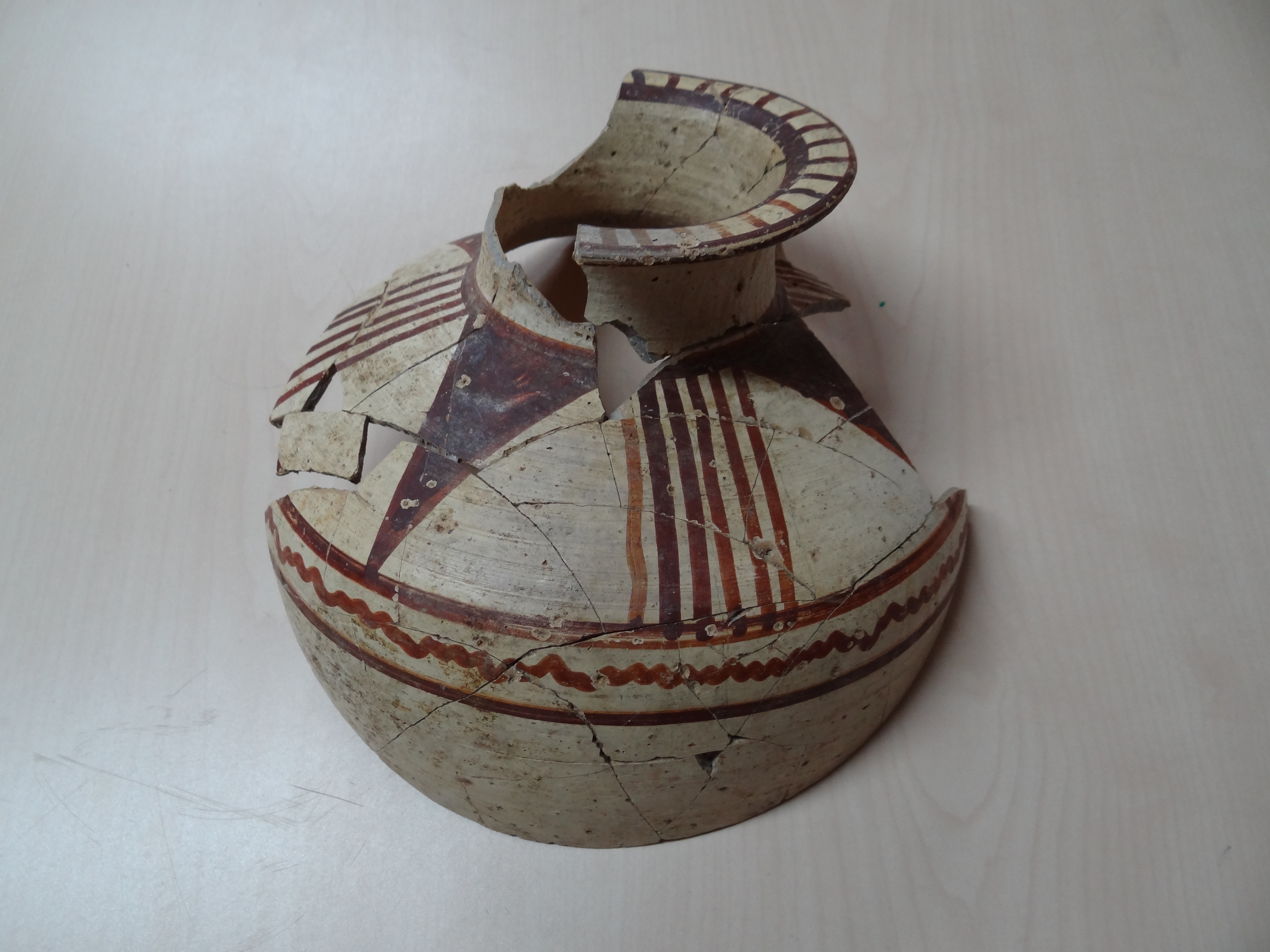
This type of Chocolate-on-white ware is commonly found at the site

A large amount of Chocolate-on-white ware was found at Tell Abu al-Kharaz. This type of pottery was most likely produced locally on-site, but it is also present at several other sites in the Jordan Valley and nearby areas. There is no confirmed find of such pottery on Cyprus or in the Aegean.

=== Iron Age ===
A large agricultural compound dating from Iron Age I was unearthed in Tell Abu al-Kharaz. Botanical remains discovered at the compound include pomegranates, olives, figs, grapes, flax and emmer among others. Remains from Iron Age II include four-room houses, an iron workshop, bone handles decorated with sphinxes, and an ostracon bearing inscription in Hebrew or related Transjordanian dialects.

The Iron Age settlement was destroyed around 700 BCE, probably by the Neo-Assyrian Empire.

== Biblical identification ==
Nelson Glueck, Gershon Galil and other biblical scholars have proposed to identify Tell Abu al-Kharaz with the biblical town of Jabesh-Gilead, although this identification is not widely accepted. Many scholars have preferred to identify Jabesh with Tell el-Maqlub, located further to the east on Wadi al-Yabis.

Noth and Ottosson identified Tell Abu al-Kharaz with Abel-meholah.

== Notes ==
This article is based on the article in German Wikipedia.

== Bibliography ==
- Peter M. Fischer: Tell Abu al-Kharaz in the Jordan Valley. Verlag der Österreichischen Akademie der Wissenschaften, Wien 2006 ff.
1. The Early Bronze Age. 2008, ISBN 978-3-7001-3880-8.
2. The Middle and Late Bronze Ages. 2006, ISBN 978-3-7001-3868-6.
- Peter M. Fischer: The Chronology of the Jordan Valley during the Middle and Late Bronze Ages. Pella, Tell Abu al-Kharaz and Tell Deir 'Alla. Wien 2007, ISBN 978-3-7001-3816-7.
- Peter M. Fischer: Jordan Valley and Cyprus In: Paul Åström und Dietrich Sürenhagen (Hrsg.): Periplus. Festschrift für Hans-Günter Buchholz zu seinem achtzigsten Geburtstag am 24. Dezember 1999. Gothenburg 2000, ISBN 91-7081-101-6, 51 ff.
