= Khirbet el-Mastarah =

Archaeological site in the West Bank

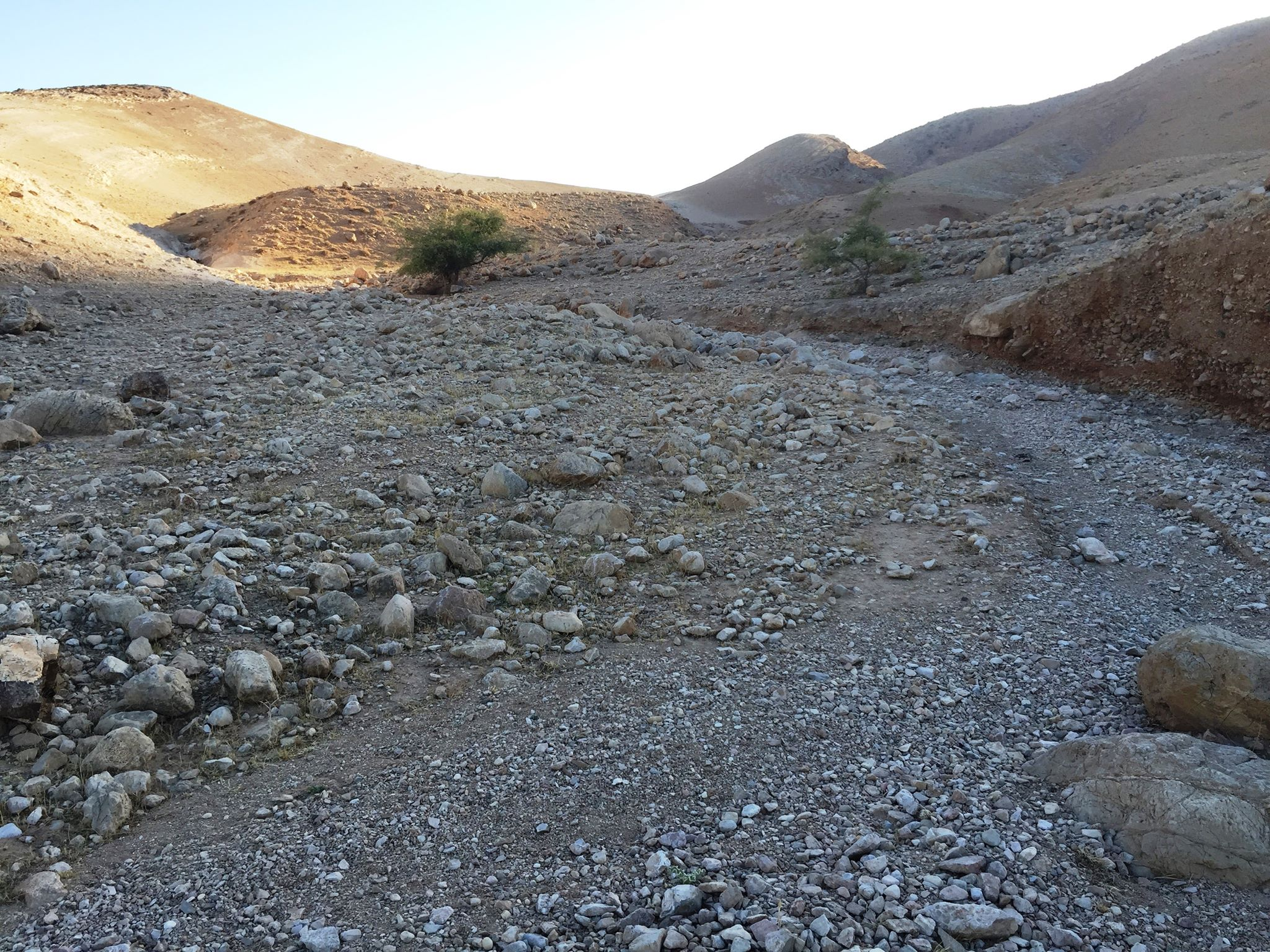
- The Iron I site of Khirbet el-Mastarah

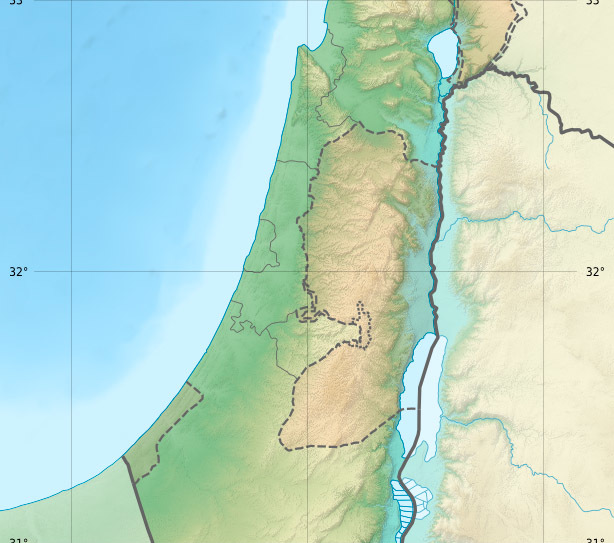
- Location within West Bank
- 31.961393°N 35.408925°E
- Type: Complex oval compound
- Periods: Iron Age I and II
- Cultures: Israelite
- Region: West Bank

History
- Built: Iron Age I

Site notes
- Elevation: −3–7 m (−9.8–23.0 ft)
- Length: 70–100 m (230–330 ft)
- Area: 2.5 acres (1.0 ha)
- Excavation dates: 5-29 June 2017
- Archaeologists: Adam Zertal, David Ben-Shlomo, Ralph K. Hawkins
- Discovered: April 2004
- Condition: Ruins
- Website: www.jvep.org/khirbetel-mastarah

Khirbet el-Mastarah is an archaeological site that includes the largest of the complex oval compound type habitation sites located in the middle Jordan Valley in the West Bank.

== Location ==
Khirbet el-Masratah is located 8 km (5.0 mi) north of Jericho and 2 km (1.2 mi) west of Ain Aujah in Wadi Auja on a small hill hidden by three larger hills. These surrounding hills cause the 1.0-hectare (2.5-acre) site to be hidden from view.

== Excavation history ==
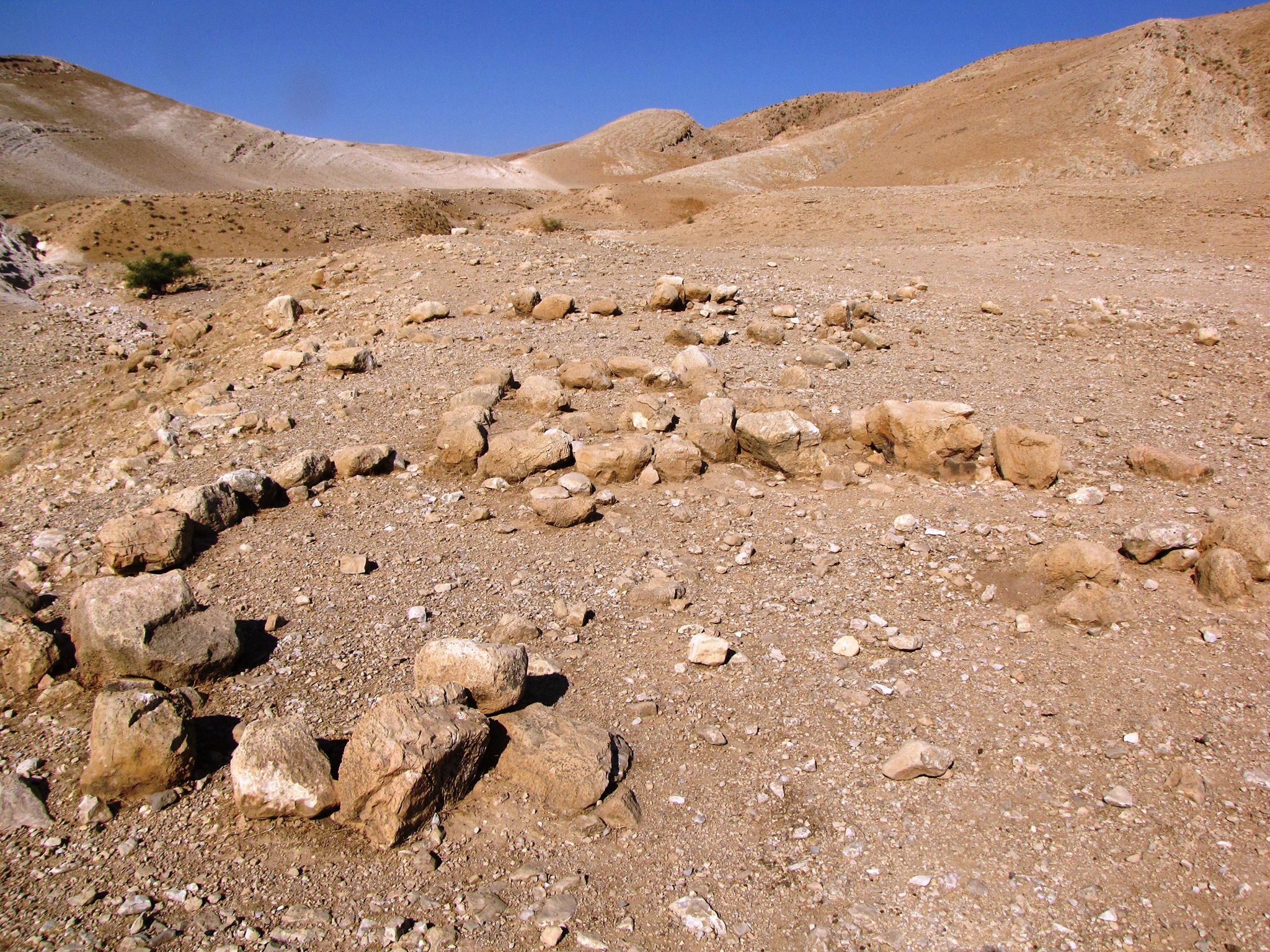
Oval compound at Khirbet el-Mastarah

The site was discovered and surveyed in April 2004 by Adam Zertal during the course of the Manasseh Hill Country Survey.

Under international law an occupying power is not permitted to carry out archaeological excavations except to preserve or rescue a site. An excavation directed by David Ben-Shlomo of Ariel University in the occupied West Bank and Ralph K. Hawkins of Averett University in the United States took place in June 2017. During the excavation a number of large and small rounded and oval enclosures of single-course limestone rubble walls were discovered, all of them almost entirely empty of finds.

== Significance ==
The site's hidden location most probably indicates the presence of a new population migrating to the central hill country from the east during Iron I, avoiding contact with the native population. On this basis the excavation directors believe the site is possibly an early Israelite site, constructed during the early stages of the Israelite Settlement.

== Bibliography ==
- Ben-Shlomo, David; Hawkins, Ralph K. (2017). "Excavations at Khirbet el Mastarah, the Jordan Valley, 2017". Judea and Samaria Research Studies. 26 (2). Ariel University Publishing.
- Ben-Shlomo, David; Hawkins (July–August 2018). "Khirbet el-Mastarah: An Early Israelite Settlement?". Biblical Archaeology Review. 9 (5). Archived from the original on 15 April 2020.
- Stahl, Ziv (2017), Appropriating the Past Israel's Archaeological Practices in the West Bank (PDF), Emek Shaveh and Yesh Din
- Zertal, Adam (2012). The Manasseh Hill Country Survey, Vol. V: The Middle Jordan Valley (from Wadi Fasael to Wadi 'Aujah) (in Hebrew). University of Haifa.
