= Shallum of Israel =

King of Ancient Israel

Shallum שַׁלּוּם
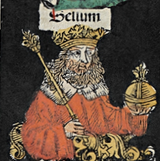
- Shallum of Israel from Hartmann Schedel's Nuremberg Chronicle.

King of Israel (Northern Kingdom)
- Reign: one month's duration, between 752 and 745 BC
- Predecessor: Zechariah
- Successor: Menahem
- Father: Jabesh

Shallum of Israel (Hebrew: שַׁלּוּם Šallūm, "retribution", fl. mid-8th century BC), was the fifteenth king of the ancient Kingdom of Israel, and the son of Jabesh, who reigned for only one month in 752 BCE.

== In the Bible ==
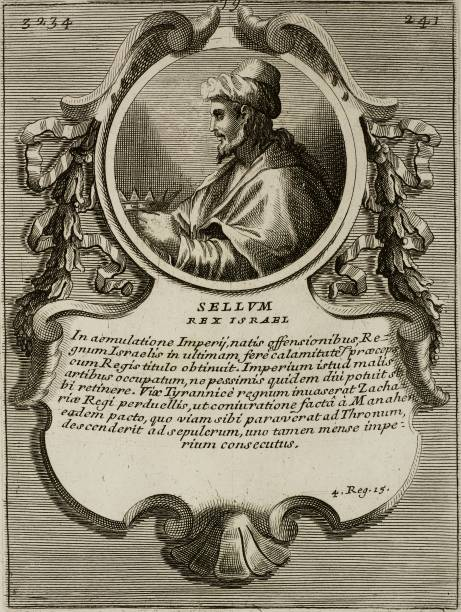
Shallum of Israel from Epitome historico-chronologica by Bartolomeo Gai (1751, Rome)

Originally a captain in the army of King Zechariah, Shallum "conspired against Zechariah, and smote him before the people; and slew him, and reigned in his stead" (2 Kings 15:10). He reigned only "a month of days in Samaria" (2 Kings 15:13) before Menahem—another captain from Zechariah's army—rose up and put Shallum to death (2 Kings 15:14–17). Menahem then became king in Shallum's stead.

In the Books of Kings (2 Kings, Chapter 15, verses 10, 13–14) Shallum's father is identified as Jabesh. However, the passage may instead mention a toponym, identifying that Shallum was "the son" of a city called Jabesh. In this view, Shallum may have originated from Jabesh-Gilead. The city is mentioned several times in the Biblical texts. In the Book of Judges (Chapter 21), the male inhabitants of the city are murdered and their virgin girls are given as brides to the men of the Tribe of Benjamin.

In the Books of Samuel, Jabesh-Gilead is under siege by Nahash of Ammon and his army. The siege is lifted when Saul leads an Israelite army to rescue the city. The victory allows Saul to be recognized as the legitimate King of Israel, as his claim to the throne was previously rejected. When Saul died, his corpse was taken by the Philistines and hung from the city walls of Beth-shan. The men of Jabesh-Gilead eventually managed to retrieve the corpses of Saul and his sons. The city cremated the corpses and buried their bones.

== In Antiquities of the Jews ==
Shallum is also depicted in the Greek-language history Antiquities of the Jews by Josephus, under the Hellenized names of Greek: Σελλούμ and Greek: Σελλήμ. Josephus primarily uses the inflected form of the name: "Sellëmos" (Greek: Σελλήμου). The name of Jabesh, Shallum's father, is Hellenized to "Jabësos".

Contradicting the Bible, Josephus depicts Shallum as a friend of his predecessor Zechariah of Israel. Josephus intentionally heightens the pathos (suffering) of Zechariah's assassination, by depicting him betrayed and killed by a friend. Josephus similarly depicts Jehoash of Judah and Amaziah of Judah as victims of assassination by their respective friends.

The location of the assassination is left unclear in the Biblical texts, with various Greek versions identifying it as the city of Ibleam or Keblaam (Greek: 'Ιεβλαάμ or Greek: Κεβλαάμ. Josephus simply mentions no location for the event.

In Josephus' narrative, Shallum murders Zechariah, seizes power over Israel, and reigns for thirty days. In this position, the Biblical sources speak of a fulfilled prophecy, that the House of Jehu (represented by Zechariah) would only reign for four generations. Josephus omits any reference to this supposed prophecy. Josephus similarly omits Biblical information that Shallum's seat of power was the city of Samaria, and that Shallum rose to the throne during the 39th regnal year of Uzziah, monarch of the Kingdom of Judah. Josephus has a tendency to abridge the narratives concerning the final few monarchs of Israel, with full-length narratives reserved only for Menahem and Hoshea.

Josephus' narrative next introduces Menahem under the Hellenized name Manaëmos (Greek: Μαναῆμος. He is identified with the Greek title of strategos, translating to general officer. In Josephus' narrative, Menahem is depicted as a general whose seat of power was the city of "Tharsë" (Greek: Θαρσῆ, identified with the city of Tirzah.

In the narrative, Menahem hears news that Zechariah has been assassinated, and then brings his entire army to Samaria to face Shallum. Josephus thus gives both a more detailed and a more plausible account of the event than the Biblical texts, where Menahem is seemingly acting alone.

== History ==
William F. Albright has dated his reign to 745 BC, while Hooker says 747. E.R. Thiele offers the date 752 BC.

== Sources ==
- Begg, Christopher (2000), "6. Zechariah & Shallum", Josephus' Story of the Later Monarchy, Leuven University Press, ISBN 978-9042907850
- Begg, Christopher (2000), "7. Menahem", Josephus' Story of the Later Monarchy, Leuven University Press, ISBN 978-9042907850
- Freedman, David Noel; Myers, Allen C. (2000), "Jabesh", Eerdmans Dictionary of the Bible, Amsterdam University Press, ISBN 978-9053565032
- Kaiser, Walter C. Jr; Wegner, Paul D. (2017), "Index", A History of Israel: From the Bronze Age through the Jewish Wars, B&H Publishing Group, ISBN 978-1433643170

Shallum of Israel House of Jabesh; Contemporary Kings of Judah: Uzziah/Azariah
Regnal titles
Preceded by Zachariah	King of Israel; 752 BCE	Succeeded by Menahem
