= Israelite highland settlement =

Iron Age population expansion in the Southern Levant

Coordinates: 32°3′N 35°17′E

- c. 1250 BCE – c. 900 BCE
Late Bronze Age collapse	Ancient Israel and Judah
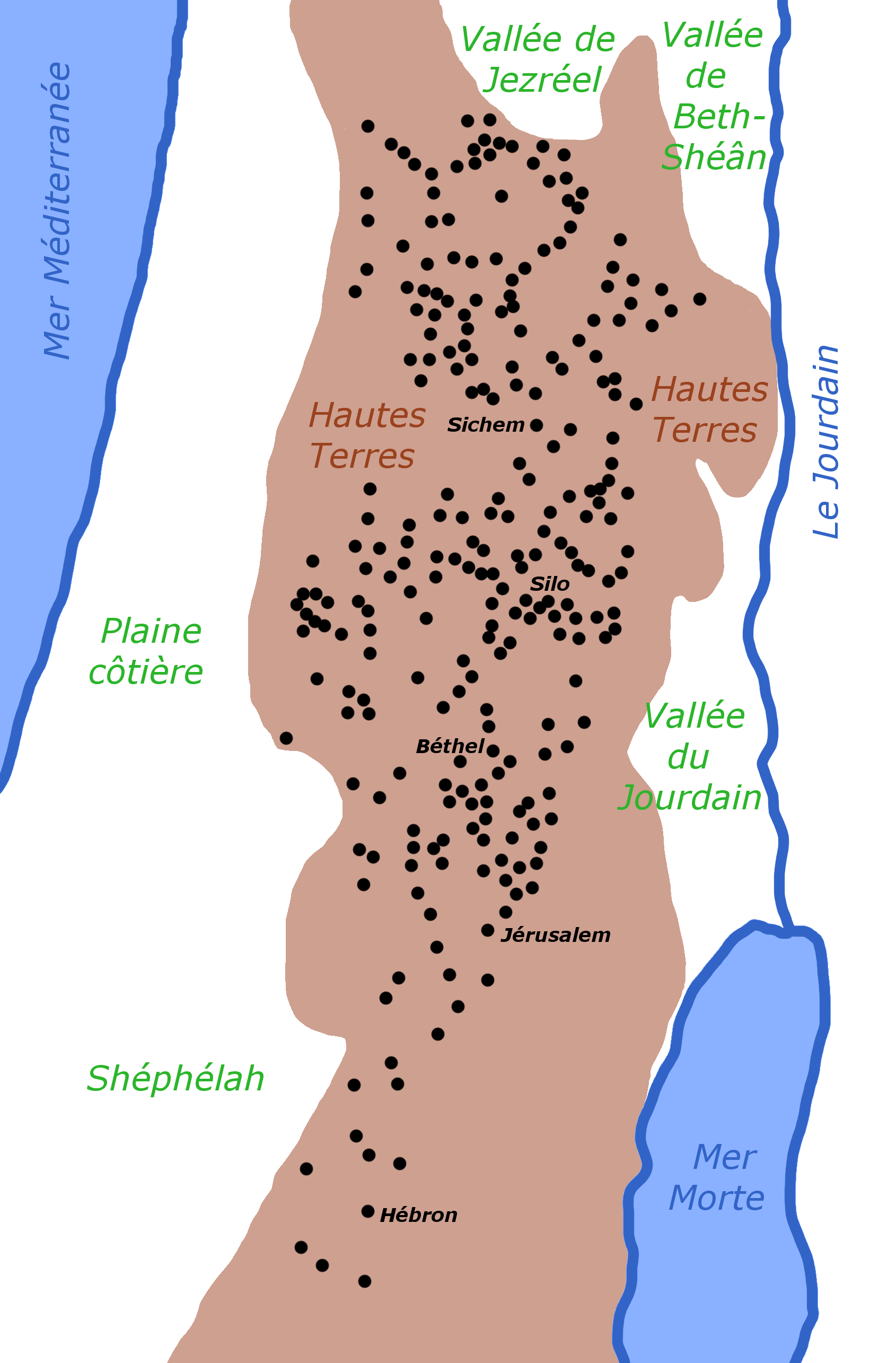
- French-language map of Iron Age I settlements (black) in Canaan's central highlands (brown), based on the book The Bible Unearthed.
- Duration: c. 3 centuries
- Location: Southern Levant
- Leaders: Biblical judges (traditional account)

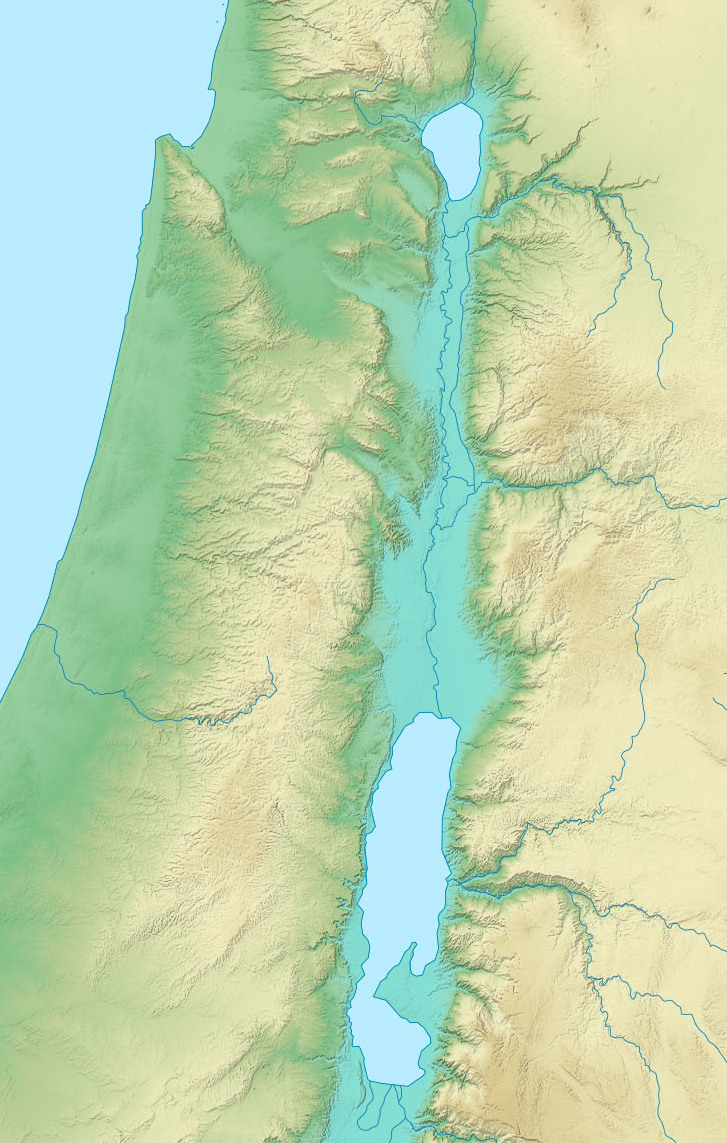
Topographic map showing the central hills

Israelite highland settlement, also known as the Israelite settlement or the Settlement Period (Hebrew: תקופת ההתנחלות), refers to the Early Iron Age (Iron I) growth of agrarian villages in the hills of Canaan, particularly in the region of Samaria, associated with the emergence of the Israelites.

== Archaeology ==
Following the Six-Day War in 1967, the West Bank became the subject of intensive archaeological field surveys. Among these initiatives was the Manasseh Hill Country Survey, launched in 1978 under the direction of Israeli archaeologist Adam Zertal.

Studies show that amid the Late Bronze Age collapse around 1200 BCE, the number of inhabited communities in the hill country increased from approximately 25 to 250, with the total population reaching roughly 45,000. The surrounding lowlands do not appear to have experienced a similar expansion.

In a 2005 book, Robert D. Miller applied statistical modeling to the sizes and locations of the settlements, grouping them by economic and political features. He identified highland clusters centered on Dothan, Tirzah, Shechem, and Shiloh. The analysis suggested that the territory traditionally attributed to the Tribe of Benjamin lacked a central site.

The scarcity of pig bones found in the highlands compared to neighboring populations may indicate religious restrictions on the consumption of pork among early Israelites.

The biblical account of the Israelites' emergence through military conquest is debated, with archaeological evidence instead supporting models of ethnogenesis centered on Yahwism and involving local Canaanites, sedentarizing pastoralists, and marginal groups such as the ʿApiru and Shasu.

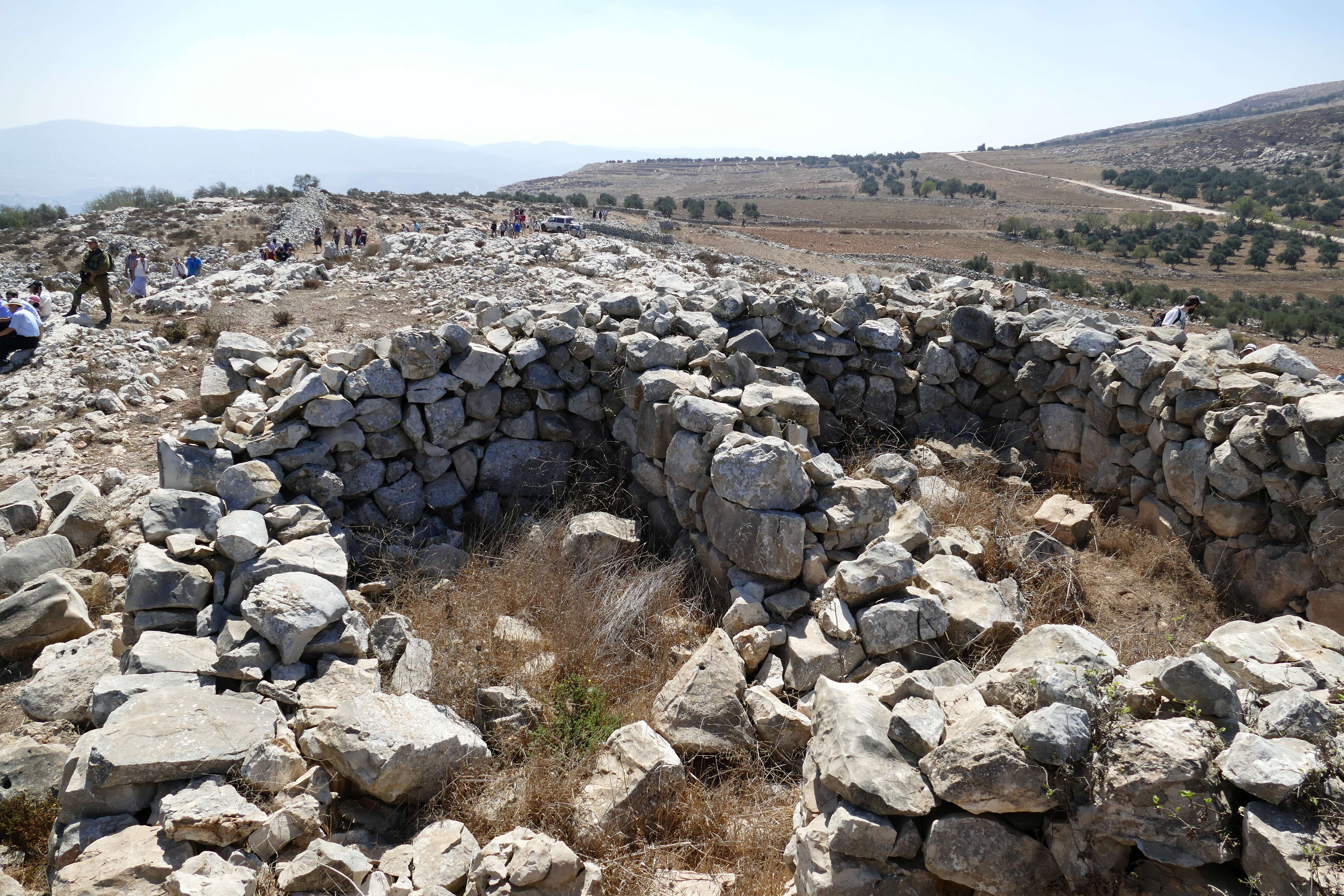
Mount Ebal site with a stone structure.

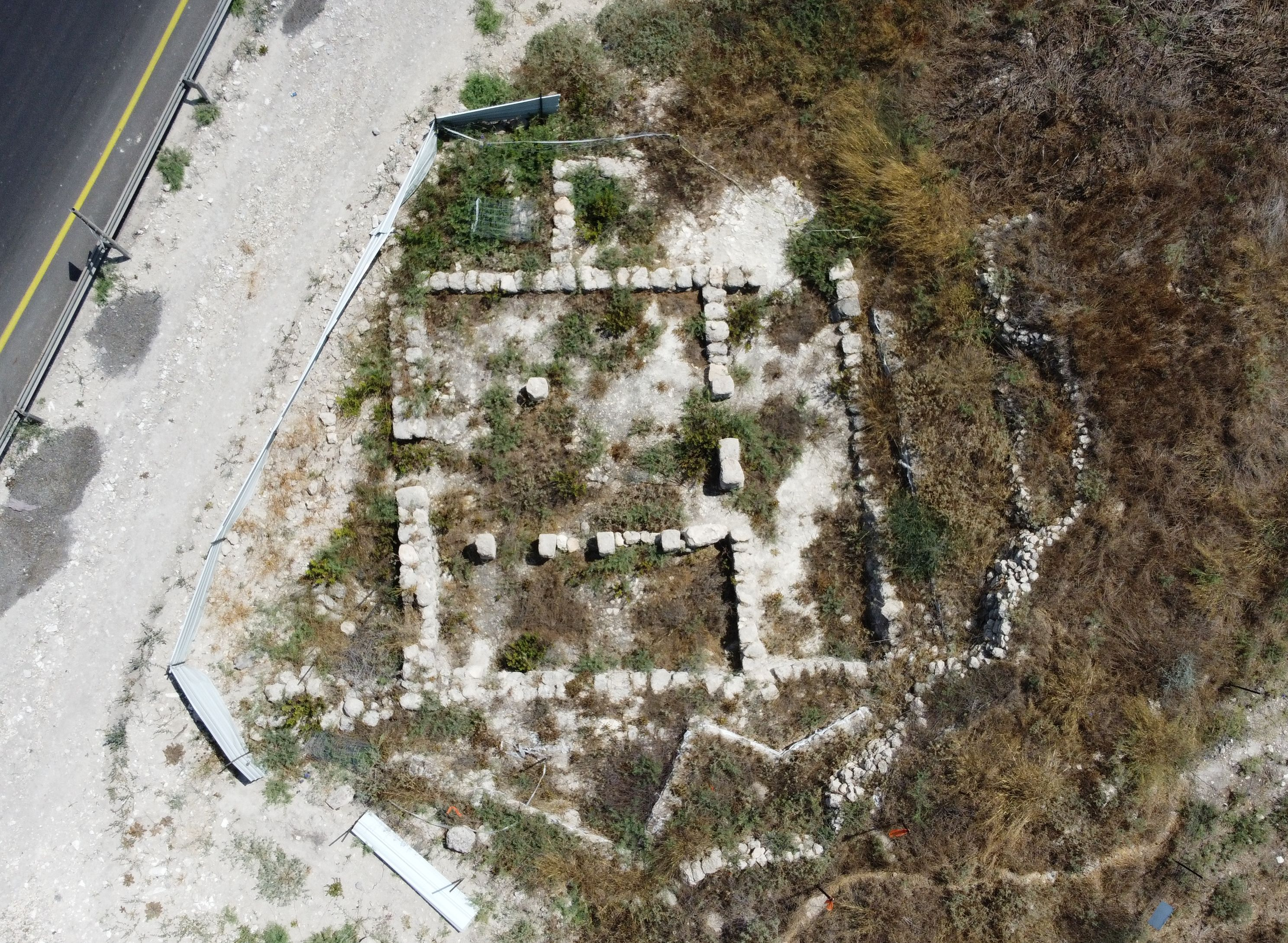
Ruins of a four-room house at Tel Beit Shemesh, a layout typical of the Iron I highlands.

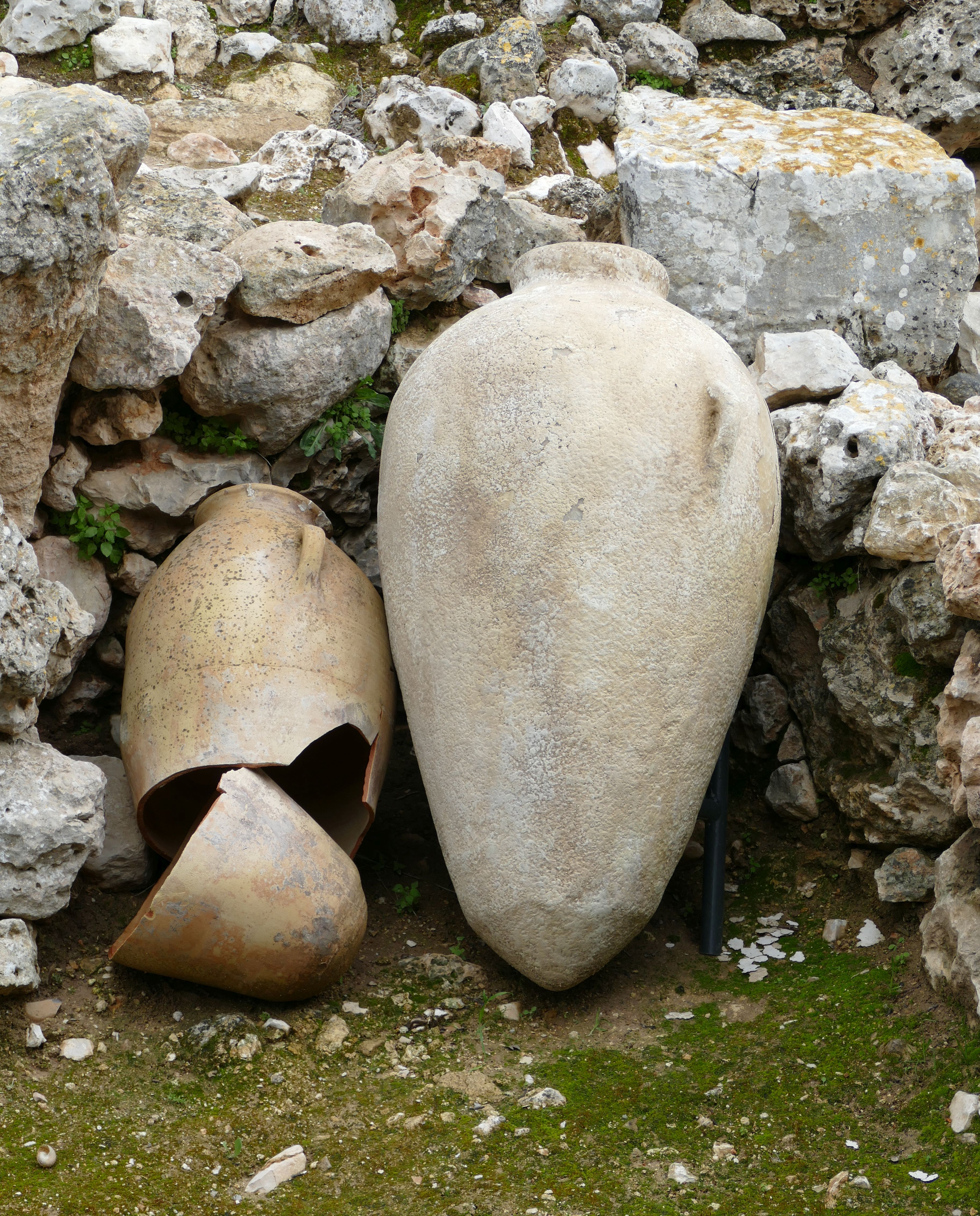
Collared-rim jars from Shiloh, a pottery type common in highland settlements.

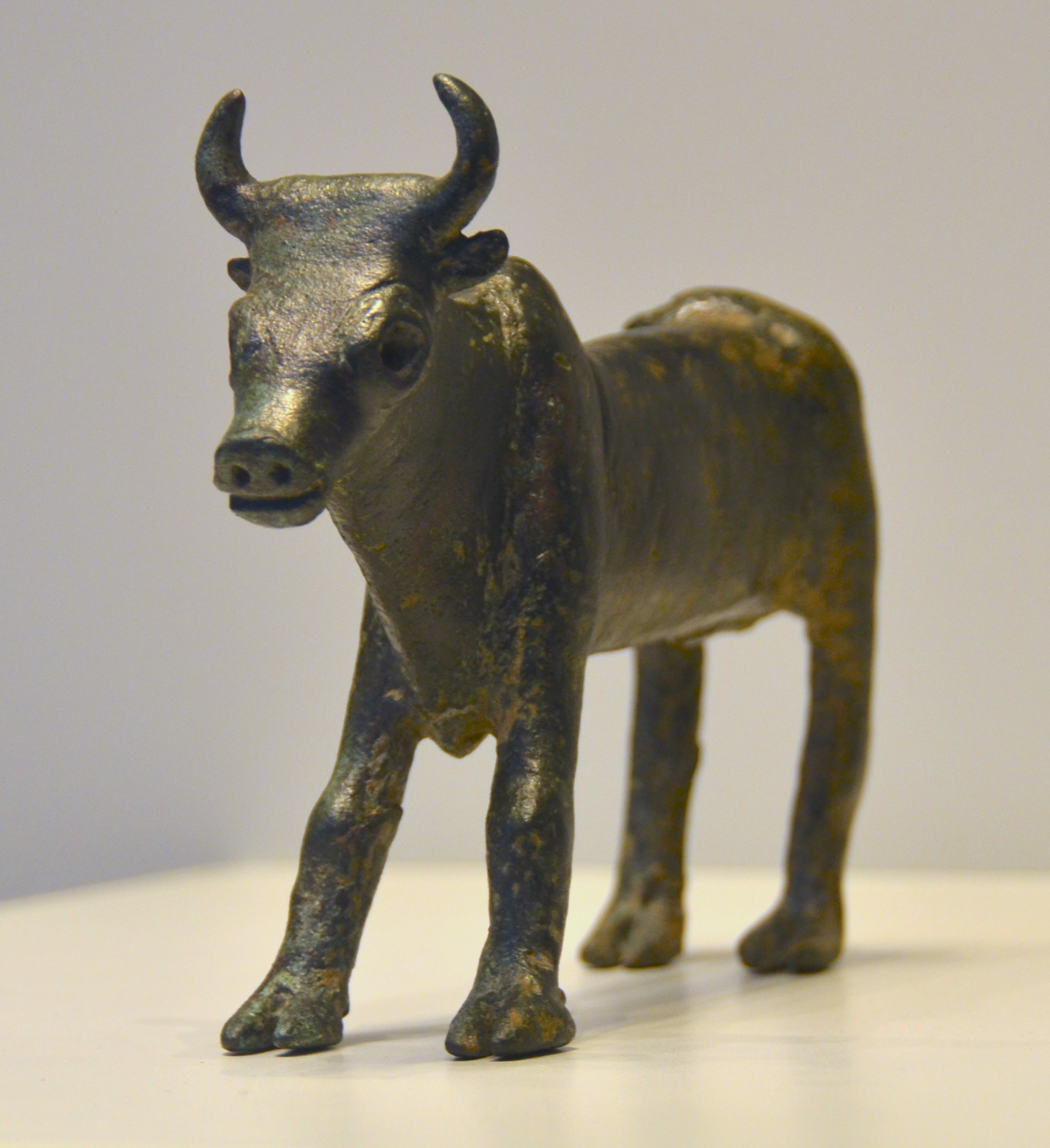
Zebu statuette from the Bull Site sanctuary.

== Notable sites ==
- Beth-zur
- Bethel
- Bull Site
- Et-Tell (Ai)
- Gibeon
- Giloh
- Izbet Sartah [in Hebrew]
- Khirbet el-Maqatir
- Khirbet el-Mastarah
- Mount Ebal site
- Shiloh
- Tel Rumeida (Hebron)
- Tell el-Ful (Gibeah)
- Tell en-Nasbeh (Mizpah)
- Tirzah

== Biblical narrative ==
The Book of Joshua describes the conquest of Canaan, including the Fall of Jericho and the Battle of the Waters of Merom.

The list of unconquered Canaanite cities in the Book of Judges was likely derived from the tribal allotment descriptions in Joshua and may reflect the reality of the 10th century BCE. If the biblical expression "daughter villages" (as in "Nor did Manasseh drive out Beit She'an and her daughter villages…") denotes settlements dependent on a principal city, then archaeological surveys correspond to Judges 1:27–35, which lists the towns that remained outside Israelite control: Beit She'an, Taanach, Ibleam, Megiddo, Dor, Gezer, Ajalon, Shaalbim, and Jerusalem.

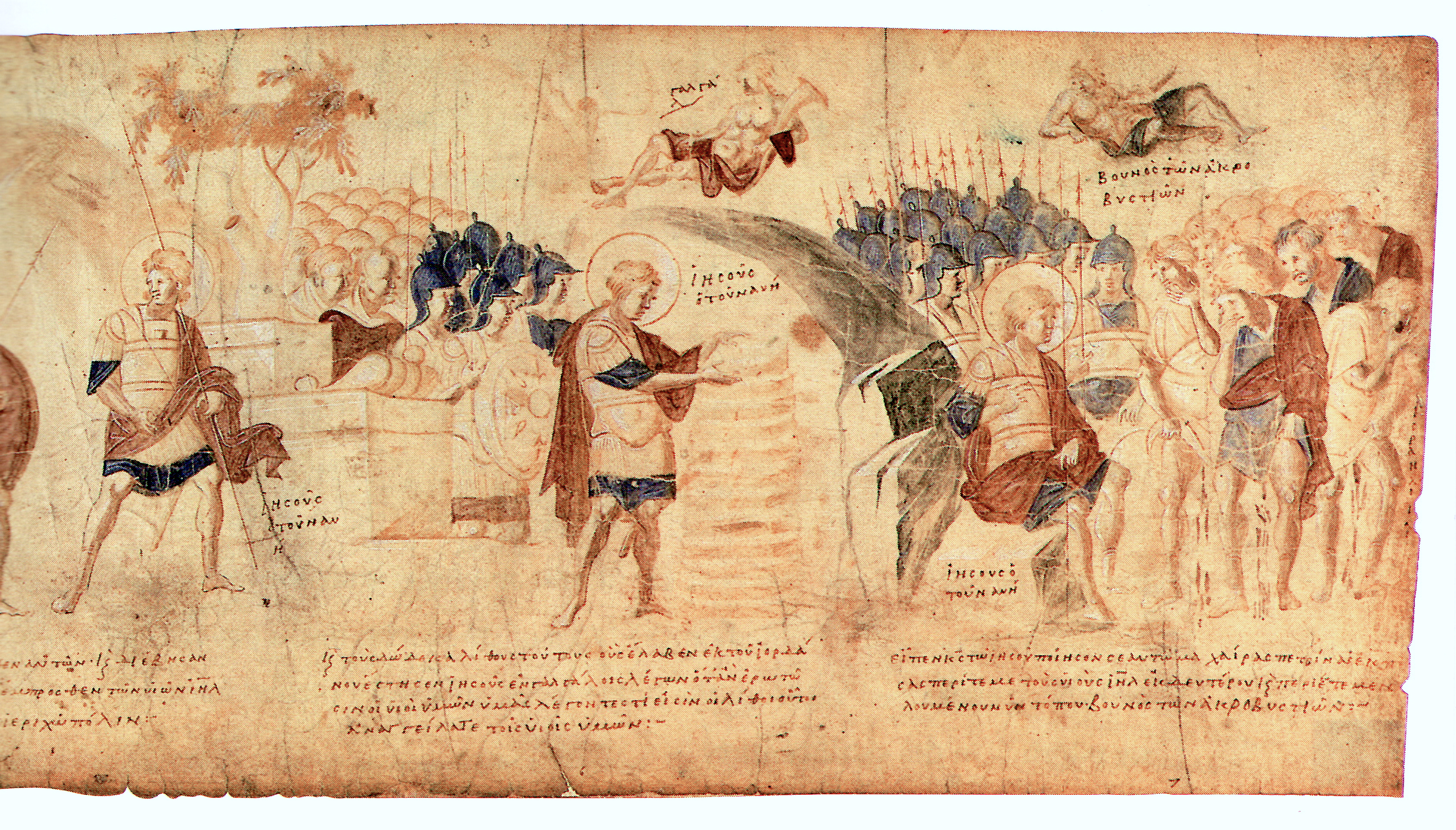
Joshua and the Israelites, from the Byzantine Joshua Roll manuscript

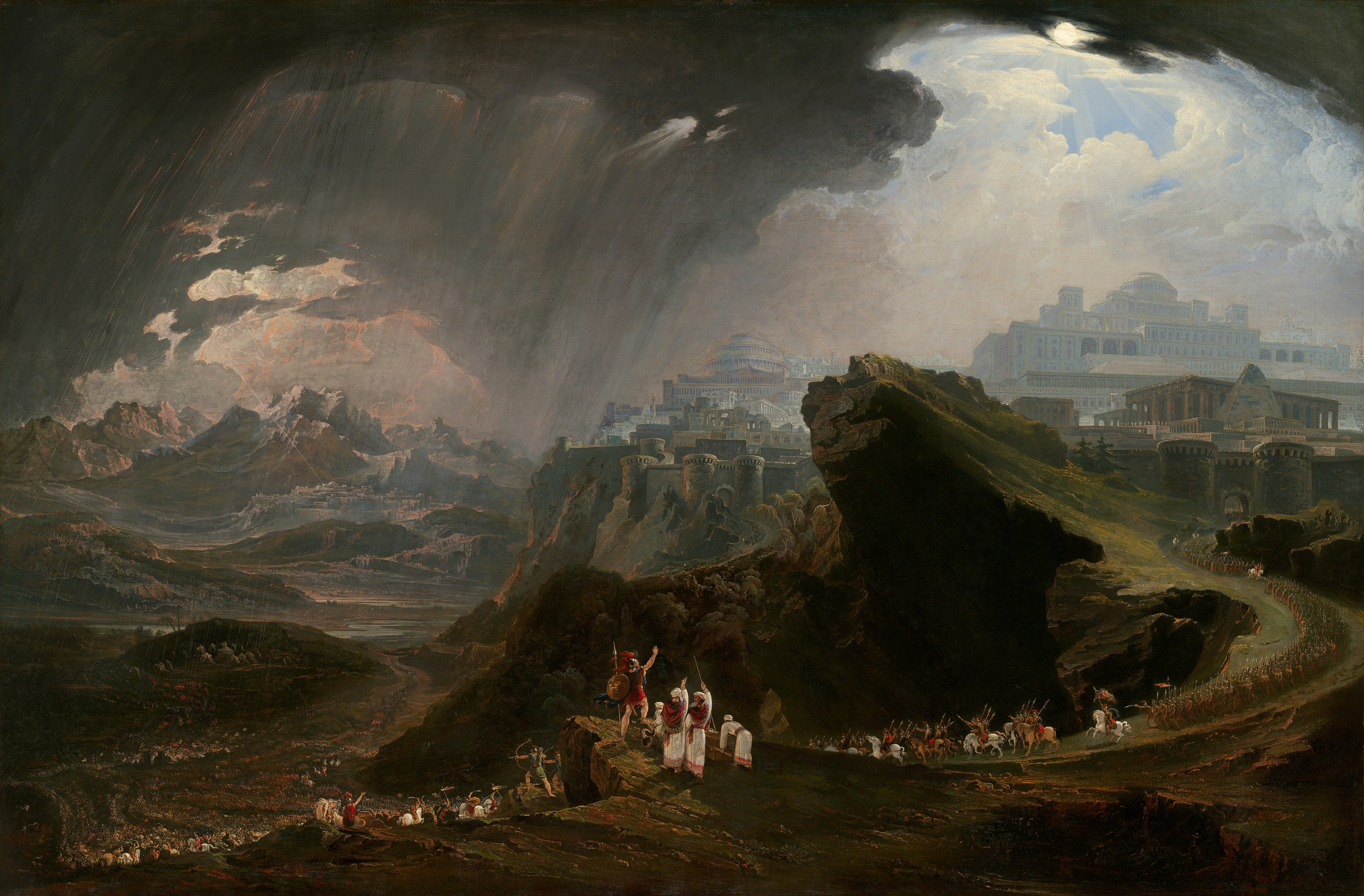
Joshua Commanding the Sun to Stand Still upon Gibeon, an 1816 painting by John Martin

== See also ==
- Demographic history of Palestine (region)
- End of the 19th Dynasty – Period of Ancient Egypt
- Merneptah Stele – Inscription by the ancient Egyptian pharaoh Merneptah
- Timeline of ancient Israel and Judah

== Sources ==
- Bloch-Smith, Elizabeth; Nakhai, Beth Alpert (June 1999). "A Landscape Comes to Life: Iron Age I" (PDF). Near Eastern Archaeology. 62 (2). American Schools of Oriental Research: 62–92. doi:10.2307/3210703. JSTOR 3210703.
- Dever, William G. (2003). Who Were the Early Israelites and Where Did They Come from?. William B. Eerdmans Publishing Company. ISBN 978-0802844163.
- Faust, Avraham (2016). "The Emergence of Israel and Theories of Ethnogenesis". In Niditch, Susan (ed.). The Wiley Blackwell Companion to Ancient Israel. Wiley-Blackwell. pp. 155–173. doi:10.1002/9781118774199.ch9. ISBN 978-0-470-65677-8.
- Faust, Avraham (2023). "The Birth of Israel" (PDF). In Williamson, Hugh G. M.; Hoyland, Robert G. (eds.). The Oxford History of the Holy Land. Oxford University Press. pp. 5–33. doi:10.1093/oso/9780192886866.003.0002. ISBN 9780192886866.
- Finkelstein, Israel; Mazar, Amihai (2007). Schmidt, Brian B. (ed.). The Quest for the Historical Israel: Debating Archaeology and the History of Early Israel. Society of Biblical Literature. ISBN 978-1-58983-277-0.
- Finkelstein, Israel; Na'aman, Nadav (1994). "The 'Conquest of Canaan' in the Book of Joshua and in History". From Nomadism to Monarchy: Archaeological and Historical Aspects of Early Israel. Jerusalem: Yad Izhak Ben-Zvi. pp. 218–281. ISBN 965-217-117-4.
- Finkelstein, Israel; Silberman, Neil Asher (2001). The Bible Unearthed: Archaeology's New Vision of Ancient Israel and the Origin of Its Sacred Texts. Free Press. ISBN 9780743223386.
- Ilan, David (2018). "The "Conquest" of the Highlands in the Iron Age I". In Yasur-Landau, Assaf; Cline, Eric H.; Rowan, Yorke M. (eds.). The Social Archaeology of the Levant: From Prehistory to the Present. Cambridge University Press. pp. 283–309. doi:10.1017/9781316661468.017. ISBN 9781316661468.
- Killebrew, Ann E. (2020). "Early Israel's Origins, Settlement, and Ethnogenesis". In Kelle, Brad E.; Strawn, Brent A. (eds.). The Oxford Handbook of the Historical Books of the Hebrew Bible. Oxford University Press. pp. 79–93. doi:10.1093/OXFORDHB/9780190261160.013.33. ISBN 9780190261160.
- Miller, Robert D., II (2005). Chieftains of the Highland Clans: A History of Israel in the 12th and 11th Centuries BC. William B. Eerdmans Publishing Company. ISBN 9781725231450.
