= Mount Ebal lead object =

Artifact discovered at Mount Ebal, West Bank

- Material: Lead sheet
- Size: 2 cm × 2 cm (0.79 in × 0.79 in)
- Discovered: December 2019; Mount Ebal, West Bank; 32°14′7″N 35°16′9″E

The Mount Ebal Lead Object (also known as the 'Mount Ebal Curse Tablet') is a folded lead sheet reportedly found on Mount Ebal in the West Bank, near Nablus, in December 2019. The artifact was discovered by a team of archaeologists led by Scott Stripling.

Stripling's team claims it is the oldest known Hebrew inscription, preceding the Khirbet Qeiyafa ostracon by at least two centuries (with the curse tablet dated to around 1200 BC). The tablet has been the subject of scholarly skepticism, centered around tardy peer review and sensational claims with little evidence to back them up. Most of the skeptics contend it contains no legible writing at all.

The alleged inscription was published in May 2023. The claimed findings were nearly universally rejected by scholarly commentators.

== Discovery ==
The folded lead object was discovered at Mount Ebal in December 2019 through a process called wet sifting, where ancient stones covered in dirt are hand-washed. The tablet had nearly been mistaken for a stone, but had "popped out" once rinsed under water.

== Inscription ==
Since the folded piece of lead could not be opened, Stripling et al. used x-ray tomography to scan the inside. After viewing the scans, team member Gershon Galil claimed to find an inscription made up of 48 separate glyphs and claimed those proposed letters resulted in the following text:

[You are] cursed by the god yhw, cursed.

[You will die], cursed – cursed, [you will surely die].

Cursed [you are] by yhw – cursed.

— Stripling, Gershon et al., "You are Cursed by the God YHW:" an early Hebrew inscription from Mt. Ebal, 2023

The use of the term YHWH (which, if proven to be inscribed on the tablet, would be the oldest example of its appearance written in paleo-Hebrew characters by centuries) as the Hebrew word for God would define the inscription as early Hebrew and not Canaanite.

== Analysis ==
The lead was analyzed at Hebrew University by Naama Yahalom-Mack, using bits of the tablet that had broken off during a failed malleability test. The lead is consistent with ore from Lavrion, Greece.

X-ray tomography was undertaken in collaboration with scientists from the Academy of Sciences of the Czech Republic including Ivana Kumpova, Jaroslav Valach, and Daniel Vavrik. Two epigraphers were enlisted to examine the scans for discernible letters: Pieter Gert van der Veen of Johannes Gutenberg-Universität Mainz and Gershon Galil of Haifa University.

In 2024 Galil self-published a non-refereed book in Hebrew and in English presenting his analysis of the Ebal lead object. Appendices at the end of the book include discussions of artifacts Galil believes are similar to the Ebal lead object, namely: The Lachish milk bowl ostracon and the so-called Jerusalem curse inscription. Galil claims both lead objects should be understood as 'Proto-Canaanite curse tablets' written in a style similar to reputed 'Ebal tablet'.

== Controversy ==
Photos of the outside of the curse tablet were published on social media and subsequently in mass media before the peer review process. This type of behavior has been criticized by Israeli archaeologists and historians in an open letter.

After the peer review article was published, The Times of Israel asked multiple archaeologists and epigraphical experts for comment, but the only two who agreed to give their opinion stated that they did not believe the article was convincing. Christopher Rollston wrote: "This article is basically a text-book case of the Rorschach Test, and the authors of this article have projected upon a piece of lead the things they want it to say." Aren Maeir only said: "I don't accept all the interpretations that were suggested in the article, and I plan to publish a different opinion in an academic journal".

Much skepticism and support of the discovery has been exacerbated by Biblical connections to Mount Ebal, which was the site of a supposed altar built by Joshua around the same time that the artifact has been dated to.

Three articles published in Israel Exploration Journal in late 2023 attacked the claims of the original researchers. Christopher Rollston and Aren Maeir argued that there was no writing on the artifact at all but just random bumps and scratches, arranged in a haphazard fashion that didn't match the published drawings. Amihai Mazar identified the object as a sinker used in fishing nets. Naama Yahalom-Mack, though agreeing with the Greek origin of the lead, noted that the mine was also in operation much later than the alleged date.

Around the same time, Raz Kletter also published a paper which criticized both Galil for purportedly inventing the inscription, and Maeir for misguided criticism of Galil's character, rather than the contents of his publications.

In early 2024 Mark Haughwout proposed that if the artifact wasn't simply an old piece of lead, it was more likely to be from the Roman period, perhaps an ancient theater ticket (which were often made of lead and folded after admission).

Scott Stripling and Peter van der Veen published an online point-by-point response to Haughwout's article. In another comment, Van der Veen - one of the original authors of the article containing the disputed claims, disavowed Galil's version of the inscription, but took a middle position stating that marks and characters in the shape of paleo-Hebrew letters are quite clear to him—thus, he contends that the totalizing dismissals of the artifact (implying the interpretation that the lead seal contains no inscription at all) are at least as exaggerated as his co-author Galil's questionable translation of the inscription, if not moreso. Kletter's article, admonishing Mazar (as well as Galil), provisionally supports Van der Veen's objection, though Kletter's objections to Mazar's extreme and exaggerated demolition of Galil's interpretation are made on a broadly epistemological basis, whereas Van der Veen's objections to this dismissal rely upon the discernibility of the evidence in scans of the seal—claiming that there are discernible character markings on the interior of the seal, however damaged and largely illegible the full content of the inscription may be—and will stand or fall on the basis of this assertion.

In her 2026 review of the evidence, Yoonee Ahn refers to the lead object as “highly contested”. Ahn considers it in the context of the known inscriptions from this early time period such as the Izbet Sartah abecedary, the Khirbet Qeiyafa ostracon, and the general difficulties in reconstructing the earliest phases of Hebrew script. She also suggests that “such pre-Iron Age inscriptions must be interpreted within a pan-Canaanite rather than narrowly Hebrew framework”.

== See also ==
- Mount Ebal site
- Ancient Hebrew writings
- Hebrew language
