= Chocolate-on-white ware =

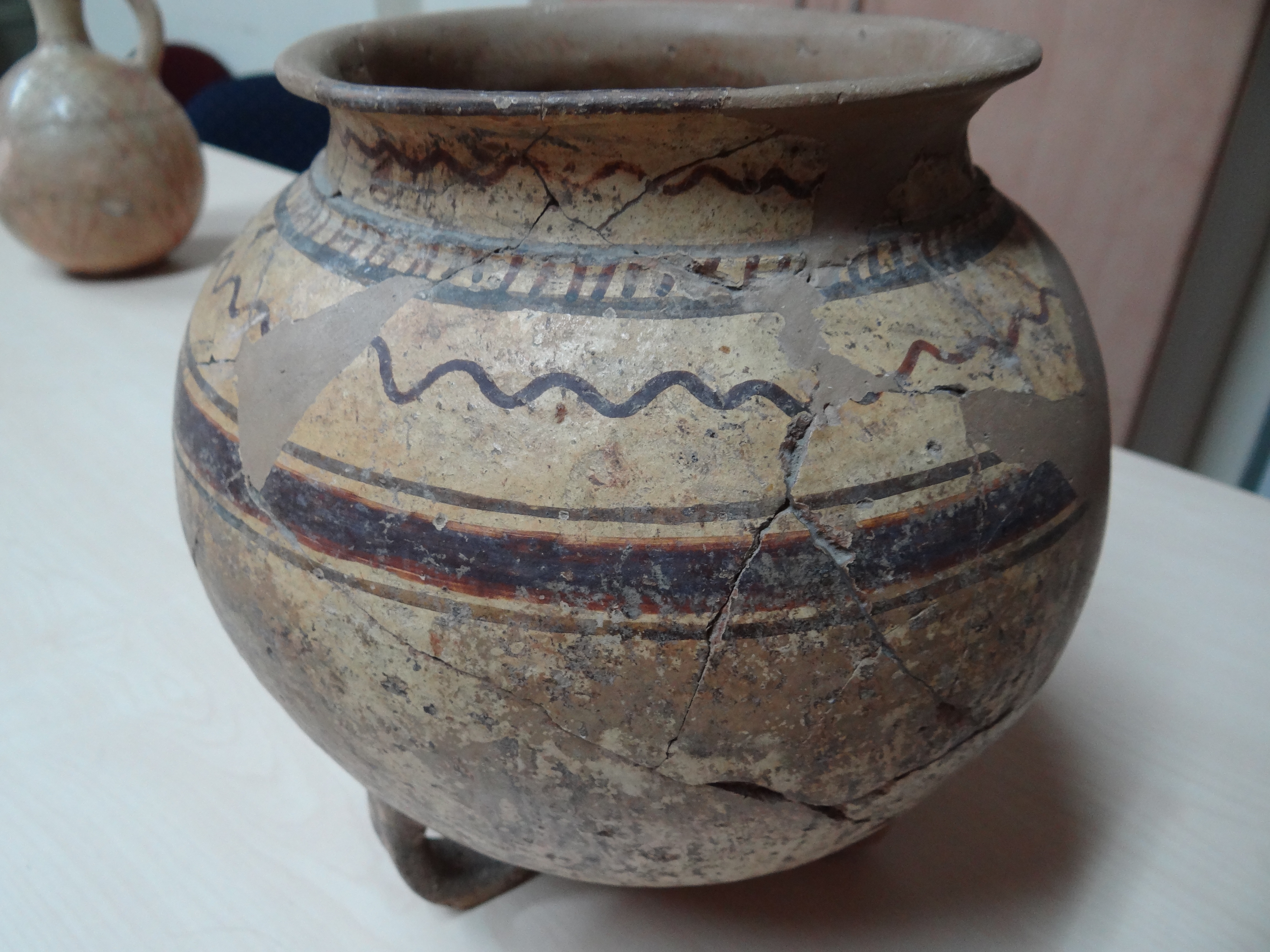
Chocolate on white ware jug. collections room of the Department of Archaeology University of Haifa

Chocolate-on-White ware is the description commonly given to an important diagnostic ceramic type of Bronze Age Southern Levant. It is characterized by a white slip and dark-brown or black decorations on it. Often it is also classified as bichrome (or two-coloured) decorated pottery ware, although it also sometimes comes in monochrome variety.

Such distinctive pottery was produced during the later part of the Middle Bronze Age and the Late Bronze Age I. A comprehensive study of the typology, chronology and possible provenance of the Chocolate-on-White wares was made by P.M. Fischer in 1999 based on material from the settlement of Tell Abu-al-Kharaz in the Jordan Valley.

This type of pottery is found in the Jordan valley and east of it.

== Recent excavations ==
In 1989, a Swedish team under the direction of P.M. Fischer started excavations at the settlement of Tell Abu al-Kharaz in Jordan Valley, where Chocolate-on-White Wares had been found. Ten seasons of excavations (state 1999) produced 347 stratified vessels, which were included within the Chocolate-on-White Ware group as satisfying a number of listed criteria.

Most of the bichrome-decorated and monochrome-decorated Chocolate-on-White Ware vessels were bowls, chalices, goblets, kraters, juglets and jugs, and jars. The wares were confirmed in Phases IV/1 and 2, V and VI and include six sub-groups:

- Proto-Chocolate-on-White Bichrome Ware,
- Chocolate-on-White Bichrome Ware,
- Eggshell Ware, and
- Chocolate-on-White I, II and III.

== Chronology ==
The chronological framework, which is supported by radiocarbon dates and cross-references with Cyprus, shows that the ware was produced from the late Middle Bronze Age IIB until the beginning of the Late Bronze Age IB.

Trade and the possible provenance of the different wares have been considered by excavators.

The petrographically analysed pottery samples point to two production areas: the Central Jordan Valley, and southern Lebanon. The pottery included both burnished and unburnished bichrome-decorated types.

Chocolate-on-white ware has been found at sites in Lebanon, Israel, Jordan and Palestine; there is no confirmed find of such pottery on Cyprus or in the Aegean.

Some samples of Chocolate-on-white ware were identified at Tell el-Ajjul from the horizons dating to 1640-1410 BC, and also from Tell el-Dab'a in Egypt.

== See also ==
- Cypriot Bichrome ware
- Philistine Bichrome ware
- Tell el-Yahudiyeh Ware

== Bibliography ==
Fischer, Peter M. [1999], "Chocolate-on-White Ware: Typology, Chronology and Provenance - The Evidence from Tell Abu al-Kharaz, Jordan Valley", BASOR 313 [1999], pp. 1–29.
