= Jabesh =

Jabesh (Hebrew: יָבֵשׁ, romanized: ja'-besh) was the father of Shallum of the Kingdom of Israel according to the Hebrew Bible.

Jabesh is mentioned In the Books of Kings (2 Kings 15:10, 2 Kings 15:13–14). However, the passage may instead mention a toponym, identifying that Shallum was "the son" of a city called Jabesh. In this view, Shallum may have originated from the Israelite town of Jabesh-Gilead.

The name means "dry" in Hebrew.

== See also ==
- Jabesh-Gilead
