= Hanun =

- King of Ammon
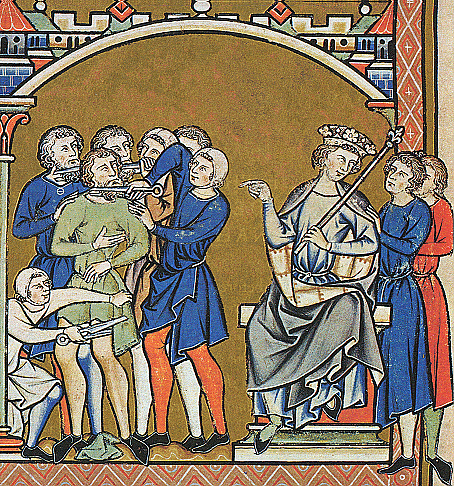
- Illustration from the Morgan Bible depicting Hanun humiliating David's ambassadors.
- Reign: c. 1000/990s–980s BCE
- Predecessor: Nahash
- Successor: Shobi
- Born: c. late 11th BCE
- Father: Nahash

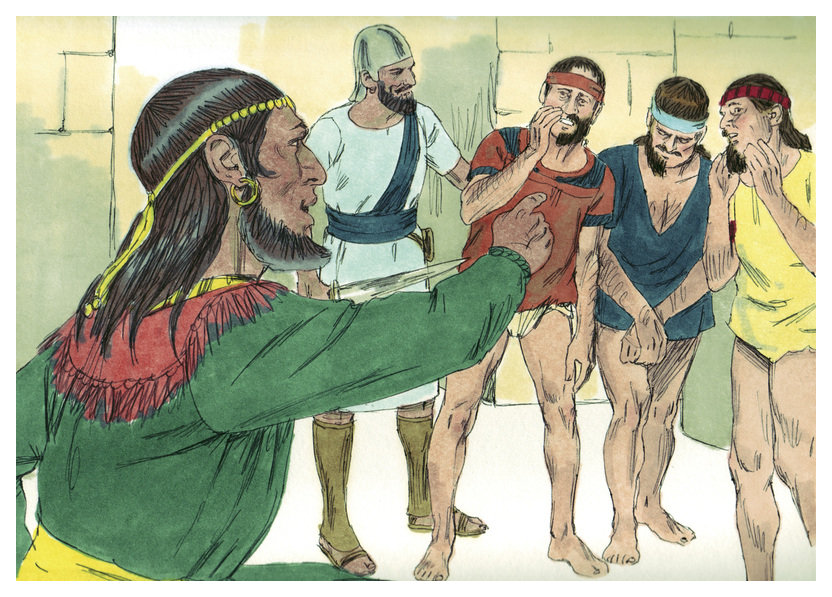

Hanun (/ˈheɪnən/ Hebrew: חָנוּן Ḥānūn) was a king of Ammon described in 2 Samuel and 1 Chronicles.

== Biblical narrative ==
Upon the death of his father Nahash, Hanun ascended to the throne of the Ammonites. When King David sent ambassadors to convey his condolences, Hanun listened to the suspicions of the "princes of the people of Ammon", reversed his father's pro-Davidic policy and humiliated the emissaries, stripping them of their clothes and shaving half of their beards. He allied with the Syrian king Hadadezer against Israel but was defeated and deposed. His brother Shobi was made king in his stead and became a loyal vassal of David.

== Other people of this name ==
Two other people in the Hebrew Bible also called Hanun were:

1. A Jew who returned from the Babylonian Exile and, with the people of Zanoah, repaired the valley gate in the wall of Jerusalem. (Nehemiah iii. 13)
2. The sixth son of Zalaph, who also assisted in the repairing of the wall (Nehemiah iii. 30).
