= Jabesh-Gilead =

Ancient Israelite town in the Gilead, mentioned in the Hebrew Bible

Jabesh-Gilead (Hebrew: יָבֵשׁ גִּלְעָד Yāḇēš Gilʿāḏ), sometimes shortened to Jabesh, was an ancient Israelite town in Gilead, in northwest Jordan. Jabesh is mentioned several times in the Hebrew Bible primarily in connection with King Saul's battles against the Ammonites and Philistines.

Jabesh Gilead means Jabesh of Gilead or Jabesh in Gilead, i.e. the town Jabesh in the region of Gilead, as opposed to other towns called Jabesh in other parts of the country.

Jabesh means "dry" in Hebrew, a name possibly attributed to the site's well-draining soil. Gilead means 'heap [of stones] of testimony'. There is also an alternative theory that it means 'rocky region'. [Smith's Bible Dictionary, "Gil'e-ad"].

== History ==
=== In the Hebrew Bible ===
Jabesh-Gilead is mentioned in the Book of Judges, in the first and second Books of Samuel, and in the Book of Chronicles.

==== Benjaminite War ====
Jabesh is mentioned in the biblical episode of the Levite's concubine, also known as the Benjamite War, during which eleven tribes of Israel had massacred the Tribe of Benjamin. The eleven tribes relented from wiping out the whole tribe, and decided that they needed to find wives for the 600 remaining Benjaminite men since all other people in Benjamin had been killed. However, they had taken an oath not to give their daughters to a Benjaminite, so they found the one city in Israel that had not joined the fight: Jabesh. The city's inhabitants were executed under the Herem except for 400 virgins. They brought back 400 virgins from Jabesh and gave them to the men on Rimmon Rock (Judges 21:8–15).

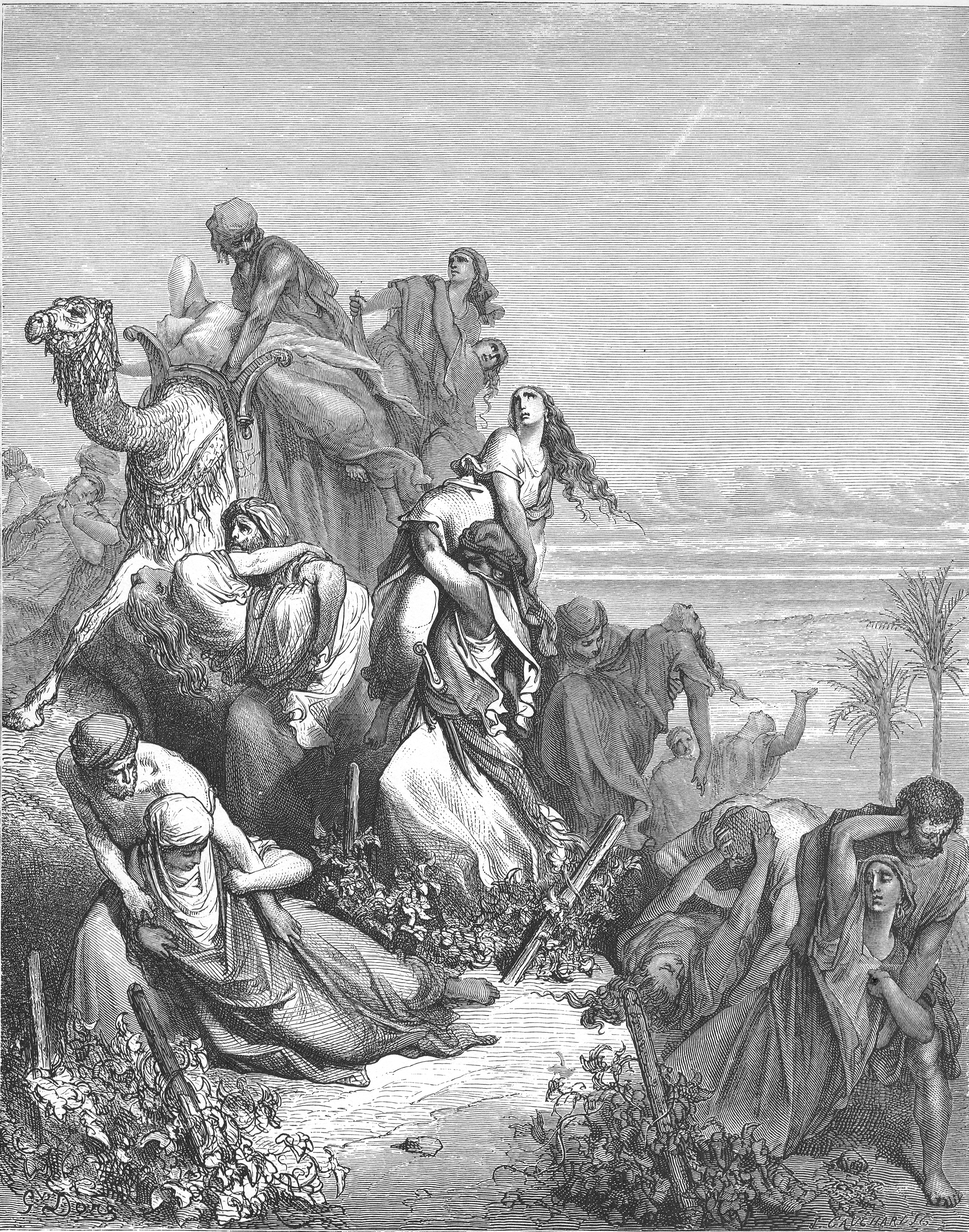
The Benjaminites take the virgins of Jabesh-gilead, drawing by Gustave Doré

==== Nahash of Ammon ====
Jabesh-Gilead is a central setting of 1 Samuel 11. After Saul is anointed by Samuel, Nahash of Ammon attacks Jabesh-Gilead. Having subjected the town to a siege, its inhabitants sought terms for surrender, but were told by Nahash that they had a choice of death by sword or having their right eyes gouged out. The population obtained seven days' grace from Nahash, during which they would be allowed to seek help from the Israelites, after which they would have to submit to the terms of surrender. The town's inhabitants sought help from the people of Israel, sending messengers throughout the whole territory, and Saul responded by raising an army which decisively defeated Nahash and his cohorts at Bezek. After the war is over, the Israelites assemble at Gilgal to renew Saul's kingship over Israel.

==== Saul's death ====
After Saul falls on his sword during the Battle of Gilboa, the victorious Philistines recover his body as well as those of his three sons who also died in the battle, decapitate them and display them on the wall of Beit She'an. At night, the inhabitants of Jabesh-Gilead retrieve the bodies, showing their devotion to the rescuer of the city. Following a funeral pyre, the bones of Saul and his sons were buried under the tamarisk tree in Jabesh (1 Samuel 31:8–13, 1 Chronicles 10:12). When David learns it was the men of Jabesh-Gilead who had brought Saul to an honorable burial, he sent messengers to bless them "And David sent messengers to the men of Yavesh-Gilad, and said to them: ‘May you be blessed of Hashem, that you have shown this kindness to your lord, to Saul, and buried him.’”(2 Samuel 2:4–7). Later, David takes the bones of Saul and of his son Jonathan from Jabesh and buries them in Zela, in the tomb of Saul's father (2 Samuel 21:12–14).

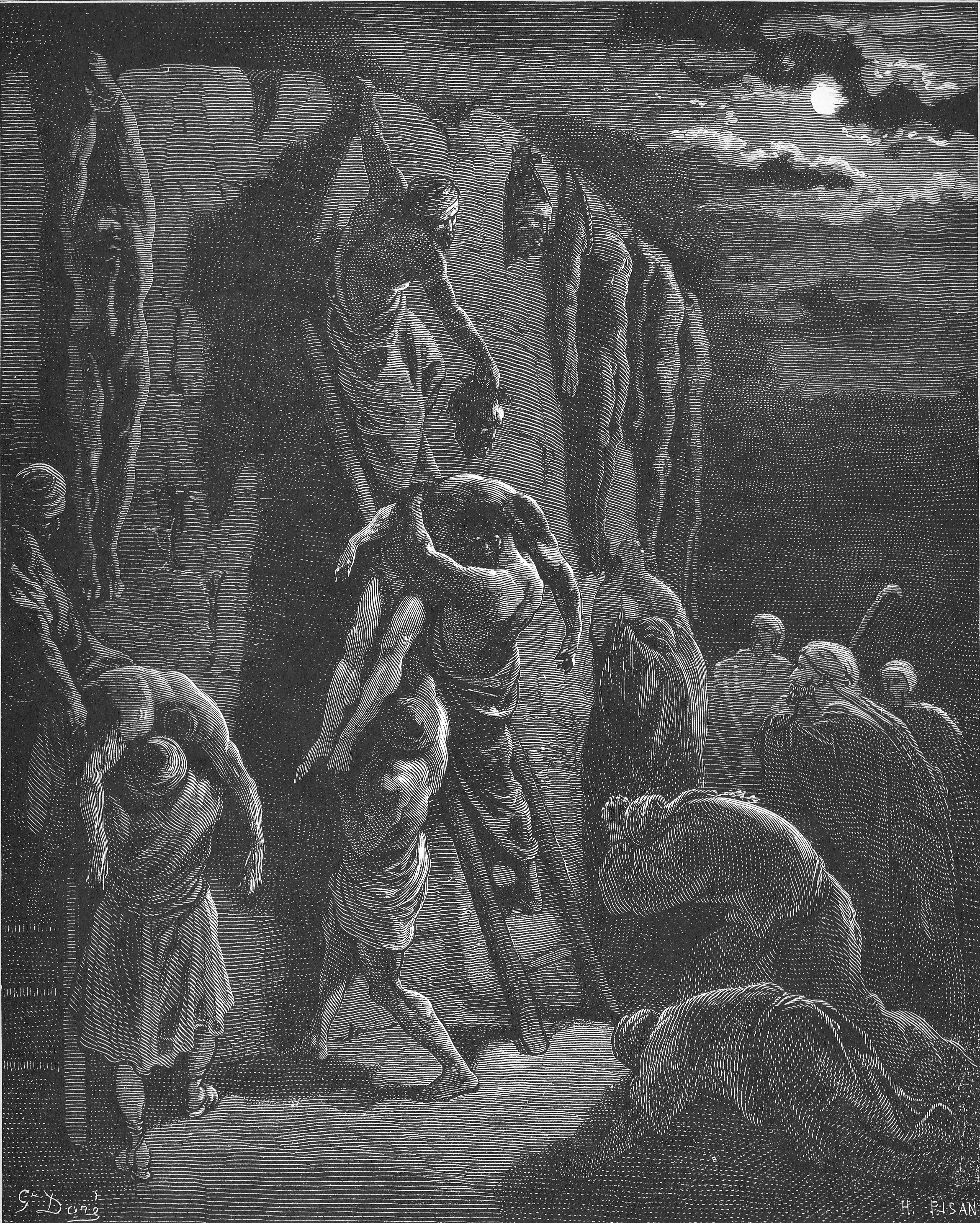
Jabesh-Gileadites recover the bodies of Saul and his sons, Gustave Doré

==== House of Shallum ====
In the Books of Kings (2 Kings 15:10, 2 Kings 15:13–14) Shallum of Israel's father is identified as Jabesh. However, the passage may instead mention a toponym, identifying that Shallum was "the son" of a city called Jabesh. In this view, Shallum may have originated from Jabesh-Gilead.

=== Later years ===
In his Antiquities of the Jews (c. 93–94 CE), Josephus describes Jabesh Gilead as a metropolis in the Transjordan. In the early-4th century CE, Greek scholar Eusebius mentioned "Iabeis Galaad" in his Onomasticon as a "village beyond the Jordan located on the mountains six miles from the city of Pella on the road to Gerasa."

== Identification ==
The exact location of Jabesh-Gilead is debated. Most scholars identify it with Tell el-Maqlub, but Tell Abu al-Kharaz is also frequently suggested. Both sites were inhabited during the Iron Age and lie along Wadi al-Yabis, a stream believed to preserve the town's ancient name.

== See also ==
- Jabesh
- Gilead

== Sources ==
- Freedman, David Noel; Myers, Allen C. (2000), "Jabesh", Eerdmans Dictionary of the Bible, Amsterdam University Press, ISBN 978-9053565032
- Freedman, David Noel; Myers, Allen C. (2000), "Jabesh-Gilead", Eerdmans Dictionary of the Bible, Amsterdam University Press, ISBN 978-9053565032
