= Peter M. Fischer =

Swedish archaeologist

Peter M. Fischer is an Austrian-Swedish archaeologist. He is a specialist on Eastern Mediterranean and Near Eastern archaeology, and archaeometry. He belongs to the University of Gothenburg (PhD 1980, habilitation 1986) and is associated with the Austrian and Swedish Academies of Sciences. He is the founder and director of the Swedish Jordan Expedition (since 1989), the Palestinian-Swedish Expedition at Tell el-Ajjul, Gaza (co-director Moain Sadeq since 1999). He became the director of the Swedish Cyprus Expedition in 2009 and carried out excavations at Hala Sultan Tekke since 2010. He is member/corresponding member of The Royal Society of Arts and Sciences in Gothenburg, Royal Swedish Academy of Letters, History and Antiquities. and The Austrian Academy of Sciences.

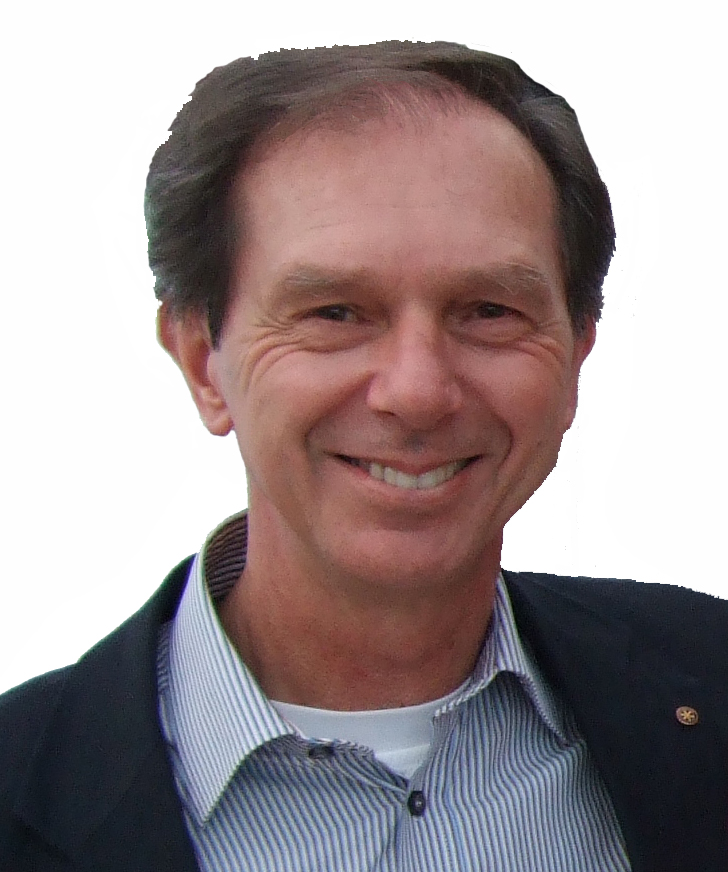
Peter M. Fischer

Peter Fischer conducted excavations at Tell Abu al-Kharaz in the Jordan Valley since 1989 (16 seasons, state 2013) and Hala Sultan Tekke, Cyprus, since 2010 (state 2013).

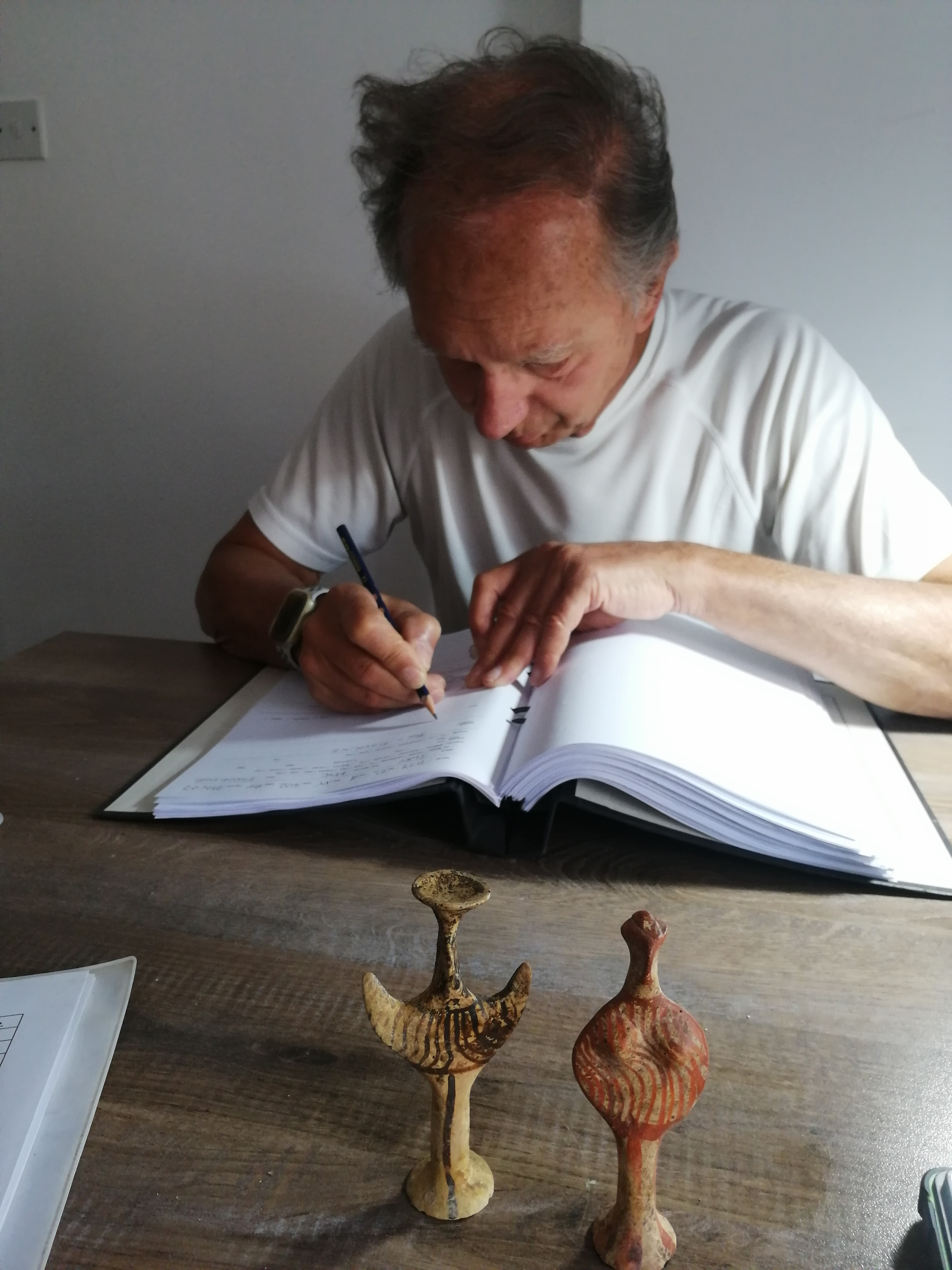
Study of Mycenaean figurines in 2023

== Selected publications ==
=== Monographs (including publication as editor) ===
- Applications of Technical Devices in Archaeology. Studies in Mediterranean Archaeology 75. Gothenburg 1980 (PhD thesis).
- Prehistoric Cypriote Skulls. Studies in Mediterranean Archaeology 75. Gothenburg 1986 (Habil.).
- A Late Bronze to Early Iron Age Tomb at Sahem, Jordan. Abhandlungen des Deutschen Palästina-Vereins 21. Wiesbaden 1997.
- Contributions to the Archaeology and History of the Bronze and Iron Ages in the Eastern Mediterranean. Studies in Honour of Paul Åström, edited by P.M. Fischer, Vienna 2001.
- Tell Abu al-Kharaz in the Jordan Valley. Volume II: The Middle and Late Bronze Ages. Austrian Academy of Sciences Press. Vienna 2006.
- The Chronology of the Jordan Valley during the Middle and Late Bronze Ages: Pella, Tell Abu al-Kharaz and Tell Deir cAlla, edited by P.M. Fischer, contribution by S. Bourke, P.M. Fischer and G. van der Kooij. Austrian Academy of Sciences Press. Vienna 2006.
- Tell Abu al-Kharaz in the Jordan Valley. Volume I: The Early Bronze Age. Austrian Academy of Sciences Press. Vienna 2008.
- Tell Abu al-Kharaz in the Jordan Valley. Volume III: The Iron Age. Austrian Academy of Sciences Press. Vienna 2013.

=== A. Single author ===
- Eine Untersuchung der Kieferfragmente und Zähne aus zwei Gräbern von Trypes bei Dromolaxia, Zypern. Opuscula Atheniensia 13:8, 1980, 139–148.
- The use of a metal detector in archaeology. Opuscula Atheniensia 13:9, 1980, 149–153.
- Geophysical prospecting at Hala Sultan Tekke, Cyprus. Journal of Field Archaeology 7, 4, 1980, 479–484.
- Archaeological prospecting at Hala Sultan Tekke, Cyprus. Symposium onArchaeometry, Naples, Italy, 1983, 41.
- Prospecting at Hala Sultan Tekke – The use of a radio-controlled model aircraft. Praktika B‘ Diethnous Kypriologikou Synedriou, Leukosia 1985, 543–544.
- Cyklopisk mur mätt med Distomaten. Okularet 14, 1985, 5.
- Ett arkeologiskt skelettmaterial - vad har det att säga? Odontologisk Riksstämma, Stockholm, 1985, 20.
- En odontologs odyssé i tid och rum. Göteborgs Tandläkare Sällskap, Årsbok, 1986, 27–31.
- The Cyclopean-built wall of the Mycenaean Citadel of Midea. Journal of Field Archaeology 13, 4, 1986, 499–503.
- Classification of pottery by Micro Colour Analysis. Hydra 5, 1988, 36–41.
- Arkeometri. Humanististik Forskning vid Göteborgs universitet 2: Mycket Mänskligt,1989, 23–27.
- Terrace 1, Trench L: A preliminary report, in P. Åström, K. Demakopoulou, N. Divari-Valaki, P.M. Fischer and G. Walberg: Excavations in Midea 1987. Opuscula Atheniensia 18:1, 1990, 16–19.
- An archaeometric caleidoscope. SAC-News 2, 1990.
- Tell Abu al-Kharaz. The Swedish Jordan Expedition 1989. First season preliminary report from trial soundings. Annual of the Department of Antiquities of Jordan 35, 1991, 67–104.
- Canaanite potteryfrom Hala Sultan Tekke: Analysis with Secondary Ion Mass Spectrometry (SIMS). Bronze Age Trade in the Mediterranean; ed. N.H.Gale. University of Oxford 1989, 1991, 152–161.
- Canaanite pottery from Hala Sultan Tekke: Traditional classification and Micro-Colour analysis. Chapter IX in Cypriot ceramics: Reading the prehistoric record, eds. J.A.Barlow, D.L.Bolger and B.Kling, University Museum of the University of Pennsylvania, Philadelphia 1991, 73–80.
- A possible Late Bronze Age Sanctuary at Tell Abu al-Kharaz, Transjordan. Journal of Prehistoric Religion 5, 1992, 42–47.
- Terrace 1, Trench L: A preliminary report, in P. Åström, K.Demakopoulou, N.Divari-Valakou and P.M. Fischer: Excavations in Midea 1989–1990. Opuscula Atheniensia 19:1, 1992, 15–22.
- Conference Report: Modern Tools in Archaeometry, SAC Symposium, Gothenburg, Sweden, 23–25 May 1991. Review in SAS Bulletin, 14, 4, October–December 1991, Franklin and Marshall College, 12–13; also in SAC-News 4, May1992, 2–4.
- Cypriot finds at Tell Abu al-Kharaz, Transjordan. Acta Cypria. Acts of an international congress on Cypriote archaeology held in Göteborg on 22–24 August 1991. Abstract in Part 1, 20; article in Part 2, 84–90.
- Absolute dating by SIMS - The present state of research. Acts of the Second International Colloquium on Absolute Chronology (The Bronze Age in the Mediterranean). Ägypten und Levante 3, ed. M.Bietak, 1992, 53–56.
- Tell Abu al-Kharaz. The Swedish Jordan Expedition 1991. Second season preliminary excavation report. Annual of the Department of Antiquities of Jordan 37, 1993, 279–305.
- Some Cypriot Pottery Wares analyzed with SIMS. Archaeology and Natural Science 1, 1993, 51–57.
- Tell Abu al-Kharaz, Jordan Valley, in Archaeology of Jordan. American Journal of Archaeology 97, 3, July 1993, 477–478.
- Tell Abu al-Kharaz, Jordan Valley, in Archaeology of Jordan. American Journal of Archaeology 98, 3, July 1994, 536–537.
- The Emergence of Civilization. London 1990. Review of Charles Keith Maisel's book. American Journal of Archaeology 98, 1994, 776–777.
- Tell Abu al-Kharaz. The Swedish Jordan Expedition 1992. Third season preliminary excavation report. Annual of the Department of Antiquities of Jordan 38, 1994, 127–145.
- Silver Statuette of Egyptian Goddess Sekhmet found in Jordan. Minerva. The International Review of Ancient Art and Archaeology, 6, 1, 1995, 3.
- Tell Abual-Kharaz, JordanValley, in Archaeology of Jordan. American Journal of Archaeology 99, 3, 1995, 514–515.
- Tell Abu al-Kharaz. The Swedish Jordan Expedition 1993. Fourth season preliminary excavation report. Annual of the Department of Antiquities of Jordan 39, 1995, 93–119.
- Tell Abu al-Kharaz. The Swedish Jordan Expedition 1994. Fifth season preliminary excavation report. Annual of the Department of Antiquities of Jordan 40, 1996, 101–110.
- Tell Abu al-Kharaz, Jordan Valley, in Archaeology of Jordan. American Journal of Archaeology 100, 3, 1996, 520–521.
- The Mound of the Father of the Beads: Excavating in the Jordan Valley. Minerva 7:5, Sept./Oct.1996, 30–33.
- Svenska Jordanienexpeditionen 1989–1996. Tell Abu al-Kharaz i det bibliska landskapet Gilead. Medusa 17, 3, 1996, 27–34.
- Tell Abou al-Kharaz, la Yabesh biblique? le Monde de la Bible 104, 1997, 25–26; see also: le Monde de la Bible 101, 1996, 47.
- Arkeologisk Expedition i Jordanien. Populär Arkeologi 15, 1, 1997, 35–38.
- Tell Abu al-Kharaz. The Swedish Jordan Expedition 1995 and 1996. Sixth and seventh season preliminary excavation report. Annual of the Department of Antiquities of Jordan 41, 1997, 129–144.
- Tell Abu al-Kharaz: Occupation Throughout the Ages. The Faunal and Botanical Evidence. Studies in the History and Archaeology of Jordan 6, 159–165.
- Tell Abu al-Kharaz, Jordan Valley, in Archaeology of Jordan. American Journal of Archaeology 101, 3, 1997, 508.
- Tell Abu al-Kharaz, Jordan Valley, in Archaeology of Jordan. American Journal of Archaeology 102, 3, 1998, 586–587.
- A Late Bronze to Early Iron Age Tomb at Sahem, Jordan. Near Eastern Archaeology 61, 4, 1998, 255.
- Tell Abu al-Kharaz. The Swedish Jordan Expedition 1997. Eight season preliminary excavation report. Annual of the Department of Antiquities of Jordan 42, Amman 1998, 213–223.
- Chocolate-on-White Ware: Typology, Chronology and Provenance. The Evidence from Tell Abu al-Kharaz, Jordan Valley. Bulletin of the American Schools of Oriental Research 313, 1999, 1-29.
- Tell Abu al-Kharaz, Jordan Valley, and Cyprus: A Study of Bronze Age Interactions. Cypriote Archaeology in Göteborg. Papers presented at a symposium on Cypriote Archaeology Held in Göteborg 20 May 1998, ed. K.H. Niklasson. Jonsered 1999, 41–63.
- Tell Abu al-Kharaz, in Archaeology in Jordan. American Journal of Archaeology 103, 1999, 498.
- The Jordan Valley and Cyprus: Chocolate-on-White and White Slip Wares. Periplus. Festschrift für Hans-Günther Buchholz zu seinem achtzigsten Geburtstag am 24. Dezember 1999, Studies in Mediterranean Archaeology CXXVII. Paul Åströms Förlag 2000, 51–58.
- Analytical Methods: SIMS. Pilot Project based on the Study of Fingerprint Elements of Thera Pumice and from Ice Cores. The Synchronization of Civilizations in the Eastern Mediterranean in the Second Millennium B.C., ed. M. Bietak.Verlag der Österreichischen Akademie der Wissenschaften, Wien 2000, 32–33.
- Regional Project: Jordan. The Synchronization of Civilizations in the Eastern Mediterranean in the Second Millennium B.C., ed. M. Bietak. Verlag der Österreichischen Akademie der Wissenschaften, Wien 2000, 130–135; see also 175–176.
- The Early Bronze Age at Tell Abu al-Kharaz, Jordan Valley: A Study of Pottery Typology and Provenance, Radiocarbon dates, and Synchronism of Palestine and Egypt During Dynasty 0–2. Ceramic and Change in the Early Bronze Age of the Southern Levant, ed. G. Philip and D. Baird, Sheffield Academic Press 2000, 201–232.
- A Synthesis of Ten Campaigns at Tell Abu al-Kharaz, Jordan Valley: The Early, Middle, Late Bronze and Iron Ages. Proceedings of the First International Congress on the Archaeology of the Ancien Near East ICAANE. Rome, May 18–23, 1998, Rome 2000, 447–470.
- White Slip I and II from Tell Abu al-Kharaz, Jordan Valley: Pottery Synchronism and Datings. The White Slip Ware of Late Bronze Age Cyprus, ed. V. Karageorghis. Verlag der Österreichischen Akademie der Wissenschaften, Wien 2001, 161–170.
- Cypriote Bichrome Wheel-made Ware and Base-ring Ware from the New Excavations at Tell el-ʿAjjul: Synchronism and Dating, in The Chronology of Base-ring Ware and Bichrome Wheel-made Ware, ed. P. Åström, The Royal Academy of Letters, History and Antiquities, Stockholm 2001, 221–230.
- Cypriote Finds from the Renewed Excavations at Tell el-ʿAjjul: Statistics and Chronology, in Contributions to the Archaeology and History of the Bronze and Iron Ages in the Eastern Mediterranean. Studies in Honour of Paul Åström, ed. P. M. Fischer, Vienna 2001, 159–170.
- The Iron Age at Tall Abu al-Kharaz, Jordan Valley: The Third Major Period of Occupation. A Preliminary Synthesis. Studies in the History and Archaeology of Jordan VII, Amman 2001, 305–316.
- Egyptian-Transjordanian Interaction during Predynastic and Protodynastic Times: The Evidence from Tell Abu al-Kharaz, Jordan Valley, in Egypt and the Levant. Interrelations from the 4th through the Early 3rd Millennium B.C.E., eds. E.C.M. van den Brink and T. Levy, Leicester University Press, London-New York 2002, 323–333.
- The Preliminary Chronology of Tell el-ʿAjjul: Results of the Renewed Excavations in 1999 and 2000, 263–294, in: Bietak, M. (ed.), The Synchronisation of Civilisations in the Eastern Mediterranean in the Second Millennium B.C., Vol. II. Proceedings of the SCIEM 2000 - EuroConference, Haindorf 2–7 May 2001. Vienna 2003.
- Chocolate-on-White Ware: Further Observations and Radiocarbon Dates. Egypt and the Levant 13, 2003: 51–68.
- Ausgrabungen bei Gaza: der Tell el-Adschul. Eine Grossstadt aus der Bronzezeit, Welt und Umwelt der Bibel. Archäologie, Kunst und Geschichte 31, 2004: 58–59.
- Coast contra Inland: Tell el-ʿAjjul and Tell Abu al-Kharaz during the late Middle and Late Bronze Ages, Levant 14, 2004: 249–263
- The Euro-Mediterranean Archaeology Camp Project at Tell Abu al-Kharaz, Jordan (Results from the Excavations in 2001). Museum for Mediterranean and Near Eastern Antiquities. Focus on the Mediterranean, Stockholm 2005, 117–132.
- Chocolate-on-White Ware from Tell el-Dabca, Egypt, 103–110, in: E. Czerny, I. Hein, H. Hunger, D. Melman and A. Schwab (eds.), Timelines. Studies in Honour of Manfred, OLA 149.1-3, Peeter's Leuven 2006.
- Copper and Bronze Objects from Tell Abu al-Kharaz and Sahem, Jordan: Some Reflections on the Results of Atomic-Absorption Spectrometry, 25–32, in: A.M. Maeir and P. de Miroschedji (eds.), “I will Speak the Riddle of Ancient Times”. Archaeological and Historical Studies in Honor of Amihai Mazar on the Occasion of His Sixtieth Birthday. Festschrift A. Mazar, eds. A. Maeir andP. de Miroschedji. Winona Lake 2006.
- A Note on the Lustrous Wheel-made Wares from Tell el-ʿAjjul, 71–78, in I. Hein (ed.), The Lustrous Wares of LB Cyprus and the Eastern Mediterranean, Vienna, 5th-6th Nov. 2004, Austrian Academy of Sciences Press Vienna 2007.
- Review of Berelov, I.: Occupation and Abandonment of Middle Bronze Age Zahrat adh-Dhrah 1, Jordan: The Behavioural Implications of Quantitative Ceramic Analyses, BAR International Series 1493. Oxford Archaeopress, 2006, 209 pp.: in BASOR 348 (2007):92-94.
- The "Jebusite" BurialPlace in Jerusalem: Chocolate-on-White Ware and Chronology, 200–211, in: Z. Kafafi and R. Schick (eds.), Jerusalem before the Islam, BAR International Series 1699 (2007)
- A Middle Bronze Age III Jug from the Lebanese Coast at Tell Abu al-Kharaz, Jordan Valley, 87–91, in: M. Bietak and E. Czerny (eds.), Studies on the Archaeology and Chronology of Lebanon, Syria and Egypt, Vienna 2008.
- Tell Abu al-Kharaz: A Bead in the Jordan Valley. Near Eastern Archaeology 71:4, Dec. 2008, 196–213.

=== B. Co-author ===
- P.M. Fischer, J.G. Norén, A.R.E. Lodding and H. Odelius. Quantitative Secondary Ion Mass Spectrometry (SIMS) of prehistoric teeth. SIMS 5, Springer: Berlin-New York 1985, 438–442.
- P.M. Fischer and A.R.E. Lodding. SIMS studies of teeth: a new dating technique? Acts of an International Colloquium on absolute Chronology held at the University of Gothenburg 20–22 August 1987, Part 1, Gothenburg 1987, 118, and Part 3, Gothenburg 1989, 142–149.
- P. Åström and P.M. Fischer. Metal-detecting in Cyprus and Greece. Antiquity 61, 1987, 266–267.
- P.M. Fischer and J.G. Norén. Enamel defects in teeth from a prehistoric Cypriot population. OSSA 13, 1988, 87–96.
- P.M. Fischer, E.U. Engström and A.R.E. Lodding. Archaeometric applications of SIMS. The 2nd Chalmers Postgraduate Conference on Materials Science, Göteborg 1988.
- P.M. Fischer, A.R.E. Loddingand J.G. Norén. Trace element and dating studies of teeth by Secondary Ion Mass Spectrometry (SIMS). Archaeometry, ed. Y.Maniatis, Elsevier: Amsterdam-Oxford-New York-Tokyo 1989, 109–119.
- P.M. Fischer, E.U. Engström and A.R.E. Lodding. Recent applications of secondary ion mass spectrometry in archaeology. Archaeometry, Abstracts. Heidelberg 1990.
- A.R.E. Lodding, P.M. Fischer, H. Odelius, J.G.Norén, L. Sennerby, C.B. Johansson, J.M. Chabala and R. Levi-Setti. Secondary ion mass spectrometry in the study of biomineralizations and biomaterials. Analytica Chimica Acta 1990, 299–314.
- P.M. Fischer and E. Toivonen-Skage. Metallic Burnished Early Bronze Age Ware from Tell Abu al-Kharaz. Studies in the History and Archaeology of Jordan 5, 1995, 587–596.
- P.M. Fischer and G. Herrmann. A carved bone object from Tell Abu al-Kharaz in Jordan: A Palestinian workshop for bone and ivory? Levant 27, 1995, 145–164.
- P.M. Fischer and O. Keel. The Saham tomb: The scarabs. Zeitschrift des Deutschen Palästina-Vereins, 111, 2, 1995, 26–32.
- E.M. Stermer, S. Risnes and P.M. Fischer. Trace Element Analysis of Blackish Staining on the Crowns of Human Archaeological Teeth. In E.M. Stermer Dental Aspects of a Medieval Norwegian Skeletal Material (Diss., University of Oslo 1996)
- P.M. Fischer and R. Feldbacher. MontAjjul – A Picture Database, Proceedings of Workshop 10 on Archaeology and Computer, Stadtarchäologie, Vienna 2006 (published as CD).
