= Shobi =

- King of Ammon
- Reign: c. 980s–950s BCE
- Predecessor: Hanun
- Successor: Unknown
- Born: c. late 11th BCE
- Father: Nahash

Shobi ben Nahash was the son of King Nahash of Ammon and brother of his predecessor Hanun. When Hanun was deposed by the Israelites under King David, Shobi was made king of Ammon in Hanun's place and became a loyal vassal of David's. See 2 Samuel 17:27, I Chronicles 19.
