= Tell el-Maqlub =

Archeological site in Jordan

Tel Maqlub
- تل ٱلْمقلوب (Arabic)
- Location within Jordan
- 32.402370°N 35.6823°E
- Type: Settlement
- Location: Ajloun Governorate, Jordan

Site notes
- Condition: In ruins
- Public access: Yes

Tell el-Maqlub ('Over-turned mound') is an archaeological site in Ajloun Governorate, Jordan. It is dated to the Bronze and Iron Ages.

== Location ==
Tell el-Maqlub is situated atop of a hill overlooking a bend in Wadi Yabis, in a region known in biblical times as Gilead. It is located 35 km from the Sea of Galilee, 75 km from the Mediterranean Sea, 11 km east of the Jordan River, 3 km northeast of Halawah, and 20 km south-southwest of Beit She'an, Israel.

== Biblical identification ==
Tell el-Maqlub is commonly identified with biblical town of Jabesh Gilead. This identification is thought to be in accordance with the account of Eusebius, who described "Iabeis Galaad" in the 4th century CE as a "village beyond the Jordan located on the mountains six miles from the city of Pella on the road to Gerasa."

Some biblical scholars, including Nelson Gluck, preferred to place Jabesh-Gilead in Tell Abu el-Kharaz, located further east along the Wadi Yabis. This identification is based on the account given in Book of Samuel, which mentions Jabesh as being a night's march away from Beit She'an.

== Findings ==
Tell el-Maqlub was once surrounded by a massive defensive wall, parts of it are still visible today. Potsherds from the Early Bronze Age (I-II), Middle Bronze Age (I-IIA), Iron Age (I-II) and Roman-Byzantine periods were found here.

Based on archeological surveys conducted at the site, Tell el-Maqlub was a large, fortified town during the Iron Age, and when the nearby hills were first terraced for agriculture.
