= Gershon Galil =

Israeli Biblical Hebrew epigrapher

Gershon Galil (Hebrew: גרשון גליל) is Professor of Biblical Studies and Ancient History and former chair of the Department of Jewish History at the University of Haifa.

Gershon Galil earned his doctorate from the Hebrew University in Jerusalem. His work, The Chronology of the Kings of Israel and Judah, suggests a new chronology for the kings of ancient Israel and ancient Judah. His thesis was published by Brill Academic Publishers in 1996 and his chronology contrasts with those presented by the more traditional William F. Albright and Edwin R. Thiele.

Galil's studies of ancient Near Eastern culture and history include Israel and Assyria (Hebrew; Zmora-Bitan, 2001); The Lower Stratum Families in the Neo-Assyrian Period (BRILL, 2007) and more. He also co-edited two volumes of the Supplement to Vetus Testamentum: Studies in Historical Geography and Biblical Historiography presented to Zecharia Kallai (with M. Weinfeld, Brill, 2000); and Homeland and Exile: Biblical and Ancient Near Eastern Studies in Honour of Bustenay Oded (with M. Geller and A. Millard, Brill, 2009).

In recent years, Galil has garnered significant media attention for a series of high-profile but controversial claims regarding early Hebrew inscriptions. These include his interpretation of the so-called Mount Ebal Curse Tablet - a lead sheet allegedly dating to the Late Bronze Age, discovered at the site popularly known as Joshua's Altar and reportedly removed under controversial circumstances from Palestinian controlled Area B of the West Bank - as containing the earliest known Hebrew text, a claim widely disputed by epigraphers and archaeologists. He also co-announced multiple alleged inscriptions in the Siloam Tunnel, which he argued provide new insights into the reign of Hezekiah and the chronology of biblical events, though these too were met with skepticism, as Galil has been the only scholar to identify these inscriptions. In 2024, Galil and collaborators presented what they described as a "Jerusalem curse tablet," again publicized via press release rather than peer-reviewed publication. While these announcements received broad coverage in the popular media, they have generally not been accepted by the mainstream scholarly community, which has raised concerns over methodology, dating, and the lack of formal academic scrutiny prior to public dissemination.

== See also ==
- Khirbet Qeiyafa
