= Manasseh Hill Country Survey =

Archaeological survey in Israel and the West Bank

The Manasseh Hill Country Survey is an archaeological survey of the Manasseh Hill Country, a region in Israel and the West Bank associated with the territory of the biblical Israelite tribe of Manasseh. It began in 1978 under the direction of Israeli archaeologist Adam Zertal, and continues for over 40 years. Archaeologist Israel Finkelstein described the survey as "one of the most important ever undertaken in the Land of Israel."

The survey covered an area of more than 2,500 square kilometers, from the Jordan Valley in the East to the Israeli coastal plain in the West, and from Nahal Iron in the North to the north-eastern point of the Dead Sea in the South. It unearthed over 200 Iron Age I sites covering the area's settlement from 1250 to 1000 BCE. Among the sites discovered during the survey were the Mount Ebal Site (1980) and Ahwat (1992).

The survey's findings were published in seven volumes, originally in 1992 in Hebrew, with an English edition first published in 2000.

== Publications ==
The findings of the Manasseh Hill Country Survey are being published, the last one, as of May 2026, being Volume 9, which came out in English in 2026. The volumes cover the following areas:

- Volume 1: The area of ancient Shechem and Samaria. Author: Adam Zertal.
- Volume 2: The Eastern Valleys and the Fringes of the Desert. Author: Adam Zertal.
- Volume 3: North-western Samaria in Israel/Palestine, from Nahal Iron to Nahal Shechem. Authors: Adam Zertal and Nivi Mirkam.
- Volume 4: The north-eastern region of Samaria, mainly the northern area of the Jordan Valley from Nahal Bezeq to the Sartaba. Authors: Adam Zertal and Shay Bar.
- Volume 5: The eastern region of Samaria, mainly the Middle Jordan Valley, from Wadi Fasael to Wadi Auja, within the territory of Israel/Palestine. Authors: Shay Bar and Adam Zertal.
- Volume 6: The Eastern Samaria Shoulder, from Nahal Tirzah (Wadi Far'ah) to Ma'ale Efrayim Junction within the territory of Israel/Palestine. Authors: Shay Bar and Adam Zertal.
- Volume 7: The South-Eastern Samaria Shoulder, from Wadi Rashash to Wadi Auja within the territory of Israel/Palestine. Authors: Shay Bar and Adam Zertal.
- Volume 8: The Slopes of Western Samaria (from Nahal Shechem to Wadi Zir), published 2020 in Hebrew. Authors: Shay Bar and Adam Zertal.
- Volume 9: The Jordan Valley and Eastern Samaria from Wadi 'Aujah to Wadi Makuk (2026). Authors: Shay Bar and Adam Zertal.
