= Nahash of Ammon =

Biblical king of Ammon

Nahash
- King of Ammon
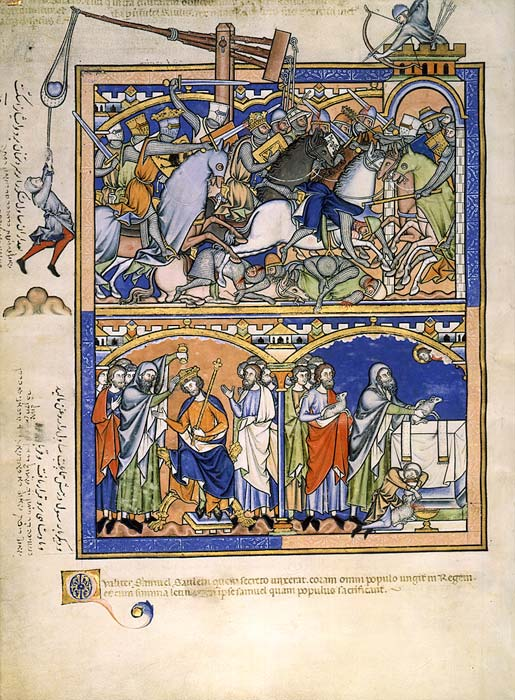
- Saul slaying Nahash and the Ammonites (top) Samuel anointing Saul and Saul sacrificing to the Lord (bottom), from the Morgan Bible.
- Reign: c. 1030/1020s–1000/990s BCE
- Predecessor: Unknown
- Successor: Hanun
- Born: c. mid 11th BCE
- Issue: Hanun; Shobi

Nahash was the name of a king of Ammon, mentioned in the Books of Samuel and Chronicles in the Hebrew Bible.

Nahash appears abruptly as the attacker of Jabesh-Gilead, which lay outside the territory he laid claim to. Having subjected the occupants to a siege, the population sought terms for surrender, and were told by Nahash that they had a choice of death (by the sword) or having their right eyes gouged out. The population obtained seven days' grace from Nahash, during which they would be allowed to seek help from the Israelites, after which they would have to submit to the terms of surrender. The occupants sought help from the people of Israel, sending messengers throughout the whole territory, and Saul, a herdsman at this time, responded by raising an army which decisively defeated Nahash and his cohorts at Bezek.

The strangely cruel terms given by Nahash for surrender were explained by Josephus as being the usual practice of Nahash. A more complete explanation came to light with the discovery of the Dead Sea Scrolls: although not present in either the Septuagint or Masoretic Text, an introductory passage, preceding this narrative, was found in a copy of the Books of Samuel among the scrolls found in cave 4:

[N]ahash, king of Ammonites would put hard pressure on the descendants of Gad and the descendants of Ruben and would gouge everyone’s right eye out, but no res(cuer) would be provided for Israel and there was not left anyone among the children of Israel in the Tr(ans Jordan) whose right eye Nahash the king of Ammonites did not gouge out but be(hold) seven thousand men (escaped the power of) Ammonites and they arrived at (Ya)besh Gilead. About a month later Nahash the Ammonite went up and besieged Jabesh-Gilead.

In other words, Nahash had conquered the tribal lands of Gad and Reuben, and a portion of the population had fled from him to Jabesh-Gilead, which is why he laid siege to it.

Nothing more is told about Nahash in the Books of Samuel until his death, at the start of the reign of David, is mentioned. At this point, the narrative states that David sent a message of condolence to Hanun, the heir of Nahash, because Nahash had shown kindness to David. There is a tradition that when David had earlier entrusted his family to the King of Moab (cf. 1 Samuel 22:3–4) the latter slew the entire family, except for one of David's brothers who had escaped and found asylum with Nahash. Jerome suggested that David's sympathy was because both he and Nahash were enemies of Saul. However, Josephus claimed that Nahash was slain when the Ammonites were defeated by Saul, which would, if true, make the Nahash whose death David lamented a different person; it is unclear on what basis Josephus (who lived some 900 years later) makes his claim.

There is also a man named Nahash who is described by 2 Samuel 17:27–29 as the father of Shobi, a man who aided David against Absalom. The Jewish Encyclopedia argues that the father of Abigail, the king of the Ammonites, and the father of Shobi, were the same individual, hence making Shobi, Hanun, and David, half-brothers. In consequence of this view, it would seem that Shobi shared his father's positive view of David, while Hanun, Shobi's brother and David's half-brother saw David as an enemy. However some rabbis argued that Shobi was in fact Hanun; in this argument Hanun must have fallen out with David when they both took control of their respective thrones. Wellhausen on the other hand believed that 2 Samuel 17:25 originally named Jesse as the father of Abigail, and the current mention there of Nahash (נחש) is a typographic error caused by the brevity of the letters for Jesse (ישי) and the presence in verse 27 of the name Nahash.

Etymology

In the Hebrew Bible, נחש (nakhash), first appears in Genesis 3:1 - often translated as serpent. In certain instances, נחש may be translated as serpent or snake in noun form, as divination in verb form, or shiny metal (like copper or bronze) in noun form.

Nature, character, and associations develop throughout the progression of the Hebrew Bible with נחש. Beginning in the Garden of Eden as a deceiving serpent, the concept of divination and a brazen, shining figure are also possible in the translation exercise. If viewing Genesis 1:14-19 as it relates to ancient cosmology, the Genesis 3:1 serpent may be seen as a shining heavenly being too. A more complete picture may be drawn of a serpent figure, brazen and shining in appearance, deceiving Eve with his access of heavenly knowledge.

Nahash, king of Ammon, would by ancient standards have access to the knowledge of the gods - a diviner - and he also would have associations with a brazen, shining appearance when dressed as king. In his introduction in the story of 1 Samuel 11, an ancient reader may have thematically viewed Nahash through the lens of the deceptive serpent that preceded him.

In the context of 1 Samuel 11, Saul appears as one who defeats the serpent, Nahash. The statement in Genesis 3:15, regarding the crushing of the serpent's head by the seed of the woman, finds partial fulfillment in the actions of the first king of Israel. [ref. Dr. Michael S. Heiser].
