= Mount Ebal site =

Archaeological site in the West Bank

Mount Ebal Site
- Mount Ebal Altar; Iron Age structure on Mount Ebal
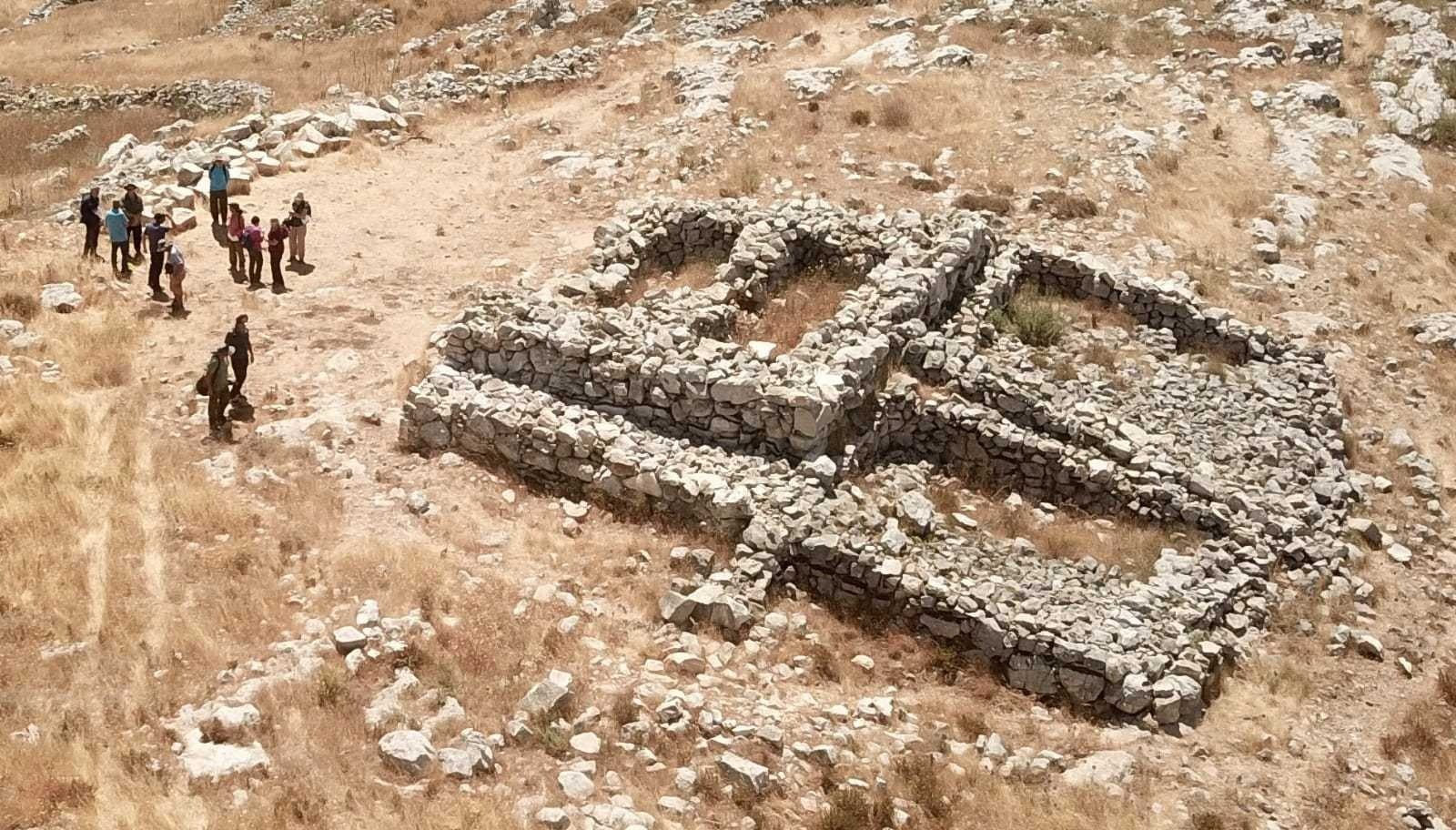
- Aerial photo

- Location within the West Bank
- 32.23946°N 35.287396°E
- Type: cultic site
- Periods: Iron Age I
- Cultures: Israelite
- Location: West Bank
- Region: Mount Ebal

Site notes
- Material: fieldstones
- Height: 785 m (2,575 ft)
- Excavation dates: 1982–1989
- Archaeologists: Adam Zertal; University of Haifa and the Israel Exploration Society
- Discovered: 1980
- Condition: In ruins
- Public access: Limited

The Iron Age I Structure on Mt. Ebal, also known as the Mount Ebal site, Mount Ebal's Altar, and Joshua's Altar, is an archeological site dated to the Iron Age I, located on Mount Ebal, West Bank.

The Mount Ebal site was discovered by Israeli archaeologist Adam Zertal during the Manasseh Hill Country Survey in 1980. Zertal, who later excavated the site for eight seasons, suggested to identify it as Joshua's altar as featured in the Book of Joshua of the Hebrew Bible (Old Testament). This identification was fiercely debated during the 1980s. Today, many archeologists agree that the structure was a site of an early Israelite cultic activity; however, its identification with Joshua's altar is disputed.

The site and its possible archaeological significance in Jewish history became a political issue in 2021 after a portion of the site was damaged by municipal workers of the Palestinian Authority. This followed zoning changes that placed it under Palestinian jurisdiction. The damage to the site in turn promoted calls from the Israeli right to transform the site, which is currently not marked on maps as being of archaeological significance, into an archaeological park.

== Location ==
The Mount Ebal site is situated on the northeastern spur of Mount Ebal, a place known as Northern el-Burnat. It is located a few kilometers east of Asira ash-Shamaliya, northeast of Nablus and north of Tell Balata (biblical Shechem).

== Archeological findings ==
The Mount Ebal structure was found by Adam Zertal in 1980, within a naturally shaped amphitheatre. Excavations, conducted by the University of Haifa and the Israel Exploration Society, lasted eight seasons between 1982 and 1989.

Upon archaeological investigation, several potsherds were found among this heap, and were dated to 1220–1000 BC, a date for which no other remains are found nearby, and so a more substantial archaeological excavation was launched at the site in 1987.

The excavation found a large walled structure, seemingly built direct into the bedrock without a doorway or floor, and had been infilled by layers of stone, ash, and earth; on the southwest, two paved areas were found, split apart by a further wide wall higher at one end than the other and with a surrounding oval wall. Slowly burnt bones were found at the site, and after analysis were discovered to originate from bullocks, goats, and fallow deer.

=== Main structure ===
The upper part of the building was paved with medium-sized fieldstones. A small semicircular stone structure that provided shelter for shepherds in Samaria on rainy days was built on this pavement. Beneath it, were the remains of an Ottoman observation post from the First World War.

During the first phase of the excavation, the stone pile was "peeled off," and below it, a 9 by 7-meter-long structure was discovered, adjacent to which were two paved stone courtyards, separated by a sloping wall (ramp) that rose to the top of the building. The entire structure and walls were built of fieldstones. The building rose to a height of about 4 meters, and was paved with fieldstones. No entrance to the building was discovered. The walls of the building were 1.4 meters wide. The interior of the building was filled with layers of ash and stones. Out of the outer frame of the building came two walls that did not meet towards its center. The walls were also submerged in layers of ash and stone.

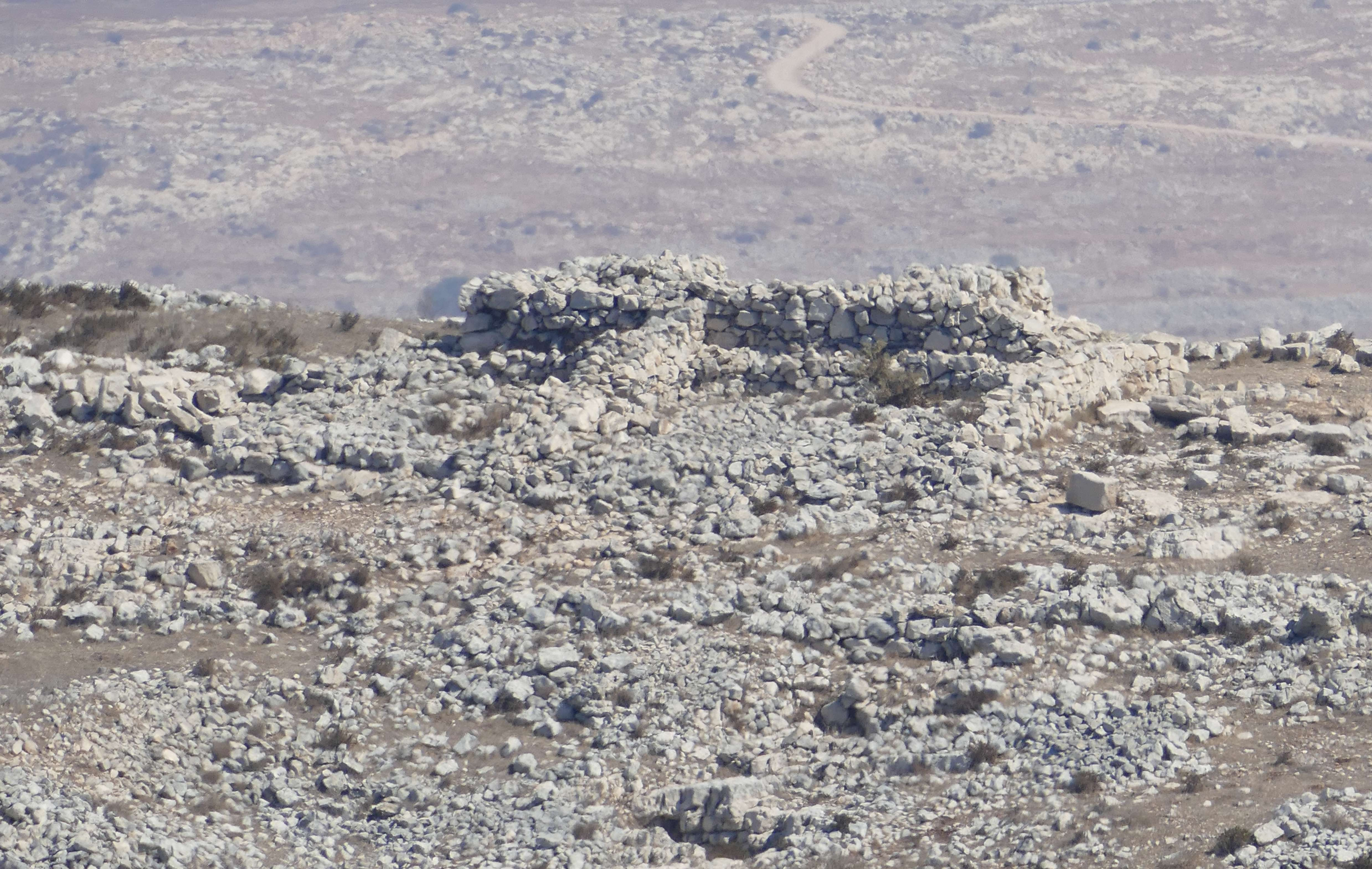
Front view of the structure

The structure was filled with layers of stone and ash. The ash layer was about 1.5 meters thick and clean ash, which included a large amount of bone ash.

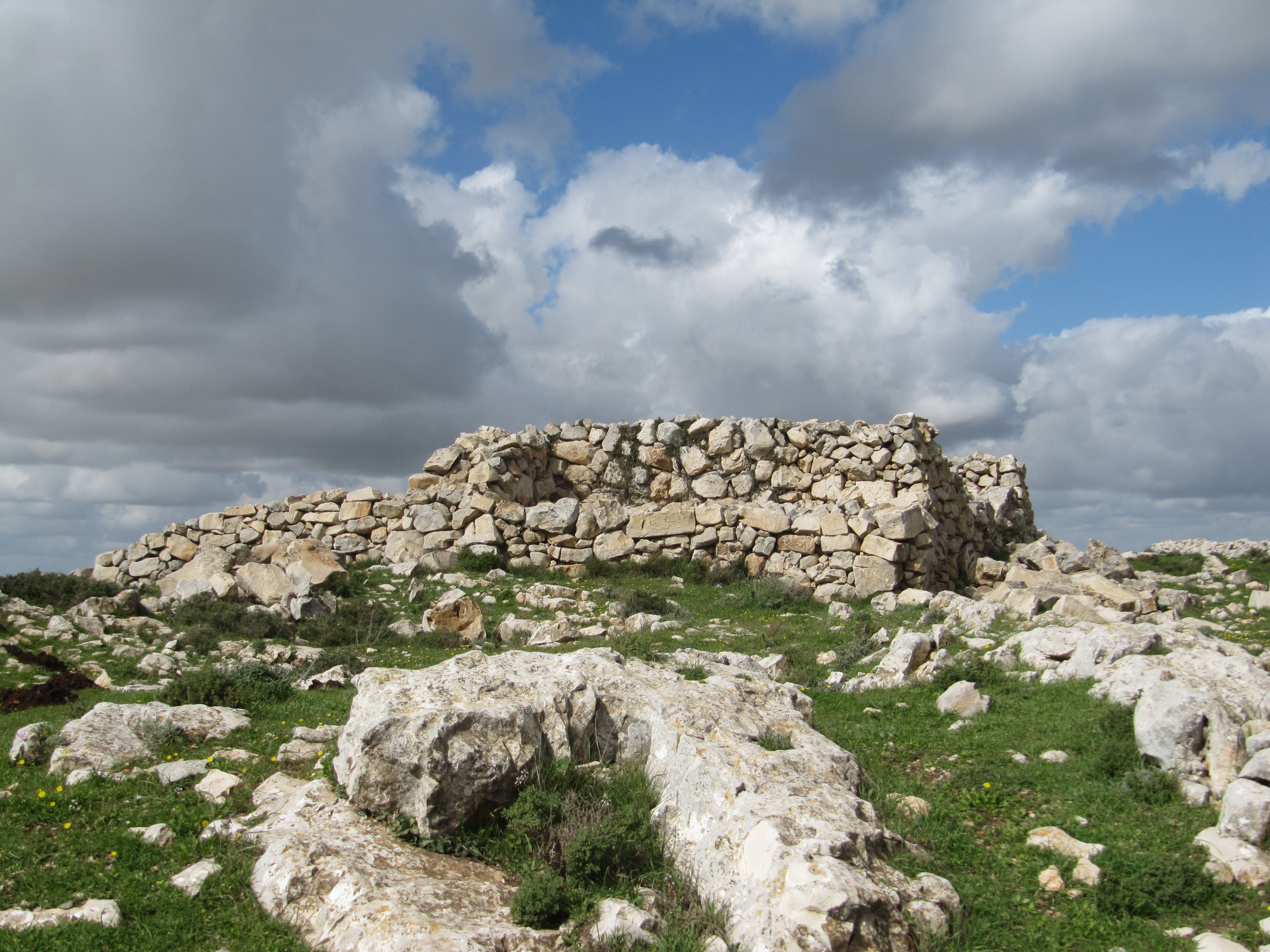
Side view

=== Other findings ===
Pottery fragments from the Iron Age I, whole pottery vessels from that period, pieces of peeled plaster, worship vessels including incense vessels, thousands of kosher animal bones, fate cubes, two Egyptian scarabs and two earrings were discovered at the site. Baruch Brandl dated the scarabs to the last quarter of the 13th century BC, the time of Ramesses II. One scarab contains an ornament reminiscent of a Hyksos style and the other is engraved in a cartouche with the name of Thutmose III, which dates back to the 15th century BC, and according to the researcher, it is a memorial scarab issued by Ramesses II in memory of Thutmose.

A trapezoidal stone seal dating to the end of the Late Bronze Age was also discovered at the site. The seal was engraved with lines and dots in a style that was also revealed on the handles of the pottery vessels that were brought as votives. These were manufacturer's marks. Trade-marks are common in pottery. The trapezoid was by its unusual nature without parallels. It showed common dot and line patterns for the period or a bit earlier, but the number of them on a number of faces was remarkable, like a multiple domino or unusual die.

== Interpretation ==
=== Zertal's hypothesis ===
The excavating archaeologist, Adam Zertal, believed that the site was the compound containing the biblical altar built by Joshua. According to the Book of Joshua chapter 8, the Israelites under the leadership of Joshua had built an altar on Mount Ebal, as had been instructed earlier by Moses. During the ceremony that followed, Joshua renewed the covenant between Yahweh and the Israelites enacted on Mount Sinai. According to Zertal, it is possible to identify the structure as an altar, because it closely matches the biblical and Mishnaic descriptions of altars.

The filled walled structure being the altar itself – the filling being a part of the altar rather than debris (and indicative of an Assyrian style altar, like that specified in the Book of Exodus as being hollow with boards) – and the wall between the two courtyards being a ramp (in accordance with the no steps instruction in Exodus), most other archaeologists believe it to be something else.

Fallow deer bones were also found at the site. These bones make up 28% of all finds and were discovered only in the filling of the altar itself. The fallow deer appears in the Bible in the list of kosher animals for food (Deuteronomy 14: 4–7), but not in the list of sacrificial animals. According to Benjamin Mazar, it is possible that the fallow deer was used as a sacrificial animal in the 12th century BCE, a period in which a transition from semi-nomadic to permanent agriculture took place. Another possibility is that these animals were used only for feeding the participants in the worship, and their bones were later brought as a sacrificial offering to fill the stone altar with the remains of sacred food. The site also contained remains of a hedgehog and a wild rabbit, but later investigation revealed these animals probably reached the site after it had been abandoned.

==== Reception of the theory ====
There are several issues with the association with Joshua's altar that stand in opposition to Zertal's theory. One is that the site is located on the north side of the mountain, and not the south side facing Mount Gerizim, making a curse and blessing ritual held there and on Gerizim somewhat difficult to hold antiphonally. Zertal proposed that this could be resolved by identifying a mountain to the north as Gerizim rather than the usual location, though the suggestion has been rejected by both the Samaritan community and by other scholars and archaeologists.

Israel Finkelstein claimed that "it is clear that the description of the construction of the Mount Ebal altar by Joshua reflects a later reality—and historically it is difficult to accept that there was a central worship site of the early Israelites at such an early date as Zertal suggested." To strengthen his claim, Finkelstein added that the identification is uncertain because "there are considerable difficulties in identifying the main structure as an altar: the difference between this structure and other Israelite altars"; However, Finkelstein believes that this is indeed a ritual site. Benjamin Mazar was also of the opinion that this was a ritual site. Nadav Ne'eman suggested identifying the site with the ritual site of Shechem during the early Iron Age.

Zertal hit back at Finkelstein's critique, arguing that it stemmed from his preconceived rejection of the historicity of the Bible, and that it ignored findings he presented in his 1985 study that there were different stages during the site's development. Zertal further noted that the enormous amount of ritual vessels that were found at the site could not be ignored, and that while the ritual vessels were mostly inside the altar and clearly stored, the rest of the vessels were mostly around it, and Zertal estimated the participants were served at the sacrificial rite. Among these vessels are also collar lip jars that contained drinking water. Zvi Gal has also defended the identification of the Mount Ebal site as an altar and responded to challenges to it.

Overall, there is no clear archaeological consensus for the identification of the site as an altar that was associated with Joshua, though many archeologists agree that the structure was a site of an early Israelite cultic activity of some kind.

=== Watchtower theory ===
Aharon Kempinski claimed the site was an Iron Age I watchtower. He argued that it was part of a village, which was inhabited in three stages; a semi-nomadic stage with peasants living in tents or huts with few remains left, the beginning of a permanent settlement which was destroyed, and lastly the building of a guard tower, identified as an altar by Zertal.

Zertal rejected Kempinski's three-stage model, claiming that it contradicted much of the findings on the ground. He wrote that "Kempinski has not the slightest idea of what has been found in those four seasons, since he never asked, nor came again to the site. His criticisms are based solely on a single, early visit". Zertal argued that there were only two stages, no evidence of semi-nomad settlement, the building had no entrance and could not be a house, and no signs of destruction or need for a watchtower.

== Access ==
Israelis wishing to visit the site today must coordinate their activity with COGAT, the Israeli Defense Ministry unit which manages civilian affairs for Palestinians in the West Bank and liaises with Gaza, since Mount Ebal is located in what is now designated as Area B. In addition, Israeli citizens visiting the area are required to be escorted by IDF soldiers, to ensure their personal safety. The Shomron Regional Council, as of July 2016, was trying to promote the area as a tourist destination.

== Damage and politicization ==
In February 2021, a portion of the site was destroyed by municipal workers acting on behalf of the Palestinian Authority who removed stones making up part of the wall on one side of the archaeological site in order to pave a nearby road. The incident followed zoning changes that placed the site in Area B under Palestinian jurisdiction, where previously the site had been in Area C under Israeli jurisdiction.

The damage to the site in turn promoted calls from the figures from the right wing of the Israeli political spectrum to transform the site, which is currently not even marked on maps as being of archaeological significance, into an archaeological park. Political figures that have weighed in on the matter include Likud MK Uzi Dayan, Yossi Dagan and Tzvi Hauser.

== See also ==
- Archaeology of Israel
- Biblical archaeology
- Israelite highland settlement
- Mount Ebal lead object
