= Robert D. Miller =

Religious scholar and Old Testament theologian

Robert Donald Miller II
- Born: August 21, 1966; Apple Creek, Ohio, US
- Died: November 22, 2023 (aged 57)
- Occupations: Biblical Scholar, Archaeologist, and Professor
- Board member of: Chairperson, Board of Control of the New American Bible for the United States Conference of Catholic Bishops; Member, Board of Trustees of the American Schools of Oriental Research
- Spouse: Anne-Marie Duffy Miller
- Children: 4

Academic background
- Education: Kent State University, University of Michigan
- Alma mater: University of Michigan (Ph.D.)
- Thesis: A Social History of Highland Israel in the 12th and 11th Centuries BCE (1998)
- Doctoral advisor: Brian B. Schmidt

Academic work
- Discipline: Old Testament, History of Ancient Israel, Biblical Theology, Syro-Palestinian Archaeology
- Institutions: West Virginia University, Mount St. Mary's Seminary, Catholic University of America, University of Pretoria, St John's College, Cambridge

Robert Donald Miller II OFS (August 21, 1966 – November 22, 2023) was an Old Testament theologian and biblical archaeologist at The Catholic University of America in Washington, D.C. He was also known for his Great Courses series Understanding the Old Testament. "Chieftains of the Highland Clans: A History of Israel in the Twelfth and Eleventh Centuries B.C.", published in 2005, is cited as among his best-known works.

== Early life and education ==
Robert D. Miller II was originally from Apple Creek, Ohio. Miller obtained his B.A. in Old World Archaeology from Kent State University (1988), and both his M.A. and Ph.D. in Biblical and Near Eastern Studies from the University of Michigan (1991/1998). Miller studied Hebrew Bible under Peter Machinist and Brian B. Schmidt and Archaeology under Henry T. Wright. In 1986 Miller converted to Catholicism, and in June 1998 professed to the Secular Franciscan Order.

== Career ==
After graduate school, Miller began teaching as an assistant professor of Religious Studies at the West Virginia University Program for Religious Studies from 1998 to 1999. From 1999 to 2008, he taught as an Assistant (1999–2004), later Associate (2004–2008), Professor of Scripture at Mount St. Mary's Seminary. In 2008, Miller began teaching at The Catholic University of America as an Associate (2008–2018), later Ordinary (2018-present), Professor of Old Testament, receiving tenure in 2012. Miller was appointed Associate Dean of Graduate Studies for the School of Theology in 2017, serving until 2022. Additionally, Miller was Affiliated Faculty at the University of Pretoria and a Life Member of St John's College, Cambridge.

Miller was a scholar of the history, literature, religion, and archaeology of Ancient Israel in the First Temple Period. Miller was also greatly interested in Biblical Theology, having organized several conferences on the subject, and published Syriac and Antiochian Exegesis and Biblical Theology for the 3rd Millennium (2008), Covenant and Grace in the Old Testament: Assyrian Propaganda and Israelite Faith (2012), Between Israelite Religion and Biblical Theology: Essays on Archaeology, History, and Hermeneutics (2016), and Many Roads Lead East: Overtures to Catholic Biblical Theology (2016).

Miller also worked at the interface of science and theology as a recipient of two major grants, Religion and Science in Pastoral Ministry and Science for Seminarians. Interested in the education of the Old Testament and the general public, Miller appeared in a number of media settings including, National Geographic "The Ten Plagues of the Bible", The Associated Press "NOT REAL NEWS: A look at what didn't happen this week", and Aleteia "What is the best edition of the Bible for Catholics?". Miller was a former member of the Board of Trustees of the American Schools of Oriental Research and serves as chair of the Board of Control of the New American Bible for the United States Conference of Catholic Bishops.

== Personal life ==
Miller was married in 1990 to Anne-Marie Duffy Miller; they had four sons. In off hours, Miller performed with historian Jonathan C. Friedman in an electronic folk duo named "Sirocco."

Miller died on November 22, 2023, from recurrent cancer.

== Publications ==
Among the publications by Miller are the following:

- Oral Law in Ancient Israel. Coniectanea Biblica 48. Lanham, MD: Fortress Academics, 2022.
- Wilderness as Metaphor for God in the Hebrew Bible. Brighton, UK: Sussex Academic Press, 2022.
- Yahweh: Origins of the Desert God. Forschungen zur Religion und Literatur des Alten und Neuen Testaments 284. Göttingen: Vandenhoeck & Ruprecht, 2021.
- The Oral World of the Old Testament: A Historical Preview. Biblical Hermeneutics Rediscovered 46. New Delhi: Christian World Imprints, 2021.
- Baal, St. George, and Khidr. History, Archaeology, and Culture of the Levant 8; State College, PA: Eisenbrauns, 2019.
- The Dragon, the Mountain, and the Nations: An Old Testament Myth, Its Origins and Afterlives. Explorations in Ancient Near Eastern Civilizations 6. Winona Lake: Eisenbrauns, 2018.
- Many Roads Lead East: Overtures to Catholic Biblical Theology. Eugene: Cascade, 2016.
- Between Israelite Religion and Biblical Theology: Essays on Archaeology, History, and Hermeneutics (Contributions to Biblical Exegesis and Theology 80; Leuven: Peeters, 2016).
- The Highest Form of Wisdom: A Memorial Book in Honor of Professor Saul S. Friedman (1937-2013), ed. J. C. Friedman and R. D. Miller II. New York: Ktav, 2015.
- Covenant and Grace in the Old Testament: Assyrian Propaganda and Israelite Faith. Perspectives on Hebrew Scriptures and its Contexts 16; Piscataway: Gorgias, 2012.
- The Psalms as Israel's Prayer and Our Own. Christian Heritage Rediscovered 2; New Delhi: Christian World Imprints, 2013.
- Oral Tradition in Ancient Israel. Biblical Performance Criticism 4; Eugene: Cascade, 2011.
- Syriac and Antiochian Exegesis and Biblical Theology for the 3rd Millennium. Gorgias Eastern Christian Studies 6; Piscataway: Gorgias, 2008.
- Chieftains of the Highland Clans: A History of Israel in the 12th and 11th Centuries bc. The Bible in Its World 1; Grand Rapids: Eerdmans, 2005; Repr. Wipf & Stock, 2012.
