= Samaria (ancient city) =

Capital of the northern Kingdom of Israel

- שֹׁמְרוֹן (Hebrew)
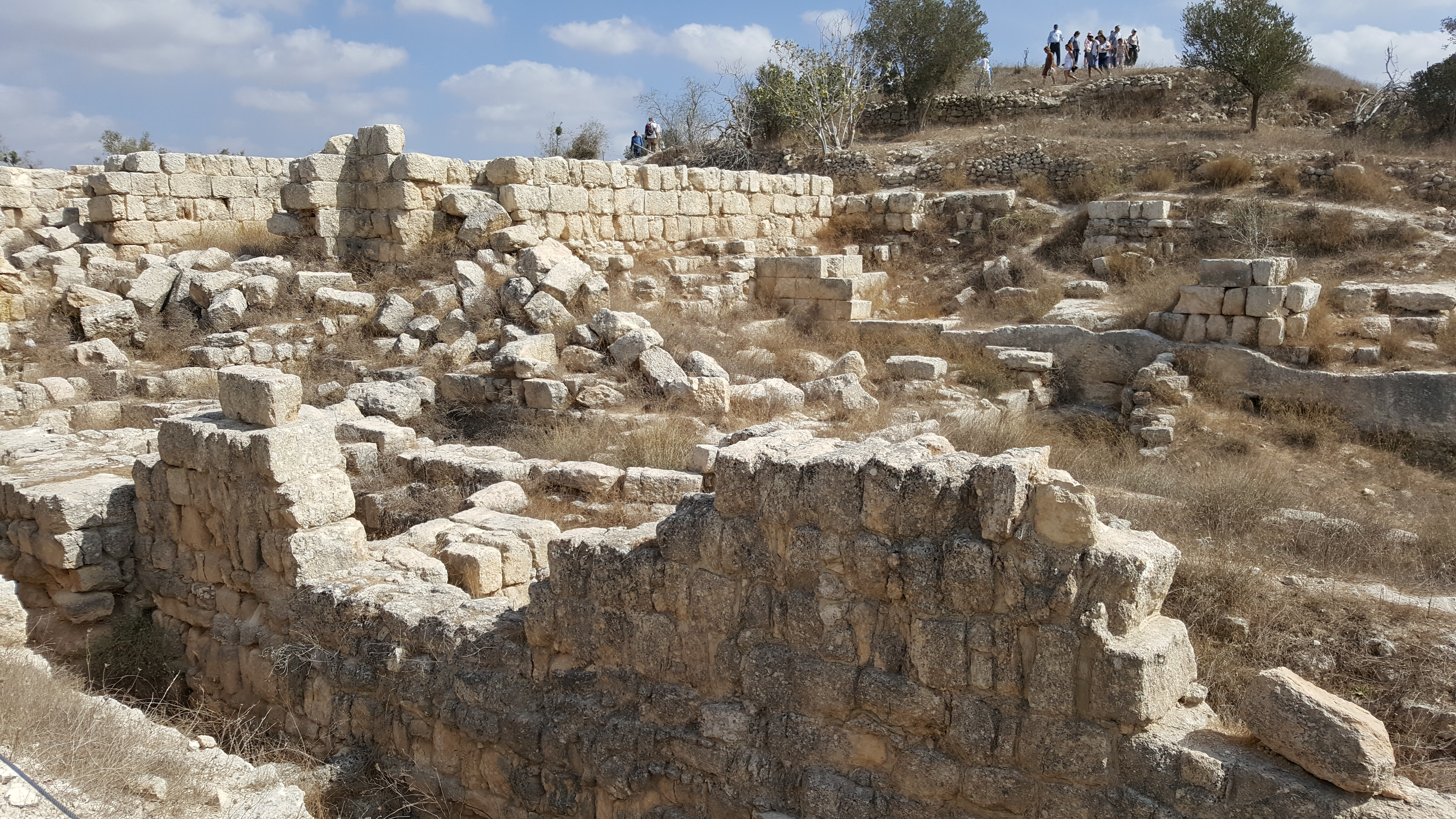
- Ruins of Samaria

- Location within the West Bank
- 32°16′35″N 35°11′42″E
- Cultures: Israelite; Samaritan; Hellenistic
- Region: Samaria (historical)

History
- Built: Agricultural activity (11th century BC); Capital of Israel (9th century BC); Herodian city (1st century BC)
- Built by: Omri, Ahab, Herod

Samaria (Hebrew: שֹׁמְרוֹן Šōmrōn; Akkadian: 𒊓𒈨𒊑𒈾 Samerina; Greek: Σαμάρεια Samareia) was the capital city of the northern Kingdom of Israel between c. 880 BC and c. 720 BC. The city gave its name to the surrounding region of Samaria, a historical region bounded by Judea to the south and by Galilee to the north. Strategically situated on a high hill, Samaria commanded views of the surrounding fertile countryside and was located near key trade routes connecting the highlands with the coastal plain.

Samaria was founded as Israel's royal capital by King Omri (884–873 BC), replacing Tirzah. According to the biblical account, which was composed in Judah but likely preserves records from Israel (possibly from Samaria itself), Omri purchased the hill from its previous owner, Shemer, for two talents of silver. Under the Omride dynasty, Samaria developed into a major royal and administrative center. Excavations reveal a massive palace complex, one of the largest in the Levant from this period, constructed in two main phases corresponding to the reigns of Omri and his successor, Ahab. Notable finds from the Israelite period include the Samaria Ivories, intricately carved ivory fragments inspired by Phoenician art, and the Samaria Ostraca, Hebrew-inscribed potsherds recording transactions such as shipments of wine and oil, which provide insight into the kingdom's bureaucratic organization.

After the Assyrian conquest of Israel c. 720 BC, Samaria was annexed by the Neo-Assyrian Empire and continued as an administrative centre. It retained this status in the Neo-Babylonian Empire and the Achaemenid Persian Empire before being destroyed during the Wars of Alexander the Great. The town was re-established as a military colony populated by Macedonian settlers, a status it retained until its conquest by the Hasmoneans. Later, under the hegemony of the Roman Republic and the subsequent Roman Empire, the city was rebuilt and expanded by the Jewish king Herod the Great, who also fortified it and renamed it "Sebastia" in honour of the Roman emperor Augustus.

The ancient city's hill is where the modern Palestinian village, retaining the Roman-era name Sebastia, is situated. The local archeological site is jointly administered by Israel and the Palestinian Authority, and is located on the hill's eastern slope. The remains are situated on the eastern part of the hill, and include the Omride palace, fortifications, the Herodian Augusteum, a stadium, and other public structures.

== Etymology ==
Samaria's biblical name, Šōmrōn (שֹׁמְרוֹן), means "watch" or "watchman" in Hebrew. The Hebrew Bible derives the name from the individual (or clan) Shemer (Hebrew: שמר), from whom King Omri (ruled 880s–870s BC) purchased the hill in order to build his new capital city (1 Kings 16:24).

In earlier cuneiform inscriptions, Samaria is referred to as "Bet Ḥumri" ("the house of Omri"); but in those of Tiglath-Pileser III (ruled 745–727 BC) and later it is called Samirin, after its Aramaic name, Shamerayin. The city of Samaria gave its name to the mountains of Samaria, the central region of the Land of Israel, surrounding the city of Shechem. This usage probably began after the city became Omri's capital, but is first documented only after its conquest by Sargon II of Assyria, who turned the kingdom into the province of Samerina.

== Geography ==
Samaria is strategically situated on a steep, high hill in a fertile region, commanding key trade routes and offering a commanding view of the surrounding countryside, which enhanced its defensive and administrative significance. In antiquity, the city was situated northwest of Shechem, near a major road leading westward to the Sharon Plain on the coast, and another heading northward through the Jezreel Valley to Phoenicia. This advantageous position likely played a role in Omri's foreign policy. The city lies approximately 50 kilometres (31 mi) north of Jerusalem.

== History ==
=== Iron Age I: Agricultural estate ===
Archaeological evidence indicates that the hill of Samaria was already occupied and cultivated in the Iron Age I, several centuries before Omri purchased the site in the 9th century BC. Bedrock installations, including oil and wine presses as well as bell-shaped cisterns, point to intensive agricultural activity during this period, particularly in viticulture and olive production. Pottery from Samaria's earliest phases includes forms datable no later than the 11th century BC, with close parallels at Megiddo, Taanach, and Tell Qasile. This material demonstrates continuous activity on the site from at least the 11th century until the establishment of Omri's capital in the early 9th century.

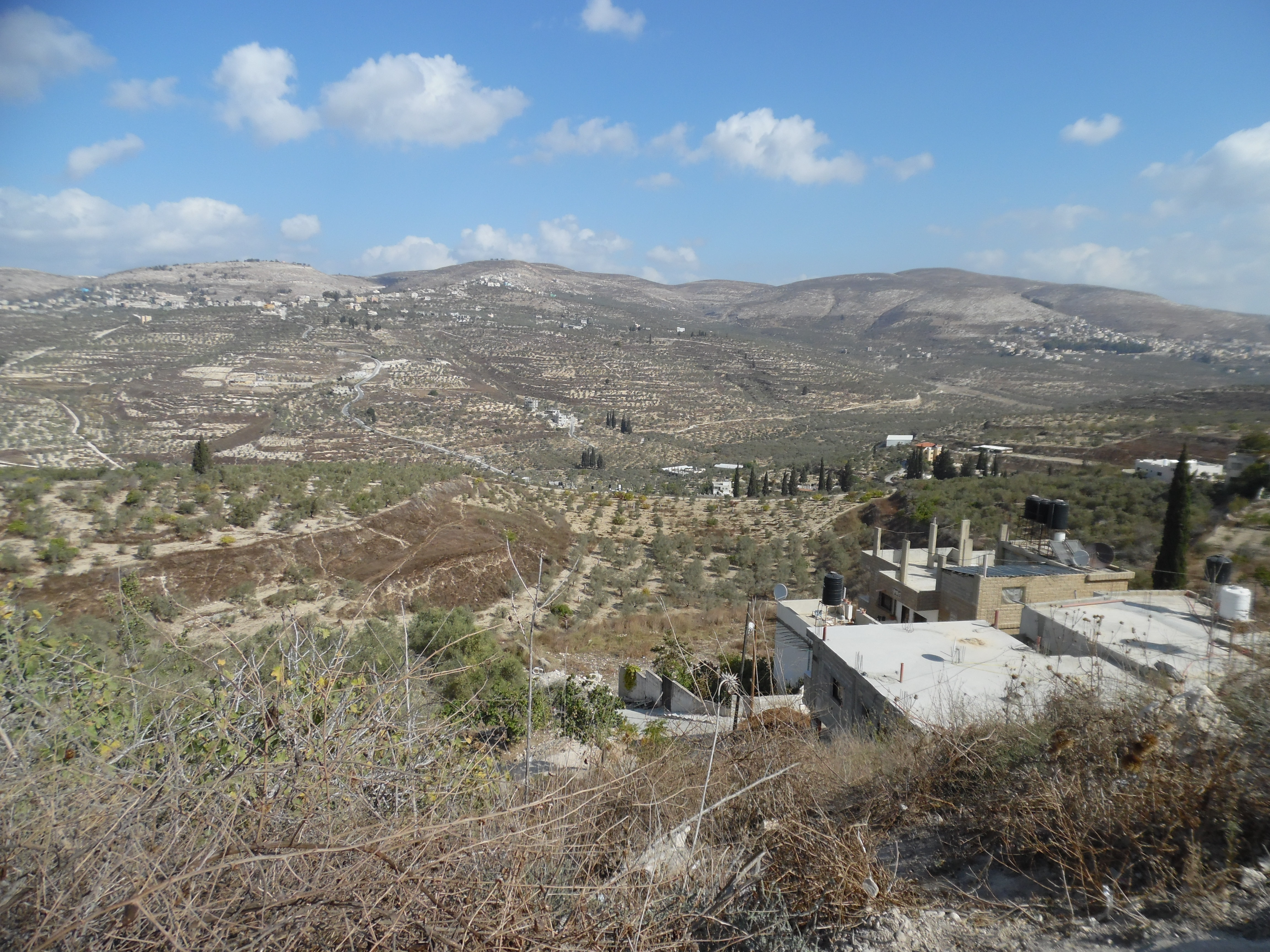
View of the agricultural countryside surrounding the archaeological site

Stager interprets these finds as evidence not of a "phantom" village, as earlier scholars had suggested, but of a substantial agricultural estate. He proposes that this was the estate of the clan of Shemer (or Shomron) mentioned in 1 Kings 16:24, and suggests that it likely included vineyards and olive groves on the surrounding slopes. The identification of these agricultural installations with the biblical estate of Shemer is also supported by Israel Finkelstein. The earliest reference to a settlement at this location may be the town of Shemer, or Shamir, which according to the Hebrew Bible was the home of the judge Tola in the 12th century BC (Judges 10:1–2). Stager further suggests a link between the estate and families of the tribe of Issachar, possibly the lineage of Tola, whose ancestral seat at Shamir may be connected linguistically and historically to Samaria's early name. The 'sons of Issachar' recorded in the genealogy of 1 Chronicles 7:1 relate Tola, the firstborn, to a brother named Shimron (according to the Masoretic Text) or Shomron (in the Septuagint), a name that likely gave rise to Samaria.

=== Iron Age II: Capital of Israel ===
==== Founding of the city ====
Samaria was established as the royal capital of Israel by Omri (884–873 BC), replacing Tirzah as the kingdom's political center. According to the biblical Books of Kings, Omri purchased the hill from its previous owner, Shemer, for two talents of silver and constructed a city on its broad summit, naming it Šōmrōn (Shomron), which later became known as Samaria in Greek. The biblical record of the purchase for two talents of silver suggests that the hill was already a productive and established estate rather than a barren site. The relocation of the capital may have been motivated by a desire to strengthen connections with the coastal plain and the port of Dor.

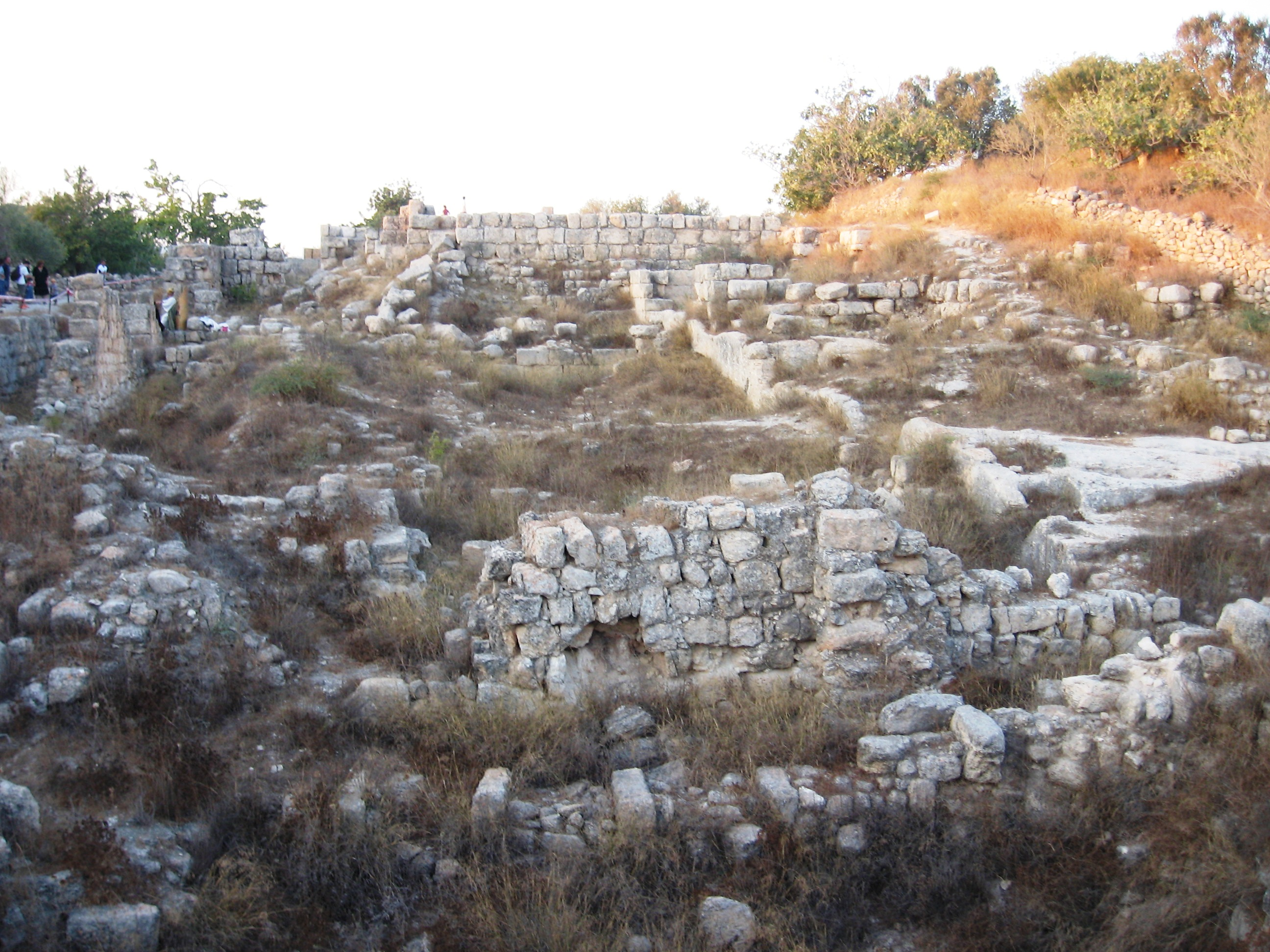
Remains of the palace of Ahab, the seventh king of Israel

Under the Omride dynasty (a period archaeologically referred to as late Iron Age II), a massive royal complex was constructed in Samaria, including a casemate wall and a palace considered one of the largest Iron Age structures in the Levant. Remains from the early Iron Age II (IIA) are missing or unidentified; Franklin believes this phase consisted of merely an agricultural estate. Excavations indicate that the palatial complex was built in two primary phases, corresponding to the reigns of Omri and Ahab. According to archaeologist Israel Finkelstein, the construction of the first palace marked the start of Israel's evolution into a more complex kingdom. A subsequent phase of urban development in the capital and across the kingdom reflects a more advanced stage of the dynasty, probably occurring during the reign of Ahab (873–852 BC). Omri is thought to have granted the Arameans the right to "make streets in Samaria" as a sign of submission (1 Kings 20:34).

It was the only great city of Israel created by the sovereign. All the others had been already consecrated by patriarchal tradition or previous possession. But Samaria was the choice of Omri alone. He, indeed, gave to the city which he had built the name of its former owner, but its especial connection with himself as its founder is proved by the designation which it seems Samaria bears in Assyrian inscriptions, "Beth-Khumri" ("the house or palace of Omri"). (Stanley)

==== Sieges ====
Samaria is frequently the subject of sieges in the biblical account. During the reign of Ahab, it says that Hadadezer of Aram-Damascus attacked it along with thirty-two vassal kings, but was defeated with a great slaughter (1 Kings 20:1–21). A year later, he attacked it again, but he was utterly routed once more, and was compelled to surrender to Ahab (1 Kings 20:28–34), whose army was no more than "two little flocks of kids" compared to that of Hadadezer (1 Kings 20:27).

According to 2 Kings, Ben Hadad of Aram-Damascus laid siege to Samaria during the reign of Jehoram, but just when success seemed to be within his reach, his forces suddenly broke off the siege, alarmed by a mysterious noise of chariots and horses and a great army, and fled, abandoning their camp and all its contents. The starving inhabitants of the city feasted on the spoils from the camp. As Prophet Elisha had predicted, "a measure of fine flour was sold for a shekel, and two measures of barley for a shekel, in the gates of Samaria" (2 Kings 6–7).

==== Fall of Samaria ====
Towards the end of the 8th century BC, possibly in 722 BC, Samaria was captured by the Neo-Assyrian Empire.

Finkelstein has suggested that the biblical accounts of the northern Israelite kings may have been composed in Samaria or at the sanctuary of Bethel. Following the fall of the northern kingdom in the eighth century BC, these records were transmitted to Judah, where they were eventually incorporated into the Hebrew Bible.

=== Assyrian, Babylonian, and Persian periods: Administrative center ===
Samaria became an administrative center under Assyrian, Babylonian, and Persian rule.

During the Persian period, Samaria appears to have been a prosperous city. Excavations indicate that much of the site from this period was later destroyed or built over during the Hellenistic period, so surviving evidence is limited. Finds include coins, some Greek pottery, seal impressions, limestone altars, and Aramaic-inscribed sherds. A building with plastered floors and circular basins may have served as an industrial facility. Archaeological layers reveal extensive leveling and preparation of the summit, with fertile soil spread over a broad area, possibly for a Persian-style garden or park.

=== Hellenistic period: Macedonian military colony ===
During the Hellenistic period, Samaria underwent a significant demographic transformation. According to Curtius Rufus, writing several centuries later, the Samaritans staged a revolt against Alexander the Great, during which they burned the new Macedonian governor of Coele-Syria alive. Alexander traveled to Samaria and executed those responsible, who had been handed over to him. According to Eusebius's Chronicon, he also razed the city before establishing it as a military colony. Later, Eusebius notes that in 296 BC, Samaria was destroyed once more by Demetrius Poliorcetes during a military campaign conducted in opposition to Ptolemaic control of the region.

Following the Hellenistic conquest, the city was settled by Macedonian colonists, displacing the local Samaritan population. The Samaritans instead settled at the nearby, then abandoned site of Shechem. Archaeological evidence from this period indicates a transition from indigenous, informal housing to more structured Hellenistic-style homes, as well as the development of an urban layout organized around a main street with secondary streets branching from it. Around 200 BC, the Macedonian settlers repaired and reinforced the existing Israelite fortifications of the upper city: the corners of the ramparts were flanked by strong round towers, three of which have been excavated: two at the southwest corner and one at the northeast corner, described as "the finest monument of the Hellenistic age" in the region. Archaeological remains from the third century BC on the northern slope of the tell include two reliefs depicting symbols associated with the Dioscuri and a dedication to the Egyptian deities Isis and Serapis, indicating the practice of Hellenistic religion by the Greek colonists. The latter is a Greek dedicatory inscription on black limestone reading, "Hegesandros, Xenarchis and their children to Sarapis Isis," which may have originated from a Ptolemaic-period temple dedicated to these deities.

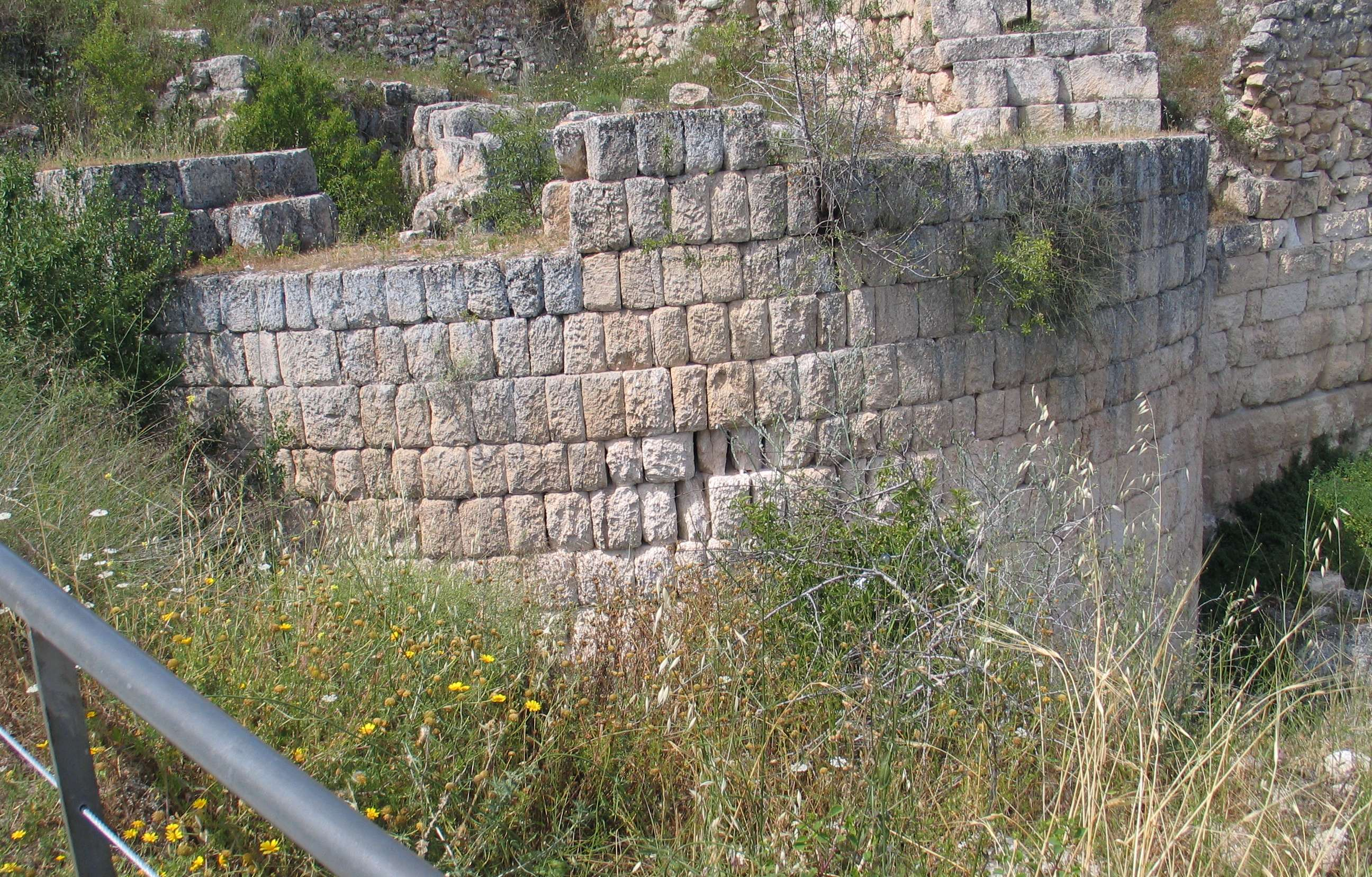
Remnants of the Hellenistic-era Samaria round tower

During the Hasmonean Revolt, the Seleucid general Apollonius raised an army that included Macedonian troops from Samaria to fight against the Jewish rebels led by Judas Maccabeus; this force was defeated at the Battle of the Ascent of Lebonah in 167/6 BC. By the mid-second century BC, in response to the expansion of the Jewish Hasmonean state, the inhabitants rebuilt the upper city wall. The new wall incorporated numerous salient projections, measured approximately 4 meters thick, and reused material from the earlier Israelite rampart. In the beginning, the older towers were kept to strengthen the wall, but they were soon replaced with protruding quadrangular bastions. The lower town was also fortified, combining reused Israelite masonry with new Hellenistic construction.

In the late second century BC, Samaria was captured by the Hasmoneans under John Hyrcanus following a siege led by his sons, Antigonus and Aristobulus, which began sometime between 111 and 107 BC. According to Josephus, Hyrcanus' aimed to punish the inhabitants for attacks they had carried out against the people of Maresha. Bezalel Bar-Kochva, following an emendation proposed by Michael Avi-Yonah, argues that Josephus's reference to the Mariseans is a textual corruption of "Gariseans", referring to the inhabitants of Gerasa (modern Jurish, southeast of Shechem). He argues that Hyrcanus used attacks on the settlement as a pretext to complete Hasmonean control of the central Samarian highland ridge. The defenders of Samaria appealed to Antiochus IX for assistance, including a force of 6,000 troops supplied by Ptolemy IX, but these reinforcements were defeated. According to Megillat Taanit 25, "Samaria-wall" fell on 25 Marheshvan. Josephus reports that John Hyrcanus razed the city, digging channels so that rainwater would gradually erase the ruins. This act was probably intended to fulfill a prophecy mentioned in Micah 1:6.

=== Roman period: Herod's Sebaste ===
The Romans, who conquered Judaea in 63 BC, generally favored restoring or enhancing Hellenized cities as centers of local administration. In 55 BC, the Roman governor of Syria Aulus Gabinius reportedly ordered the rebuilding of several towns, including Samaria.

In 30 BC, Emperor Augustus granted Samaria and its surrounding territory to Herod the Great, king of Judaea, as part of his client kingdom. Herod had already shown interest in Samaria before this, having repaired parts of the city in 43 BC, and transferred his family there during his conflict with Antigonus. In 37 BC, he married Mariamne, the Hasmonean princess, in the city. Herod refounded the city as Sebaste (from Greek Sebastos, the feminine equivalent of the Latin Augustus), in tribute to the emperor. This made Sebaste one of the first cities to adopt the title shortly after the Roman Senate bestowed the name Augustus upon him in January of that year. Herod's building program transformed Samaria into a Greco-Roman city. He populated it with a loyal population, settling around 6,000 colonists, many of whom were former soldiers from his army. On the southern side of the acropolis, Herod built a grand pagan temple dedicated to Augustus (the Augusteum) at the city's highest point. A monumental staircase and podium from this temple are still visible among the ruins. Herod also restored and extended the city's walls, fortifying them with defensive towers, and a city gate was constructed on the western side, supported by round towers. Additionally, Sebaste was equipped with entertainment and civic facilities: archaeology confirms the presence of a large rectangular structure on the northeastern side of the city, likely a stadium, which appears to date to Herod's time. Lastly, Herod significantly restored and extended the fortifications of Samaria, enclosing an area of approximately 75 hectares, the largest in the city's history.

Upon Herod's death in 4 BC, Sebaste became part of the Tetrarchy of his son Archelaus, and later was incorporated into the Roman province of Judaea after 6 AD. A Roman military presence continued: units named Sebastenorum ("of Sebaste") are attested in the imperial army, including a cavalry Ala I Sebastenorum and infantry Cohors I Sebastenorum, which were recruited from or garrisoned in Sebaste. These troops even served outside Samaria: they are known to have been stationed in Caesarea Maritima, for example. Josephus mentions that under the governorship of Felix, most local recruits to the Roman military were from Caesarea and Sebaste. The majority of Sebaste's residents during the Roman era were Gentiles practicing Greco-Roman religions. Tensions with neighboring Jewish communities occasionally flared; during the First Jewish–Roman War (66–73 AD), Jewish rebels attacked Sebaste in 66. According to Josephus, in the chaos at the war's outset, Jewish forces from the surrounding area retaliated against non-Jewish towns, and Sebaste was razed by Jewish insurgents.

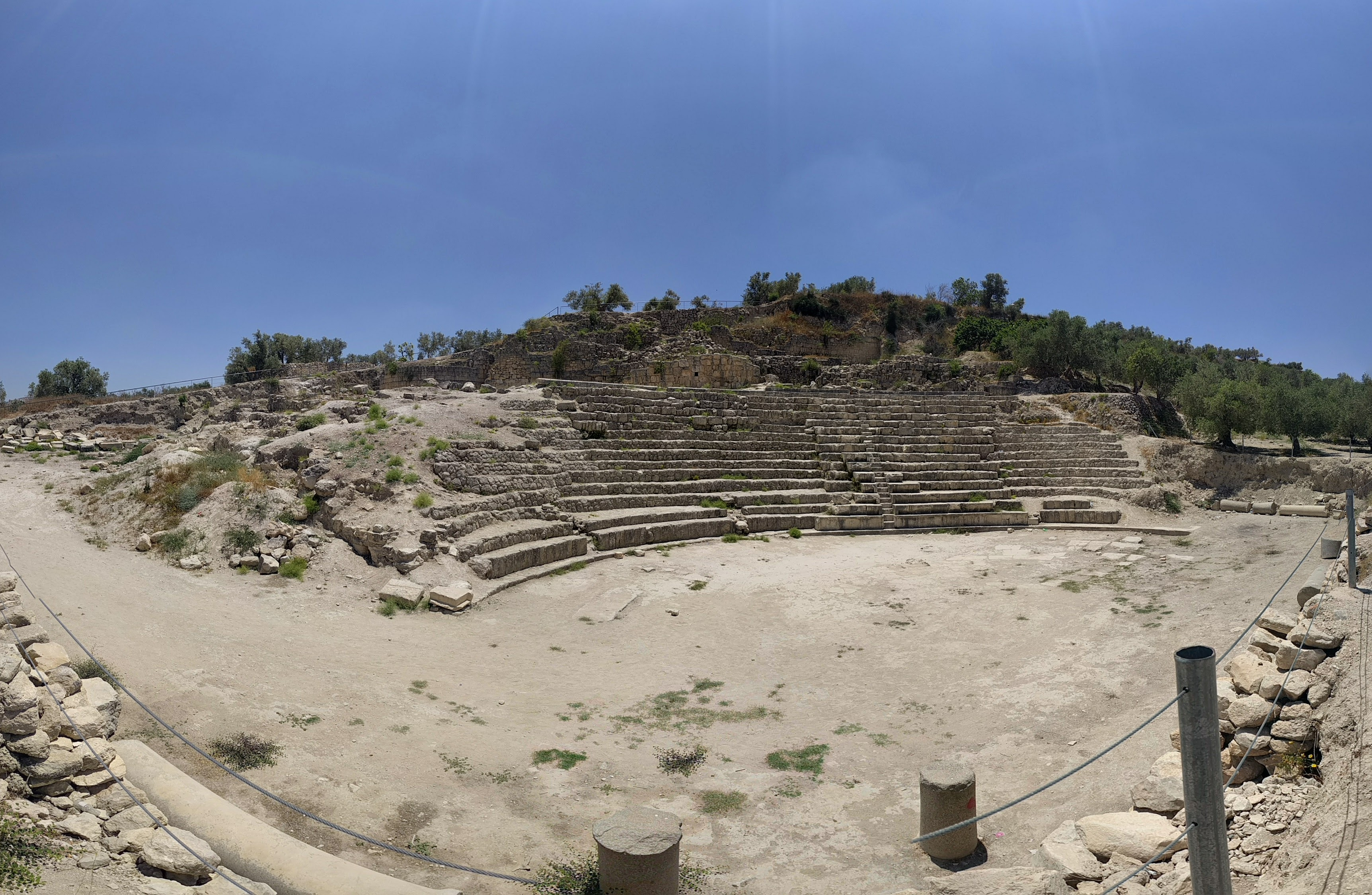
Ruined Roman amphitheater at Samaria

In the following centuries, Sebaste remained an important town, though it never surpassed the growing city of Flavia Neapolis (modern Nablus), founded in 72 AD a few miles southeast. Neapolis, located at a crossroads below Mount Gerizim, eventually became the chief city of the region of Samaria, benefiting from a new layout and imperial support. In contrast, Sebaste, while still significant, took on a more local market town role. Around 200, Emperor Septimius Severus elevated Sebaste's status to a Roman colonia, bringing an influx of Roman veterans and their families. Archaeological evidence suggests that under Severus, a second phase of civic development occurred, including the completion of a large colonnaded street (cardo) running east–west through the city, lined with about 600 stone columns. A new basilica, possibly serving as the seat of the colonial administration or a marketplace, was also constructed during this period. The Herodian-era Augusteum appears to have been rebuilt under Severus's rule.

By the 2nd and 3rd centuries AD, the cult of Kore is attested at Sebaste through inscriptions, statuary, and civic coinage. Graffiti referring to the goddess, paleographically dated to 50–150 AD, was inscribed on the plastered walls of the stadium. In the 3rd century, a temple dedicated to her was built north of the acropolis. In addition, a statue of the goddess was found at Sebaste's stadium, her figure appears on the city's coins, and several altars and other inscribed objects mention her by name.

=== Late antiquity and aftermath ===
During the Byzantine period, Sebaste served as an episcopal seat. Several churches were constructed in the city, commemorating traditions that identified Sebaste as the burial place of John the Baptist. Another Christian tradition from this period also associated the site with the tomb of the prophet Elisha. The city maintained its prominence until the Arab conquest of the Levant in 636 AD, after which Sebaste was reduced in size and importance, becoming a small village. During the Crusader period, a church dedicated to John the Baptist was built within the village, preserving the Byzantine-era tradition of veneration at the site. This church was later converted into a mosque following the fall of the Crusader kingdom.

== Research history ==
Samaria was first excavated by the Harvard Expedition, initially directed by Gottlieb Schumacher in 1908 and then by George Andrew Reisner in 1909 and 1910; with the assistance of architect C.S. Fisher and D.G. Lyon.

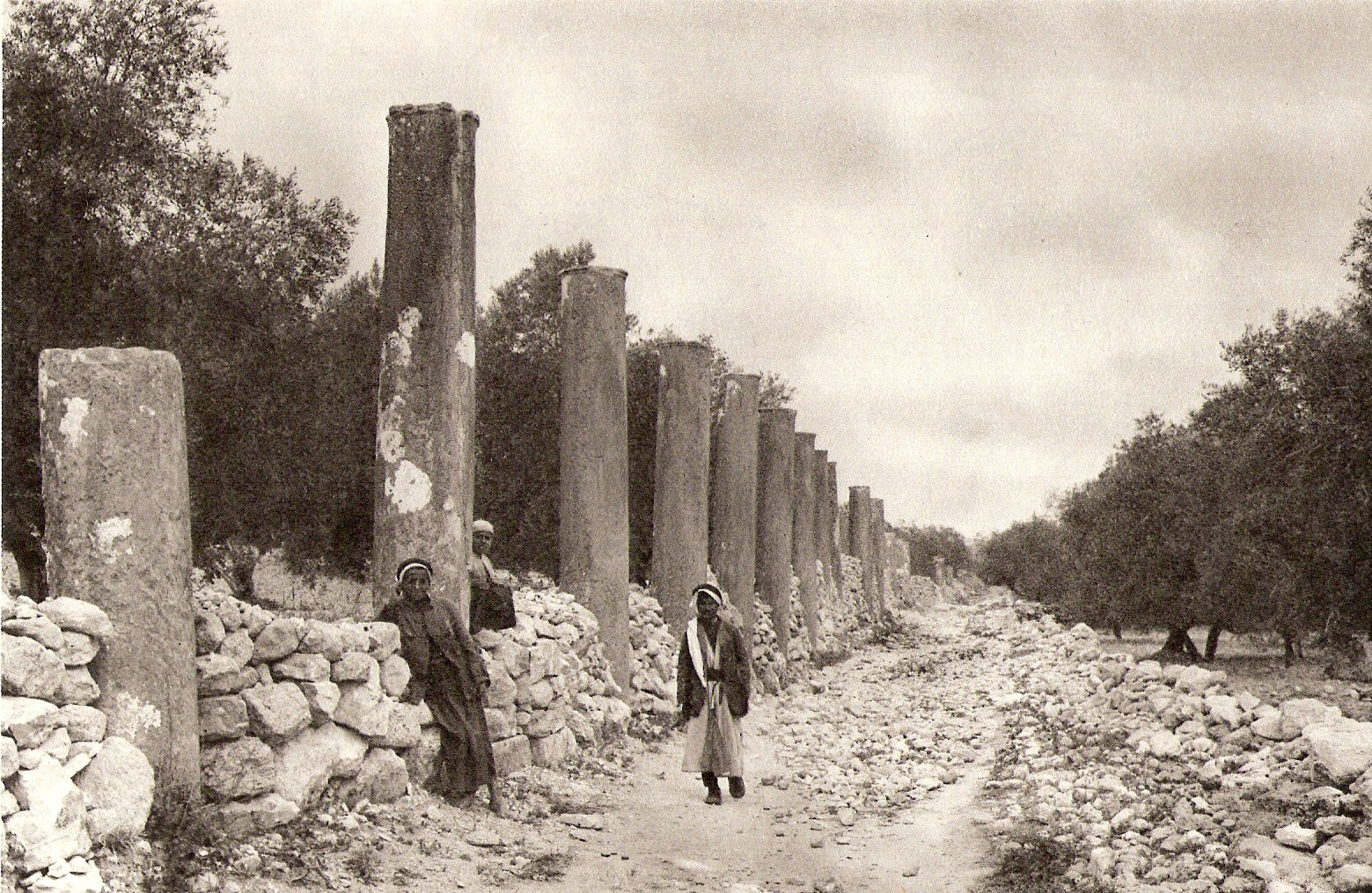
Ruins of Samaria, early 20th century

Reisner's dig unearthed the Samaria Ostraca, a collection of 102 ostraca written in the Paleo-Hebrew Script.

A second expedition was known as the Joint Expedition, a consortium of 5 institutions directed by John Winter Crowfoot between 1931 and 1935; with the assistance of Kathleen Mary Kenyon, Eliezer Sukenik and G.M. Crowfoot. The leading institutions were the British School of Archaeology in Jerusalem, the Palestine Exploration Fund, and the Hebrew University.

In the 1960s, further small scale excavations directed by Fawzi Zayadine were carried out on behalf of the Department of Antiquities of Jordan.

== Archaeology ==
According to Israel Finkelstein, Samaria is "a highly important site for the study of the archaeology of Israel in the Iron II in general and the days of the Omride dynasty in particular." In 2012 Sebastia was added to the tentative list of World Heritage Sites in Palestine, ultimately for nomination as a UNESCO World Heritage Site.

In late July-early August 2022, Palestinians set fire to the ancient stones at the archaeological site, causing extensive damage and vandalizing it with Arabic graffiti. Later, in December, Palestinians attacked the site again, causing "irreparable damage", according to the Samaria Regional Council. In 2023, the Palestinian Authority paved a new road at the archeological site which, according to Shomrim al HaNetzach ('Guardians of Eternity', an offshoot of Regavim), destroyed a Herodian-era wall in the process, while burial caves from the Second Temple period were also broken into and looted.

In November 2025, Israel announced plans to expropriate 1,800 dunams (1.8 km^{2}; 0.69 sq mi) of land around the archaeological site making it the largest archaeological site expropriated in the West Bank. The Israeli government said the move was to protect the site from looting; heritage organisation Emek Shaveh said that "The site itself is under Israeli both security and civilian control, which means that had they wanted to, the staff officer for archaeology could have allocated resources, personnel in order to oversee that the site was well taken care of, to keep away looters and so forth". The Palestinian Authority said the expropriation was a way of furthering annexation of the West Bank. The plaque installed at the site by the Palestinian authorities omits any mention of Samaria as the capital of the Kingdom of Israel. The description jumps directly from the Canaanites to the reign of Herod (who is described as a "Roman leader"), bypassing the Israelite historical record.

=== Israelite palace and acropolis ===
The Israelite palace complex of Samaria, situated on the city's acropolis, is one of the largest Iron Age palaces known in the Levant. Excavations indicate that the complex was built in two primary phases, corresponding to the reigns of Omri and Ahab. The first phase, associated with Omri, involved the construction of a palace on the scarp surrounded by agricultural installations. The second phase, attributed to Ahab, saw an extension of the palace and the creation of a larger royal compound on a raised podium.

The palace, constructed of massive roughly dressed blocks on a solid rock core, is comparable in size and splendor to palaces built at the same period in northern Syria. Its exposed foundations measure approximately 55 by 40 meters, and it is complemented by several auxiliary buildings on the west and northeast, likely serving administrative functions. Surrounding the summit was a large casemate wall, built of ashlar blocks laid in the headers-and-stretchers technique and filled with earth. This wall functioned primarily as a structural terrace supporting the podium rather than as a defensive fortification, creating a significant height difference between the inner platform and the outer slope. The eastern side of the royal enclosure featured the main gate, positioned where the slope was gentler. Six proto-Ionic capitals used as spolia discovered nearby may have originally adorned a monumental gateway to the palace. This gate may have been comparable in design to a slightly later structure at Khirbet Mudeibi, east of the Dead Sea.

According to Norma Franklin, there is a possibility that the tombs of Omri and Ahab are located beneath the Iron Age palace.

=== Samaria Ivories ===
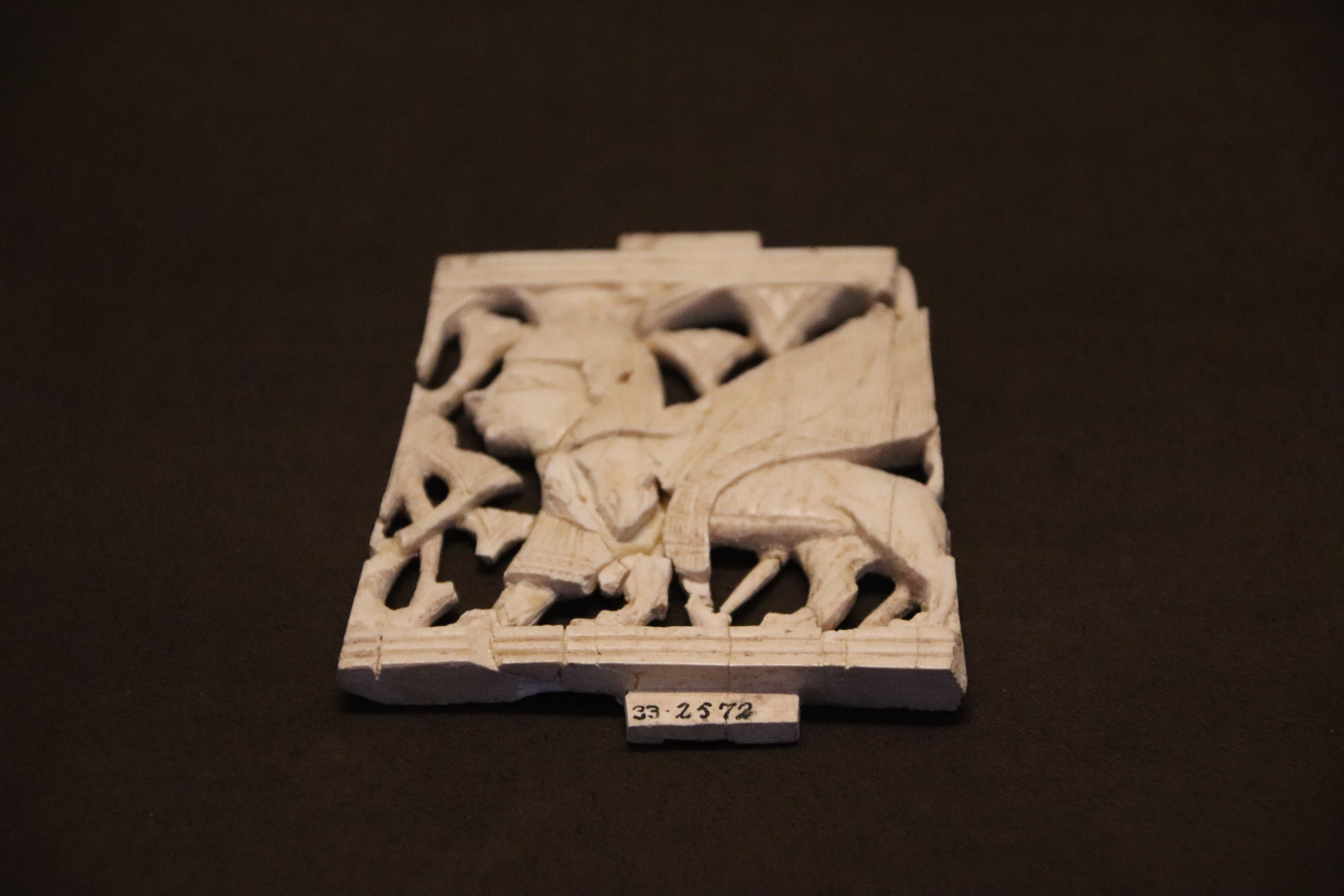
Ivory Furniture Inlay, 9th-8th Century BC

Excavations in the palace uncovered 500 pieces of carved ivory, portraying exotic animals and plants, mythological creatures, and foreign deities, among other things. Some scholars identified those with the "palace adorned with ivory" mentioned in the Bible (1 Kings 22:39). Some of the ivories are on display at the Israel Museum in Jerusalem and in other locations across the world.

=== Samaria Ostraca ===
The Samaria Ostraca (SO) are a collection of more than a hundred inscribed pottery shards discovered in Samaria in 1910. They primarily date to the 9th–8th centuries BC, when Israel was ruled by kings Jehoash and Jeroboam II. The ostraca record deliveries of commodities, including aged wine (yn yšn) and washed oil (šmn rḥṣ), to recipients in and around Samaria, particularly from the western region of the Shechem Syncline. According to archaeologist Matthew Suriano, the texts employ Standard Israelian Hebrew (SIH), a scribal standardization distinct from the southern Hebrew (SBH) used in the kingdom of Judah. The inscriptions are considered one of the most significant epigraphic corpora for understanding the economics, language, and personal naming practices in ancient Israel.

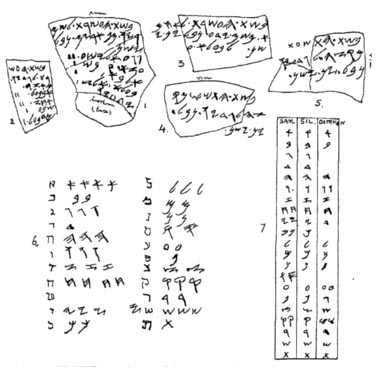
Drawings of the Samaria Ostraca and corresponding alphabetic notations, used in northern Israel during the Iron Age

Some scholars interpret the Samaria Ostraca as evidence of a centralized state system for collecting taxes or resources, while others view them as reflecting interactions between regional clan elites and the royal residence. Many entries list personal names, localities, or clans, including nearly all of the clans of the Tribe of Manasseh known from biblical descriptions, with all mentioned localities situated within four to twelve kilometers of the capital, Samaria. Aged wine and washed oil appear to have been prestige commodities, distributed as gifts or for competitive feasting to consolidate political alliances and maintain loyalty among clan leaders.

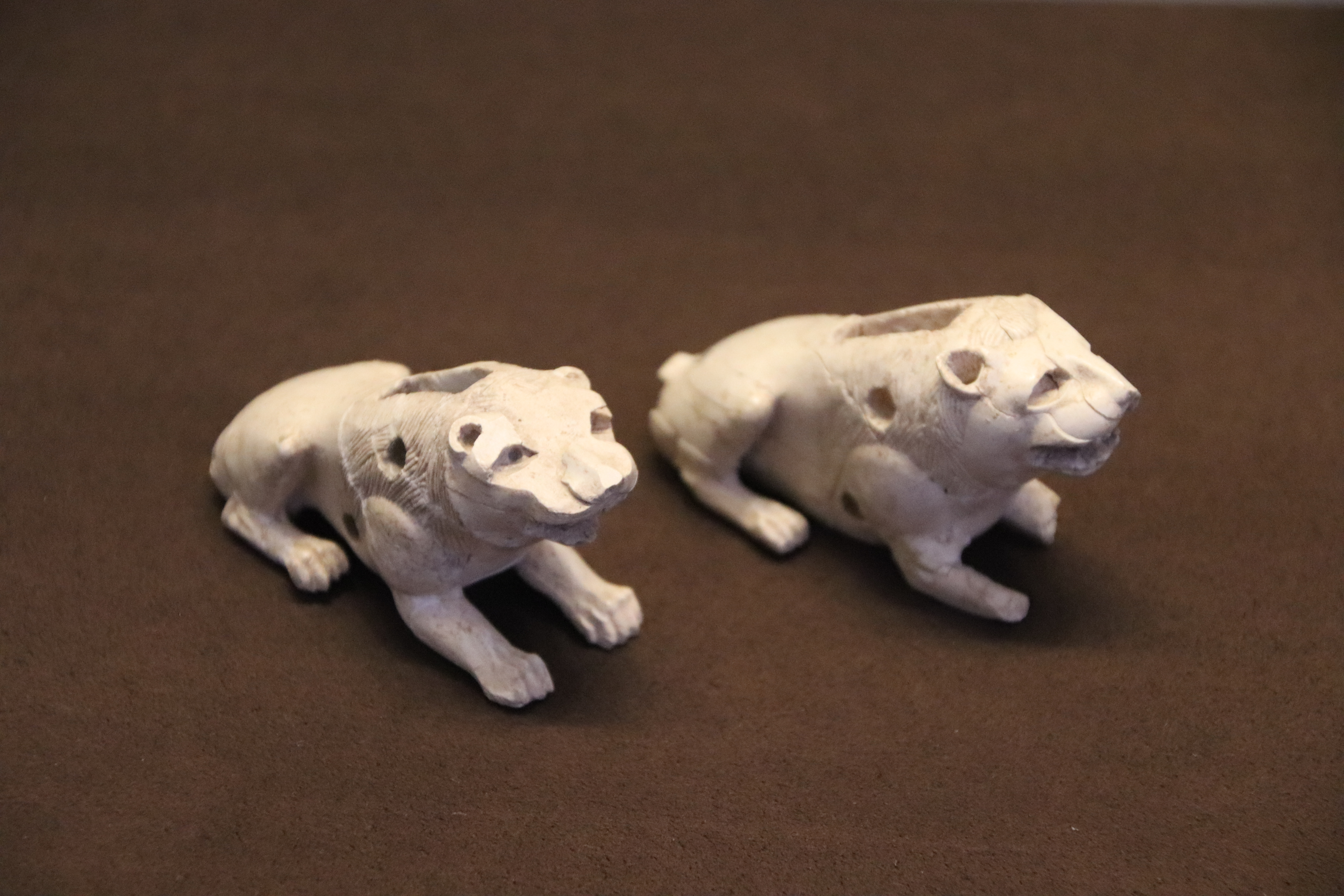
Carved ivory pieces unearthed in Samaria, now on display at the Israel Museum in the city of Jerusalem

=== Augusteum ===
On the southern side of the acropolis, at the highest point of the city, lie the remains of a temple dedicated to Augustus, known as the Augusteum. This temple stood on a raised platform some 4–5 meters above its immediate surroundings, with a rectangular plan measuring approximately 33.5 by 24 meters. A large forecourt, set about 4.5 meters below the temple level, was connected to the temple by a monumental staircase roughly 24 meters wide. The forecourt itself was surrounded by double colonnades extending about 83 meters north–south and 72 meters east–west, while the inner faces of the colonnades were supported by an underground corridor that also provided storage space and structural support for the colonnades above.

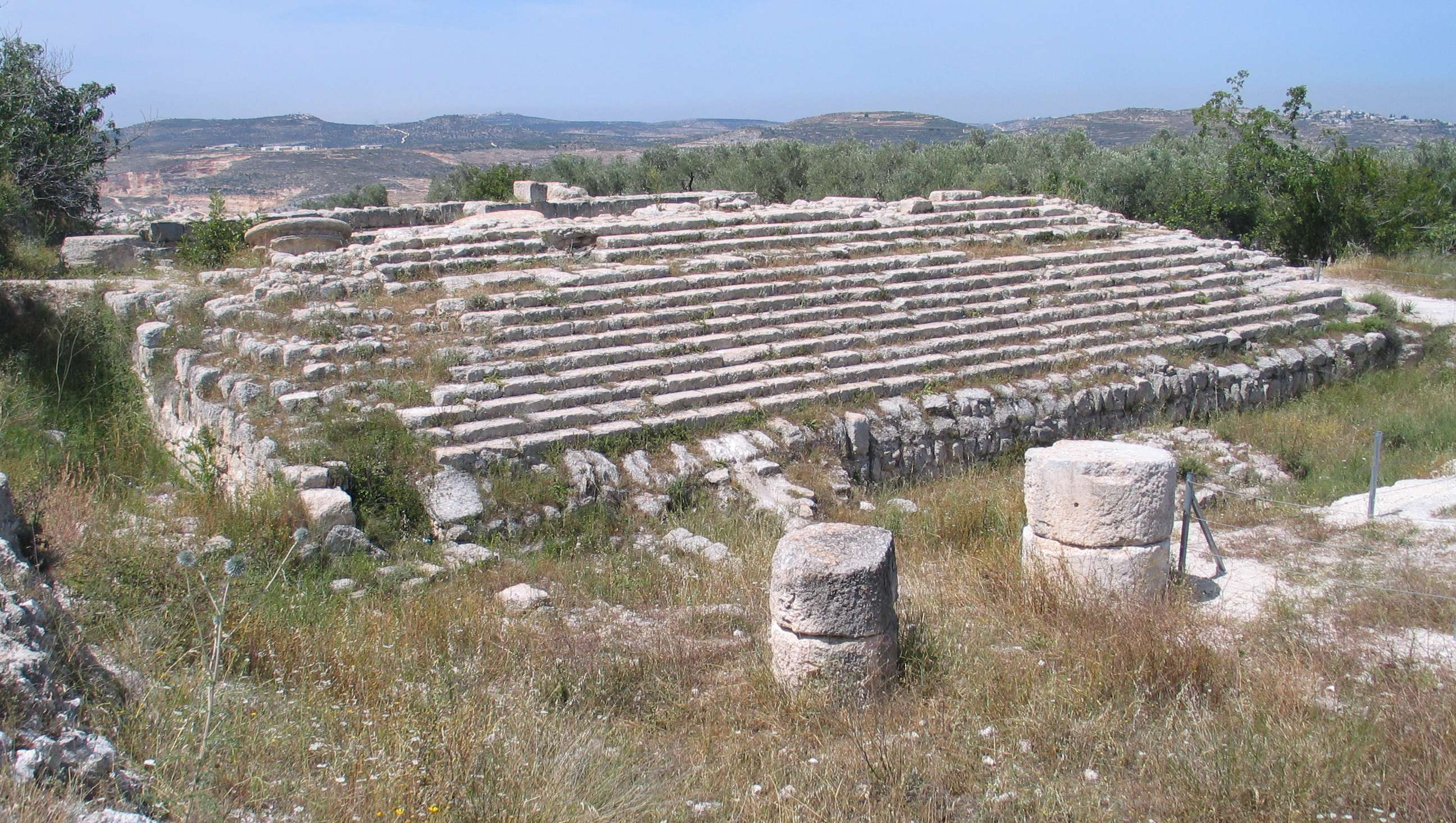
Remnants of the Temple of Augustus

The temple complex underwent several construction phases. It was originally built during the reign of Herod the Great in the late 1st century BC and later underwent partial rebuilding, likely during the reign of Septimius Severus in the early 3rd century AD. Foundations for the northern portion of the forecourt included U-shaped walls filled with soil to raise the level above the valley below, a solution that allowed the double colonnades to be erected. The interior layout of the temple remains partially speculative, but it may have featured a naos with surrounding colonnades or a naos divided into central and lateral aisles. Access to the precinct likely involved a ceremonial stairway or bridge connecting the lower city streets to the elevated forecourt, with additional secondary entrances connecting directly to the temple and associated storerooms.

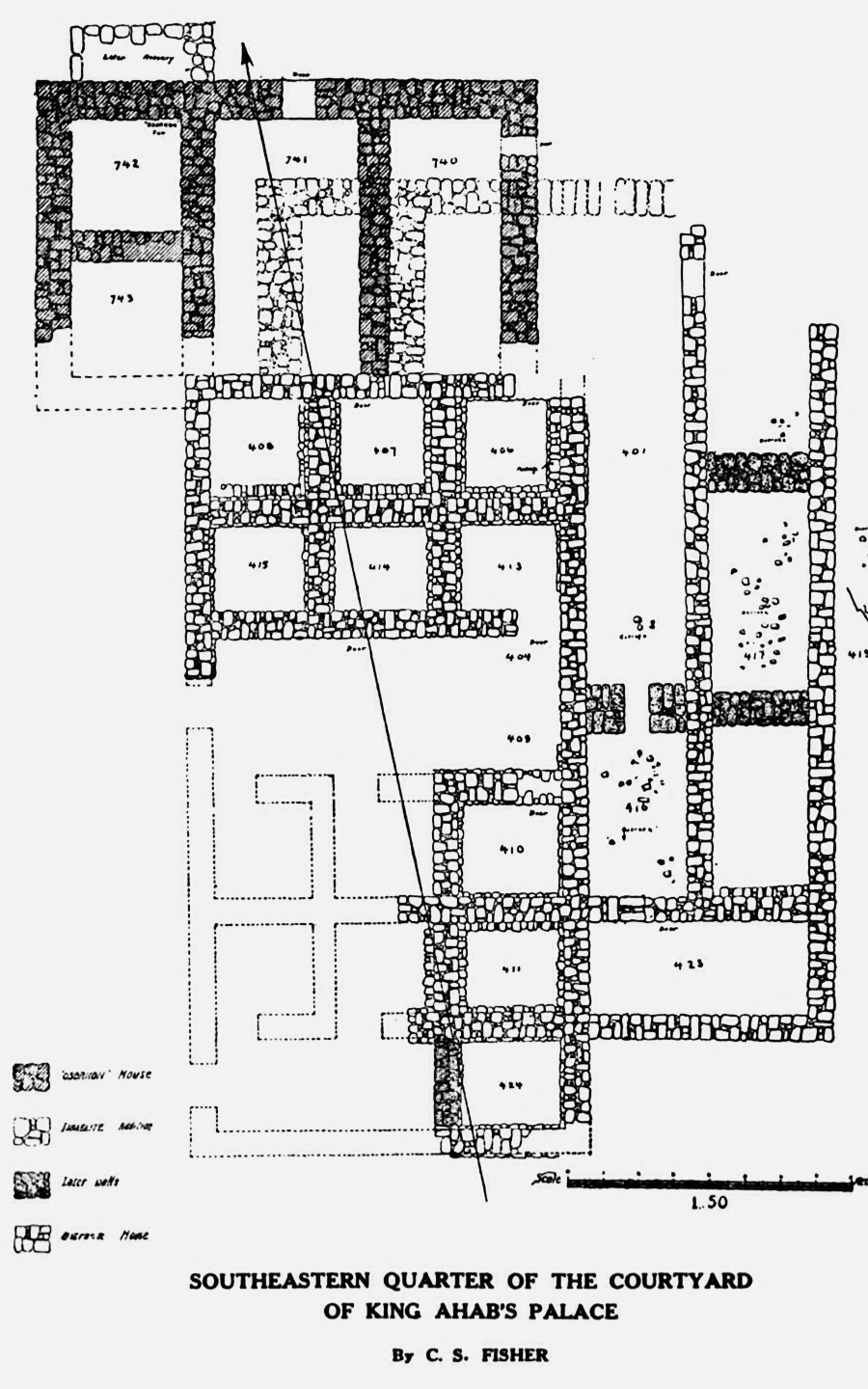
Site plan of Ostraca House (1910)

=== Stadium ===
Excavations on the northeastern side of the ancient city revealed a large rectangular structure, believed to be the remains of a Herodian-era stadium. The structure measures 205 meters in length and 67 meters in width, with a central courtyard of 193 by 55 meters. Surrounding the courtyard were Doric-style colonnades. The inner surfaces of the colonnades were adorned with frescoes, a characteristic feature of Herodian architecture, with alternating red and yellow panels above a red dado. The dimensions of the courtyard align with the length of one stade, suggesting the structure may have been intended for athletic events. However, its smaller size raises the possibility that it could have also served other purposes, such as training for horse or chariot races.

The first architectural phase consisted of a Doric peristyle constructed of soft limestone coasted with thick pianted plaster, including preserved rew and yellow panels. On these plastered walls, excavators found graffiti and dipinti referring to the goddess Kore, one reading: "May the learned master Martialis and his friends be remembered by the Kore," and another mnetioning "Pomponius Rufus, hierktistes", with the lettering dated paleographically to around 50–150 AD. During a later rebuilding completed at the end of the 2nd century, the stadium received a new Corinthian peristyle.

A cistern built against the western enclosure wall of the stadium produced significant cultic finds. In it were discovered the head and torch of a statue of Kore, whose style and attributes, including a torch, pomegranate, and ears of wheat, led excavators to date it to the second century AD. The same cistern contained a painted marble acclamation reading: "One god / of all / the ruler / great Kore / the invincible". Two additional statues were also found there: the nude body of a youthful Dionysos, and a headless draped female figure, tentatively identified as Demeter. Elsewhere in the stadium's arena, excavators uncovered a third-century altar inscribed: "Calpurianus, son of Gaianus, high priest to the Lady Kore", along with three more latars, two of them uniscribeed and one with an illegible inscription.

=== Temple of Kore ===
The Harvard excavations in the 1930s uncovered the foundations of a temple of Kore, which was built in the third century AD on a terrace north of the acropolis. The remains of the structure, which measured about 36 x 15.5 meters, incorporate reused architectural blocks originating from earlier structures, including Herodian-style ashlars, Ionic capitals, Attic column bases, cornice blocks, column drums, and stones carved with the caps of the Dioscuri. Other reused elements include soft-limestone crenellated parapet blocks with painted stucco and a block carved with a double-axe.

=== Fortifications ===
The Herodian-era walls partly follow the earlier Hellenistic-era lines, particularly on the southern side, while new sections on the north expanded the city to incorporate the valley chosen for the stadium. The fortifications, built largely along the terrain's contours, included straight sections interrupted by towers at key turning points; at least 30 towers have been documented, some rectangular and others round. One of the round towers is particularly notable: situated north of the western gate, it has a diameter of approximately 11 meters. The western gate itself was flanked by two round towers, 12 meters in diameter and spaced 13.2 meters apart. Constructed of ashlar masonry with alternating courses of headers and stretchers, the walls and towers display the distinctive Herodian masonry style also evident at Herodium.

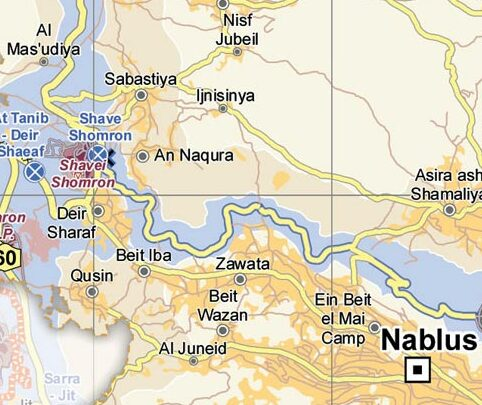
Tel Sebastia, controlled by Israel as part of Area C, just west of Sebastia, Nablus

== See also ==
- Tel Hazor
- Tel Megiddo
- Tel Jezreel
- Omrides
- Architecture of ancient Israel
- Biblical archeology
- Cities of the ancient Near East
- List of modern names for biblical place names

== Bibliography ==
=== Sources ===
- Crowfoot, J. W.; Kenyon, K. M.; Sukenik, E. L. (1942). "Samaria-Sebaste, Reports of the Joint Expedition, Volume I: The Buildings". Palestine Exploration Fund Annual. London.
- de Vaux, Roland (1967). "Tirzah". In Thomas, D. W. (ed.). Archaeology and Old Testament Study. Oxford. pp. 371–383.
- Finkelstein, Israel (2013). The Forgotten Kingdom: The Archaeology and History of Northern Israel. Ancient Near East Monographs. Atlanta: Society of Biblical Literature. ISBN 978-1589839106. OCLC 880456140.
- Goldstein, Jonathan A. (2007). "The Hasmonean Revolt and the Hasmonean Dynasty". The Hellenistic Age. The Cambridge History of Judaism. Vol. 2 (4th ed.). Cambridge University Press. pp. 292–351. ISBN 978-0-521-21929-7.
- Grabbe, Lester L. (2006). A History of the Jews and Judaism in the Second Temple Period: The Persian Period (539–331 BCE). The Library of Second Temple Studies. Vol. 1. T&T Clark. ISBN 9780567216175.
- Halpern-Zylberstein, Marie-Christine (2007). "The archeology of Hellenistic Palestine". The Hellenistic Age. The Cambridge History of Judaism. Vol. 2 (4th ed.). Cambridge University Press. pp. 1–34. ISBN 978-0-521-21929-7.
- Kaufman, Ivan T. (1982). "The Samaria Ostraca: An Early Witness to Hebrew Writing". The Biblical Archaeologist. 45 (4): 229–239. doi:10.2307/3209768. ISSN 0006-0895.
- Hengel, Martin (2007). "The political and social history of Palestine from Alexander to Antiochus III (333–187 BCE)". The Hellenistic Age. The Cambridge History of Judaism. Vol. 2 (4th ed.). Cambridge University Press. pp. 35–78. ISBN 978-0-521-21929-7.
- Magness, Jodi (2001). "The Cults of Isis and Kore at Samaria-Sebaste in the Hellenistic and Roman Periods". Harvard Theological Review. 94 (2): 157–177. JSTOR 3657401 – via JSTOR.
- Nam, Roger S (2012-10-01). "Power Relations in the Samaria Ostraca". Palestine Exploration Quarterly. 144 (3): 155–163. doi:10.1179/0031032812Z.00000000015. ISSN 0031-0328.
- Netzer, Ehud (2020). "Building Projects in Samaria-Sebaste". In Hengel, Martin; Schäfer, Peter (eds.). The Architecture of Herod, the Great Builder. Texts and Studies in Ancient Judaism. Vol. 117. Mohr Siebeck. pp. 81–93. ISBN 978-3-16-148570-1.
- Niemann, Hermann Michael (2008-09-01). "A New Look at the Samaria Ostraca: The King-Clan Relationship". Tel Aviv. 35 (2): 249–266. doi:10.1179/tav.2008.2008.2.249. ISSN 0334-4355.
- Rogers, Guy MacLean (2022). For the Freedom of Zion: The Great Revolt of Jews against Romans, 66–74 CE. Yale University Press. ISBN 978-0-300-24813-5. Archived from the original on 7 December 2024.
- Stager, Lawrence E. (1990). "Shemer's Estate". Bulletin of the American Schools of Oriental Research. 277/278. American Schools of Oriental Research: 93–107. JSTOR 1357375.
- Suriano, Matthew (2007-03-01). "A Fresh Reading for 'Aged Wine' in the Samaria Ostraca". Palestine Exploration Quarterly. 139 (1): 27–33. doi:10.1179/003103207x162997. ISSN 0031-0328.
