= Aeolic order =

Early order of Classical architecture

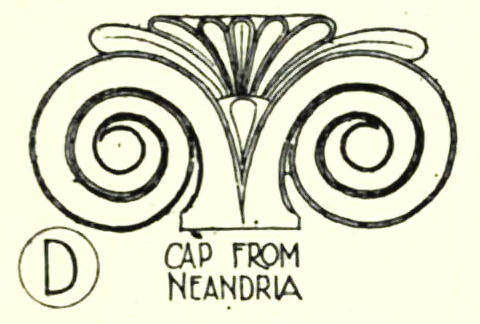
Drawing of an Aeolic capital

The Aeolic order or Aeolian order was an early order of Classical architecture. It has a strong similarity to the better known Ionic order, but differs in the capital, where a palmette rises between the two outer volutes, rather than them being linked horizontally by a form at the top of the capital. Many examples also show simplified details compared to the Ionic.

== "Proto-Aeolic" capitals of Southern Levant ==
Decorated stone structures reminiscent of the Aeolic order, widely known as "Proto-Aeolic" or "Proto-Ionian" capitals, were especially common in the Southern Levant during the Iron Age. Capitals of this style were discovered in royal buildings and fortified city gates. They were built up for some ashlar masonries, an architectonic style reserved to Israelite royal structures. One of them is 110 x 28 x 60 cm of dimension and also differs from the canon for its ornamental details, showing a triangular shape in the center as the point of juncture of the capital volutes.

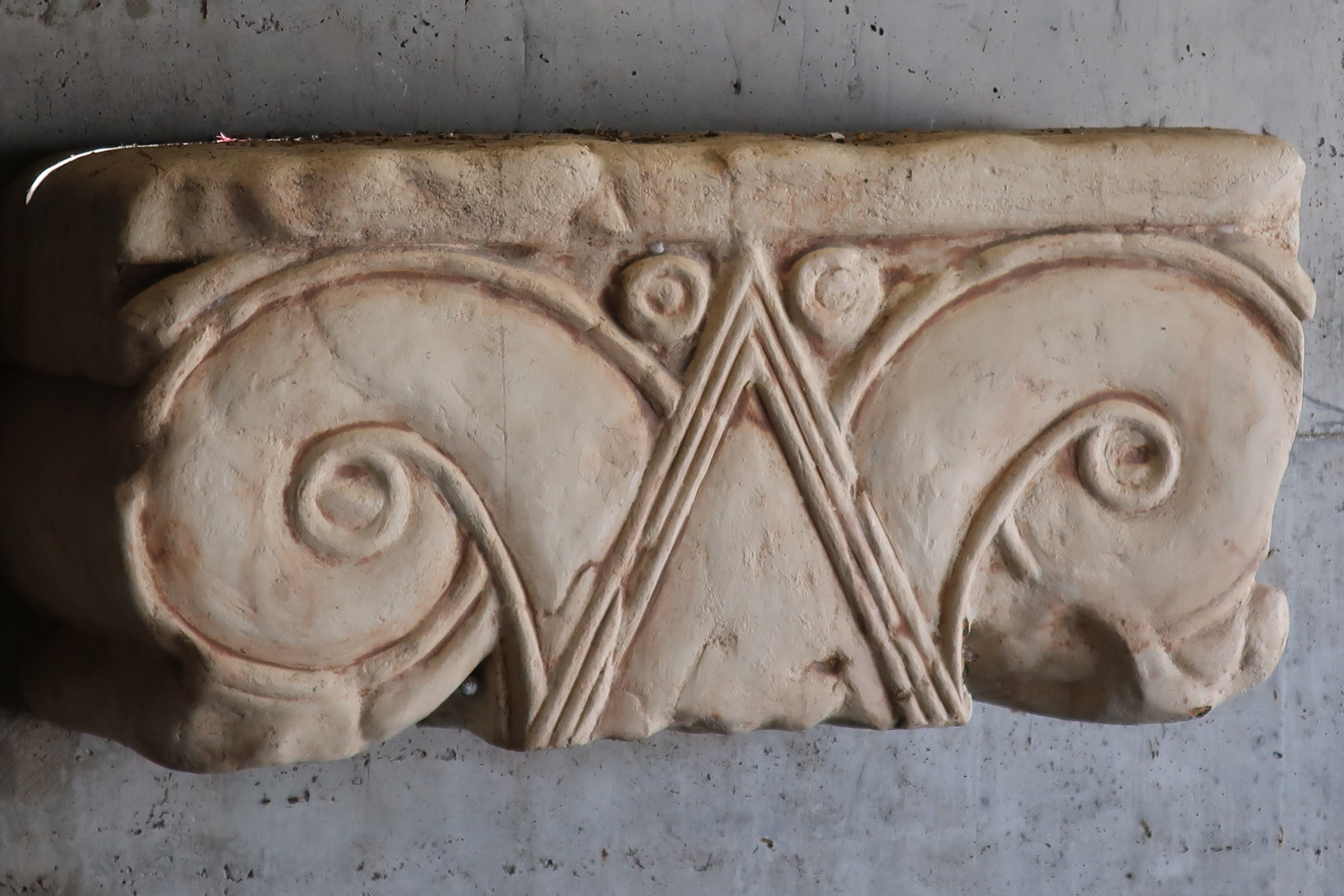
Proto-Aeolic capital unearthed in the City of David, Jerusalem

Proto-Aeolic capitals were unearthed in sites in modern-day Israel and in the West Bank: 27 capitals were discovered in sites belonging to the northern Kingdom of Israel, including Hazor, Megiddo, Dan, and Samaria, and on Mount Gerizim. 11 additional structures were discovered at archeological sites associated with the Kingdom of Judah, including the City of David, Ramat Rachel and in the 'Ain Joweizeh spring, near Al-Walaja. Proto-Aeolic capitals have also been found at archeological sites in modern-day Jordan: 6 items have been found at sites associated with the kingdom of Moab. Fragments of another capital were found in the Amman Citadel, the site of ancient Rabbath Ammon, capital of the Ammonites. The capitals originating in the Kingdom of Israel date to the days of the reign of Omri in the 9th century BCE, whilst the capitals associated with Judah, Ammon and Moab date to the end of the 8th century or the beginning of the 7th century BCE.

Less publicised are two findings of Proto-Aeolic capital fragments from Phoenician contexts in Spain, one of them from the Phoenician settlement at Cerro del Villar, Andalusia. For lack of archaeological context, this volute fragment's age had to be estimated based on the site's habitation timespan, i.e. "between the first half of the eighth century and the first quarter of the sixth century" BCE.

The more appropriate and neutral name "Iron Age volute capitals from the Levant" has been offered. The connection to the Aeolic order, which they precede, is rather complex and probably based on a general use of palm-tree decoration throughout the Ancient Near East.

== Aeolic order of Asia Minor ==
The Aeolic form developed in northwestern Asia Minor, out of Syrian and Phoenician capitals. It is also seen in some temples in Sicily, and is named from the Aeolian colonies of northwestern Asia Minor. The earliest surviving examples of the Aeolic order are contemporary with the emergence of the Ionic and Doric orders in the 6th century BC. Some authorities have suggested that the Ionic style represents a development of the Aeolic, but others disagree.

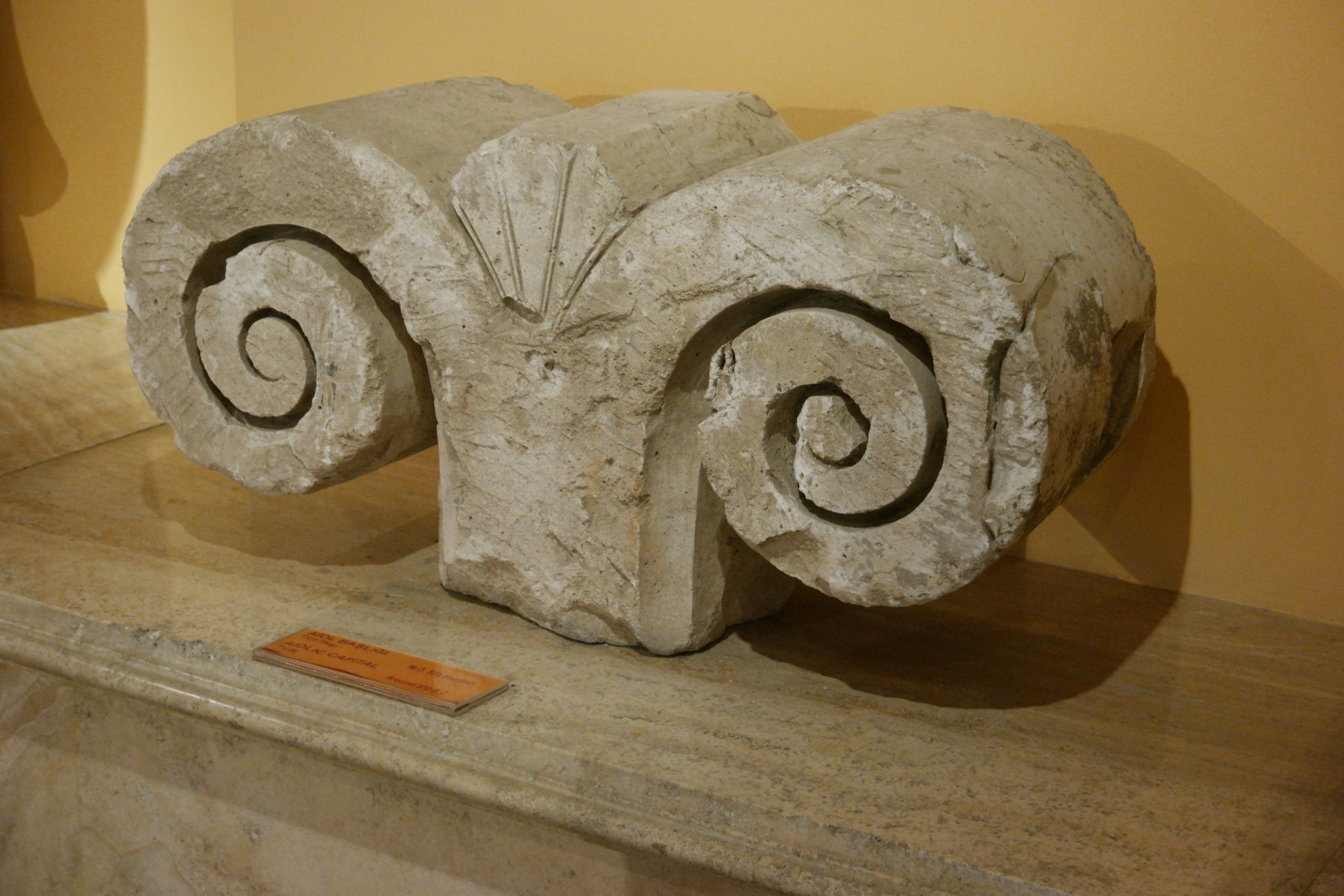
Aeolic capital from the Temple of Athena in Old Smyrna

The Aeolic order fell out of use at the end of the Archaic Period.

== Other associated forms ==
Some Etruscan tombs show a similar capital, with two large volutes that do not lie flat, but no palmette in the centre as in the Tomb of the Reliefs.

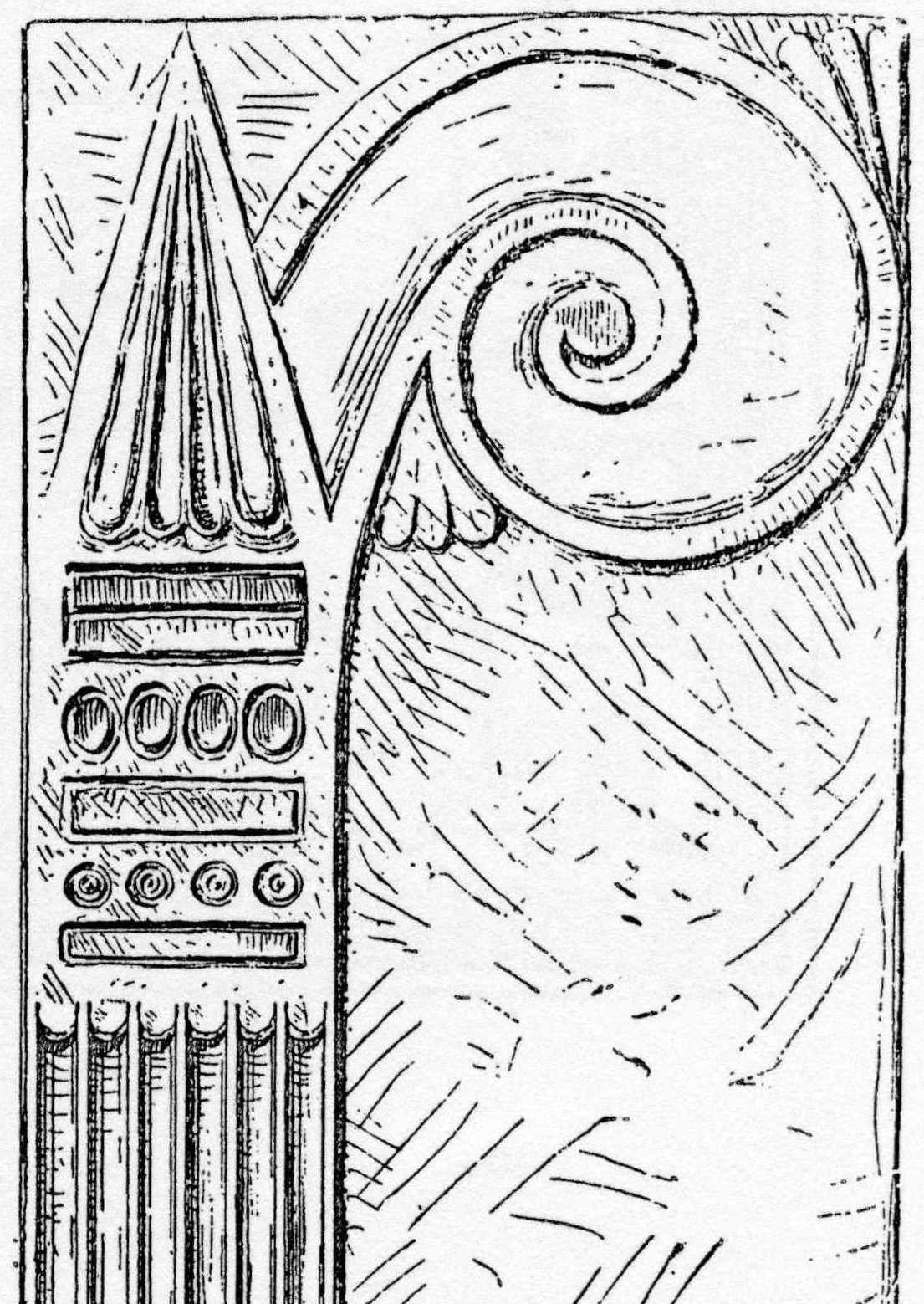
Aeolic column with half-capital, in the Bardo National Museum from Tunis (Tunisia)

== See also ==
- Aeolic Greek
- Architecture of ancient Israel
