= Architecture of ancient Israel =

Iron Age architectural style of Israel and Judah

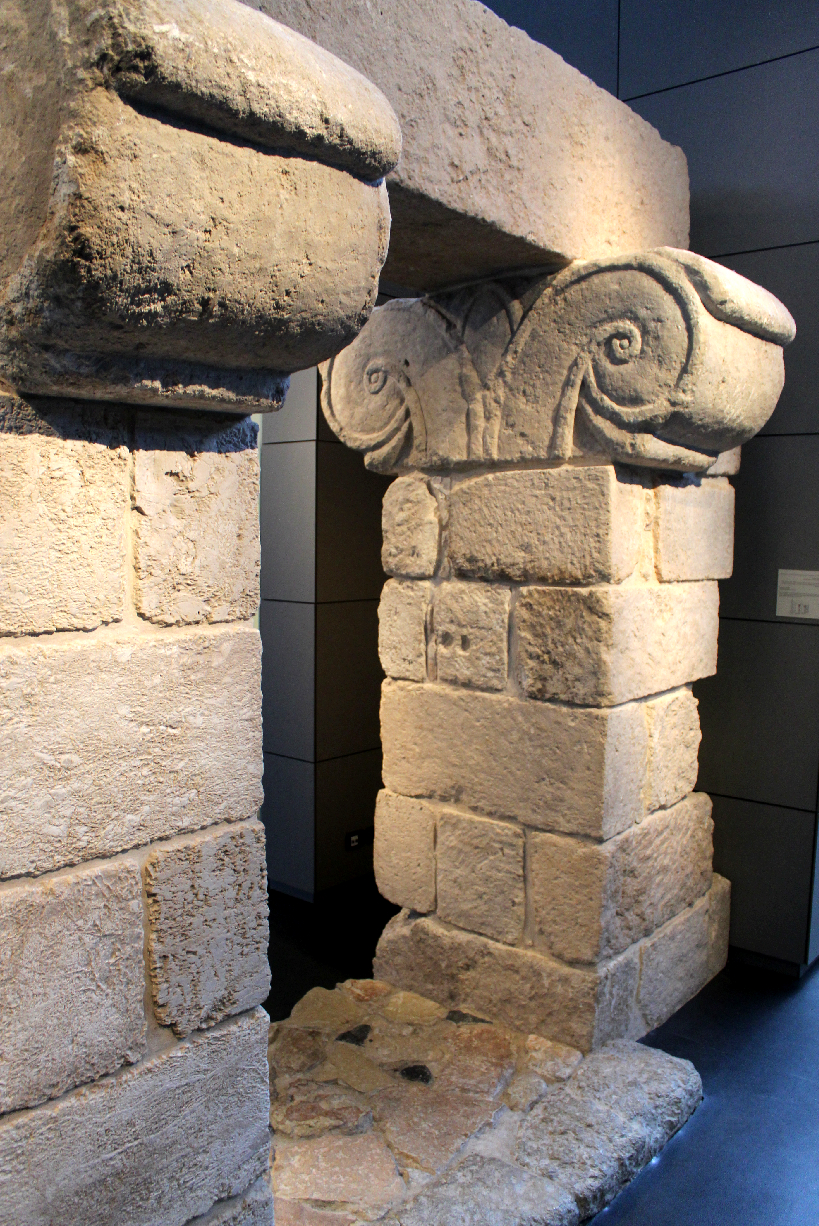
Gate from Hazor's royal fort with proto-Aeolic capitals, dating to the time of Ahab, 9th century BCE

The domestic architecture of ancient Israel (c. 1200–587/6 BCE) is best defined by the four-room house: a standardized plan featuring three longitudinal rooms and one broad room, which served as a spatial response to both agrarian requirements and the socio-religious necessity of ritual boundaries.

The emergence of the kingdoms of Israel and Judah during the 10th and 9th centuries BCE introduced a refined technical vocabulary, characterized by the implementation of ashlar masonry and proto-Aeolic capitals as visual signifiers of royal authority. This capital style, originating in ancient Israel, was later adopted by the Neo-Assyrian Empire following its 8th-century conquest of the northern kingdom, a period that conversely saw the importation of the Assyrian "Open-Courtyard Building" into the local architectural repertoire.

Multiple types of burial caves are attested in ancient Israel, including cave, chamber, and bench tombs, which were frequently clustered in rock outcrops near settlements. The funerary architecture is perhaps best defined by the bench tomb, in which horizontal resting surfaces were hewn from bedrock and supplemented by bone repositories for secondary burials. These tombs functioned as stone skeuomorphs of the contemporary four-room house, translating domestic details into a funerary context.

== Background ==
=== Material ===
Construction techniques in Israel and Judah represented an evolution of long-standing Levantine traditions, which originated with the transition to permanent architecture during the Neolithic period. The selection of materials was dictated by geography: in the central highlands, stone was the primary resource for wall construction. In the plains and valleys, where stone was less abundant, mudbrick was the standard building material. In comparison to domestic structures, public buildings are characterized by greater wall thickness, superior flooring quality, and the frequent utilization of ashlar masonry. Cut blocks of stone were utilized not only for their superior stability but also as a means to project power. The walls were typically constructed of rectangular blocks of hard stone laid as alternating headers and stretchers. Surface finishes fluctuated between uniform and erratic; in several cases, a central projection remained visible.

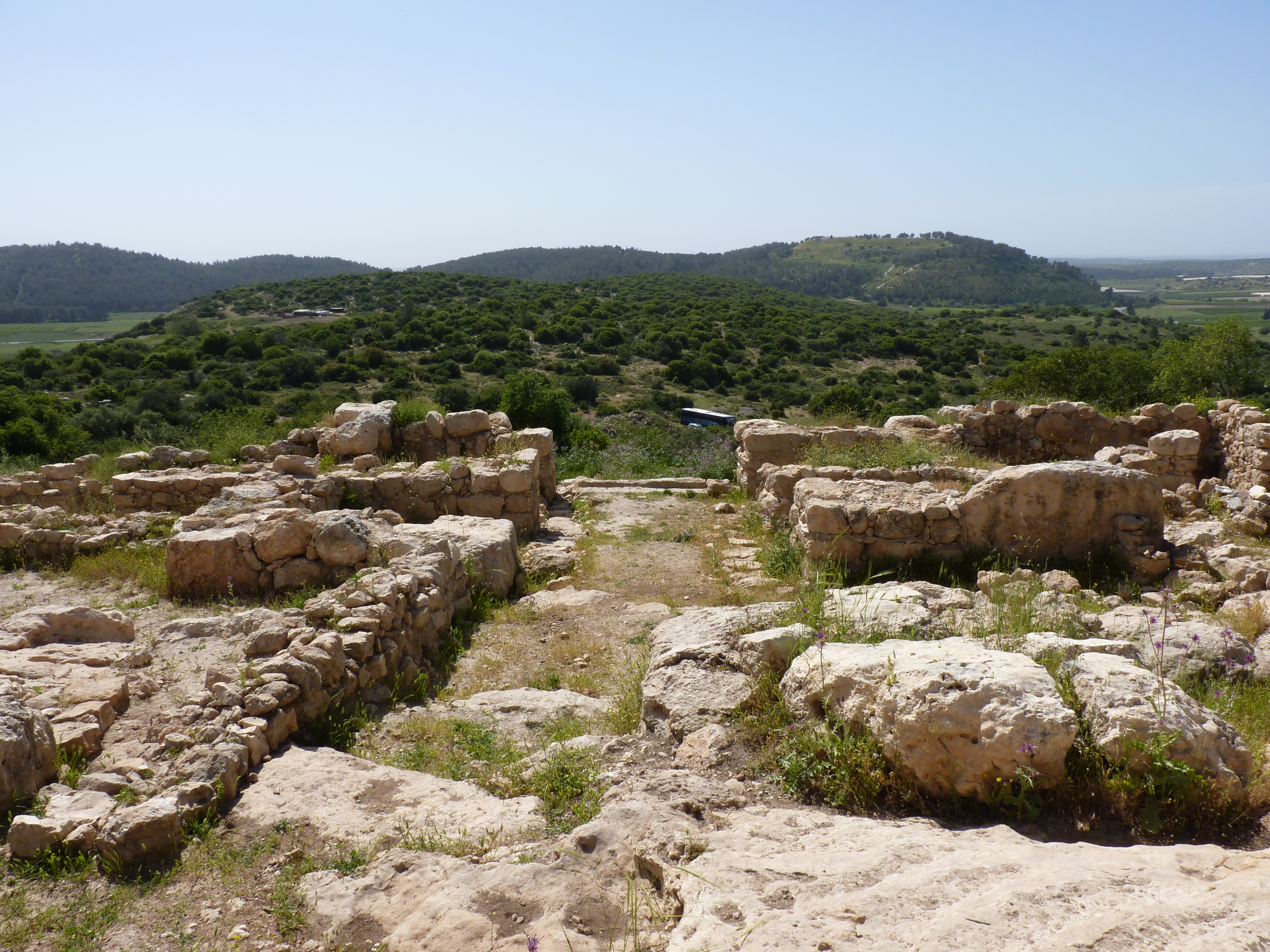
The 10th-century BCE gate at Khirbet Qeiyafa, featuring the first usage of proto-ashlars in ancient Israel

In the early Iron Age, fieldstones were the most common building material, but starting during the 10th century BCE, a trend toward using hewn and ashlar (finely carved) stone emerged. The earliest application of ashlars, or 'proto-ashlars', in Israelite architecture is evidenced in the western gate of the 10th-century fortified settlement at Khirbet Qeiyafa.

=== Walls and roofs ===
Walls were constructed using either an all-stone method or a hybrid style where mudbricks were laid atop courses of stone to prevent damage from moisture and runoff. Builders in the central highlands primarily used a "header" technique where oblong fieldstones were laid pointing toward the wall's interior to make sure the structural load remained centered and stable. In the plains and valleys where stone was less common, mudbricks were the standard material. They were made from a mixture of earth, straw, and water, and brought benefits such as improved insulation and resistance to tremors.

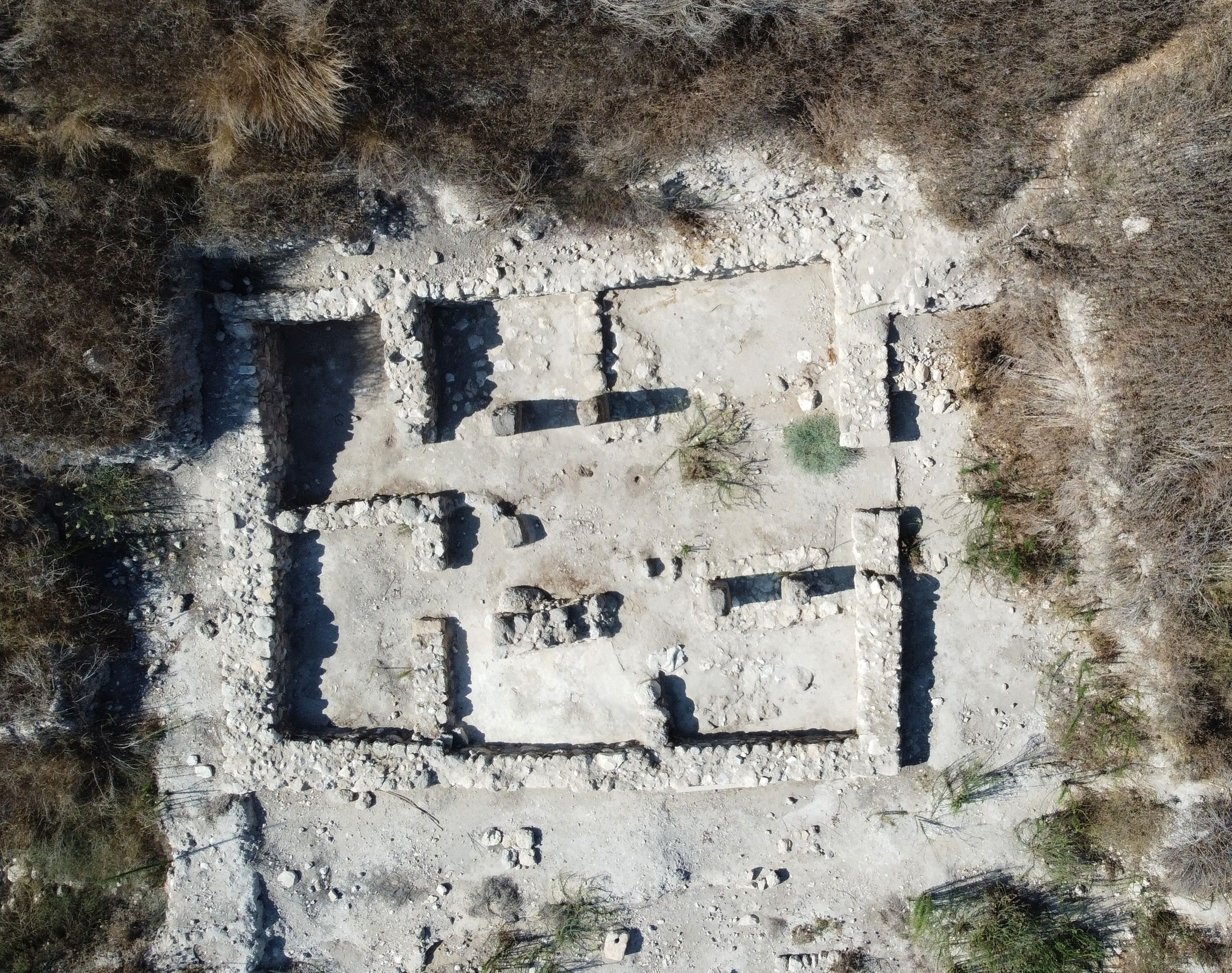
Stone foundations of a four-room house at Gezer

Roofs were typically flat, and served as functional workspaces or as venues for social and religious practices as attested in multiple passages in the Hebrew Bible. They were constructed by laying wooden beams across the tops of walls, followed by a layer of reeds and twigs to support several applications of mud or chalk plaster. This method usually incorporated a slight incline for drainage. Typically, these surfaces were bordered by a parapet to prevent accidental falls; this feature appears as a commandment in the Torah (Deuteronomy 22:8): "When you build a new house, you shall make a parapet for your roof, so that you do not bring bloodguilt on your house if anyone should fall from it."

=== Capitals ===
A prominent feature of the monumental architecture of the kingdoms of Israel and Judah is the proto-Aeolic capital, also known as "volute capitals" or timorah capitals. These stone columns feature a stylized palm motif which, although widespread across the ancient Near East, appears in this architectural context as a distinctive regional development. Although neighboring polities in the southern Levant also adopted them, their use is most strongly associated with Israelite architecture. Archaeologist Oded Lipschits described them as "one of the main original architectural styles that evolved in ancient Israel."

The stylized palm motif on the capital consists of a central triangular element flanked by symmetrical spiral volutes, often accompanied by leaf-like ornamental details. The palm itself is a long-standing symbol in the artistic traditions of Mesopotamia and the Levant, where palm imagery appears as early as the third millennium BCE. Earlier scholarship attributed the design to influences from Egypt or Cyprus; however, archaeological evidence from the southern Levant predates comparable examples in those regions by several centuries.

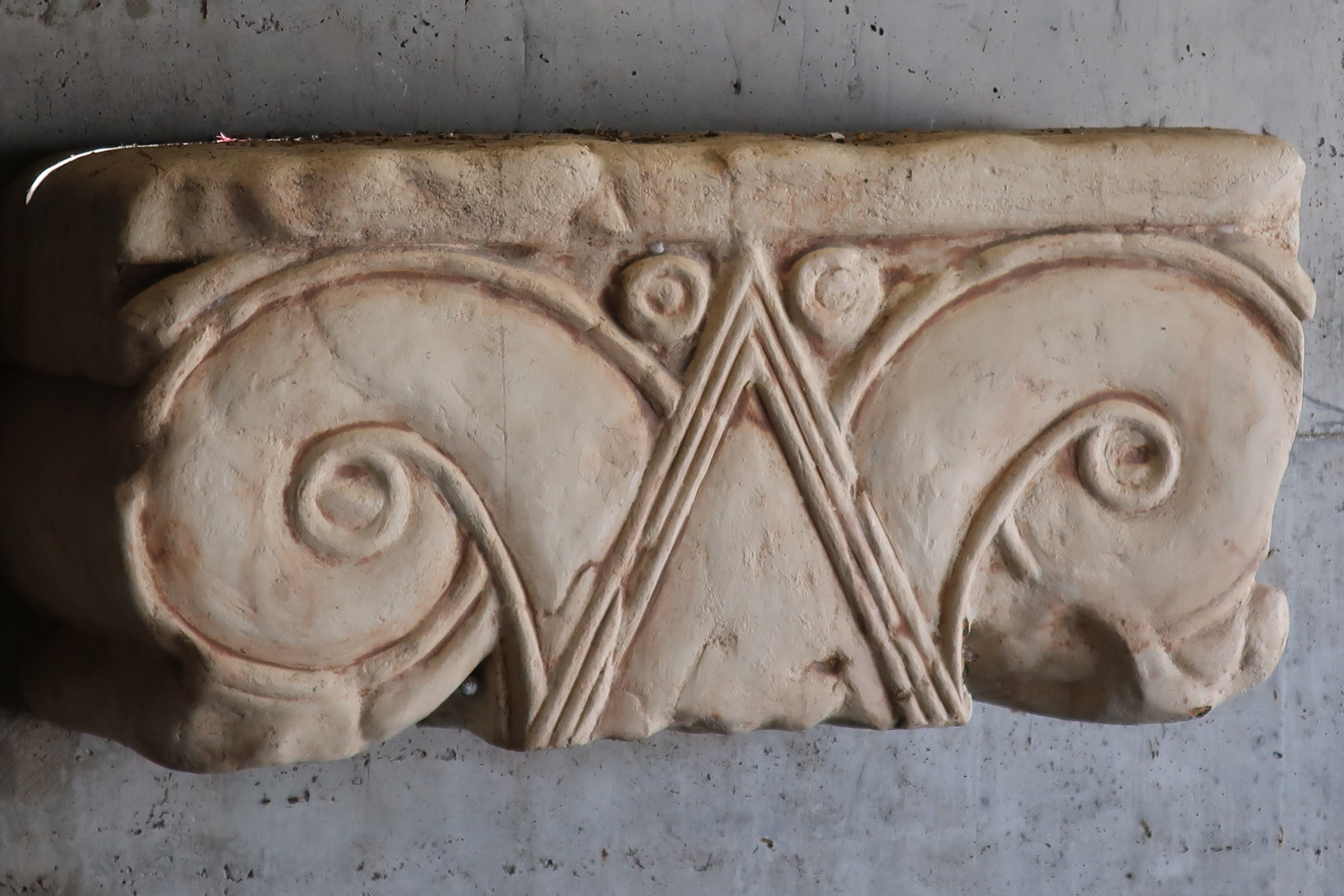
Proto-Aeolic capital unearthed in the City of David, Jerusalem

Proto-Aeolic capitals appear exclusively in buildings constructed with high-quality ashlar masonry. This construction technique distinguishes Israelite royal architecture from the orthostat-based systems typical of North Syrian cultures. Most served as structural elements for engaged pillars within walls, though bifacial examples were designed for free-standing supports. Archaeologist Yigal Shiloh argued that the label "Proto-Aeolic" is misleading because it implies a developmental link with the later Greek style known as the Aeolic order. He instead proposed the terms "Israelite Capital" or timorah (

Biblical Hebrew: תִּמֹרָה palmetto), the latter referencing the biblical word for palm-shaped decorations in Solomon's Temple. Linguistic evidence supports this connection, as timorah in associated in ancient texts with architectural elements such as pillars and door jambs in monumental buildings.

Oded Lipschits rejected these terms, arguing that the biblical timorah refers to engravings on walls and doors rather than to stone capitals, and that the same capitals appear in neighboring non-Israelite polities. He therefore adopts another term, 'volute capital', following the terminology proposed by A. Ciaska.

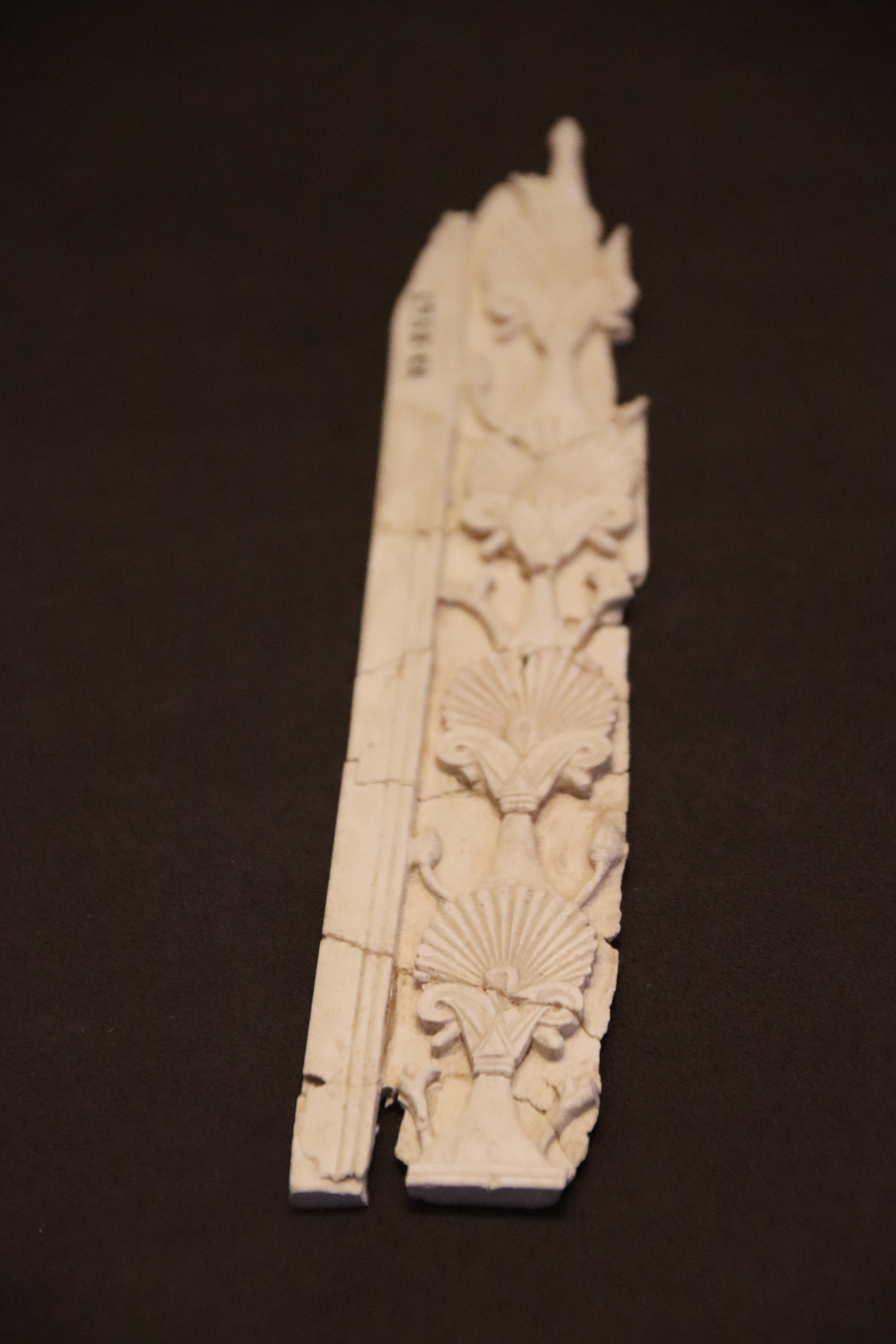
Miniature volute capitals depicted on an ivory piece from Samaria

A total of 45 proto-Aeolic capitals have been discovered. The largest concentration is in the kingdom of Israel, where 27 were found at administrative centers such as Hazor, Megiddo, Dan, Samaria, and the Mount Gerizim Temple. These represent the earliest phase, dating to either the 10th century BCE or the 9th century BCE during the Omride dynasty, and predate examples from Phoenician contexts. Within Judah, 11 capitals have been uncovered at the City of David, Ramat Rachel, and the 'Ain Joweizeh spring near Al-Walaja. They date mainly to the late 8th–early 7th centuries BCE, and suggest, according to Lipschits, a gradual southward diffusion. Nevertheless, seal impressions on clay bullae from a rock-cut pool near Jerusalem's Gihon Spring, dated from the late 9th and early 8th century BCE, depict the volute capital motif, indicating its presence in Judah earlier than a strictly 7th-century date would allow. East of the Jordan, six capitals come from Moabite sites (Khirbet el-Mudeibi' and 'Ain-Sara), and Ammon is represented by fragments of a single capital from the Amman Citadel (ancient Rabbath Ammon). Like the Judahite examples, these date to the late 8th–early 7th centuries BCE. The capitals from Judah and Moab are of a distinctive southern variant, featuring a triangular element formed by recessed parallel lines at the center, with small round incisions on either side of the apex, which is absent from northern examples.

After the Assyrian conquest of Israel, architects impressed by this style incorporated it into Assyrian buildings, including Sargon's Palace in Dur-Sharrukin and Sennacherib's Palace in Nineveh. The same volute motif also appears at sites in Cyprus, including Salamis and Tamassos, where full size capitals have been found dating to the 8th and 7th centuries BCE.

The volute capital motif also appears in a miniaturized form on clay shrines and on carved ivories. A clay portable shrine found in a cultic context at Tell el-Far'ah North and incorporating the capital motif provides evidence that they functioned as structural column capitals rather than purely decorative wall attachments.

=== Other motifs ===
Recessed openings are a common architectural motif in ancient Israel, Judah, and the broader Iron Age Levant. However, the style is far older, appearing in Mesopotamian religious and royal structures as early as the 5th millennium BCE. Carved ivory objects from the royal compound at Samaria include depictions of a figure gazing through a recessed window frame, providing evidence for the motif's existence in the Northern Kingdom. Similar ivory plaques of the "woman at the window" motif were found in four other capitals in the broader Near East; alongside Samaria, they were discovered in Arslan Tash, Nimrud, Dur-Sharrukin, and Susa. The Assyrian ivories appear to be of Levantine origin, having reached Assyria as tribute or as spoils of war. In the southern region,a small limestone shrine and a basalt altar from Khirbet Qeiyafa demonstrate the use of recessed doorframes in a cultic context. This style is also attested centuries later in a rock-cut tomb at Iraq al-Amir, Jordan, built during the Persian period by the Tobiads, according to an accompanying inscription.

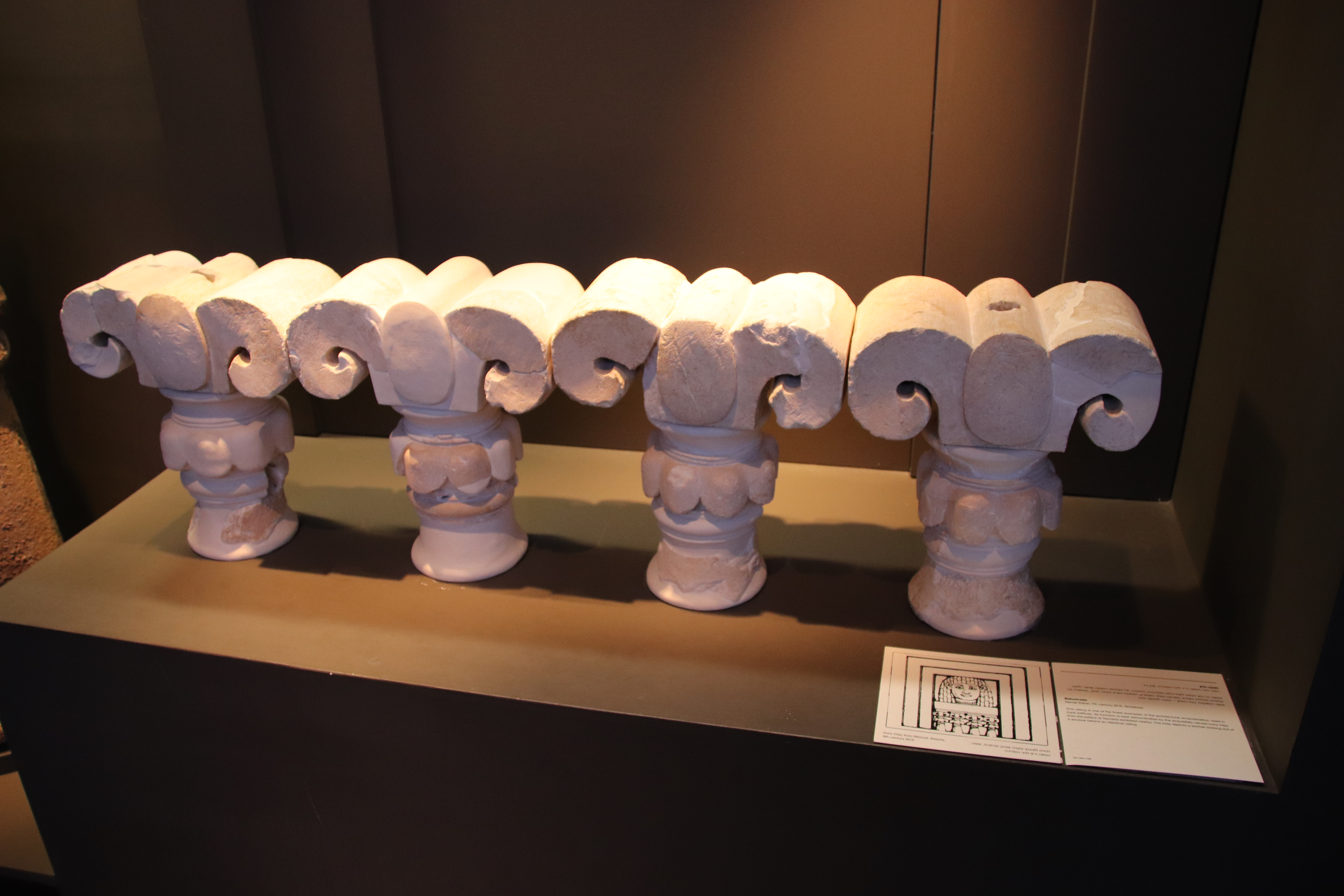
7th-century stone balustrade from Ramat Rachel

Also attested are window balustrades, appearing in royal buildings and featuring a three-part structure: a base, a middle section adorned with petal decoration, and a miniature volute capital crowning the top. The best-preserved example comes from Ramat Rachel, where excavations uncovered a section of a stone balustrade with its colonnettes and capitals, assigned to the 8th and 7th centuries BCE. Archaeological work in the City of David has also produced balustrade fragments, attesting to its use in Jerusalem.

== Domestic architecture ==
Construction techniques in Judah and Israel parallel those of other polities in the southern Levant. Yet, they feature distinctive room configurations that set them apart from their neighbors. Private homes typically followed a rectangular plan known as the Four-Room House (or "pillared house"), which featured three long rooms and one wide room. The middle section was often an open-air courtyard that provided access to the other rooms. This floor plan likely made it easier for families to follow ritual purity laws. It allowed individuals who were considered "impure", such as during menstruation or sexual relations, to move through the house without having to walk through the private living spaces of others.

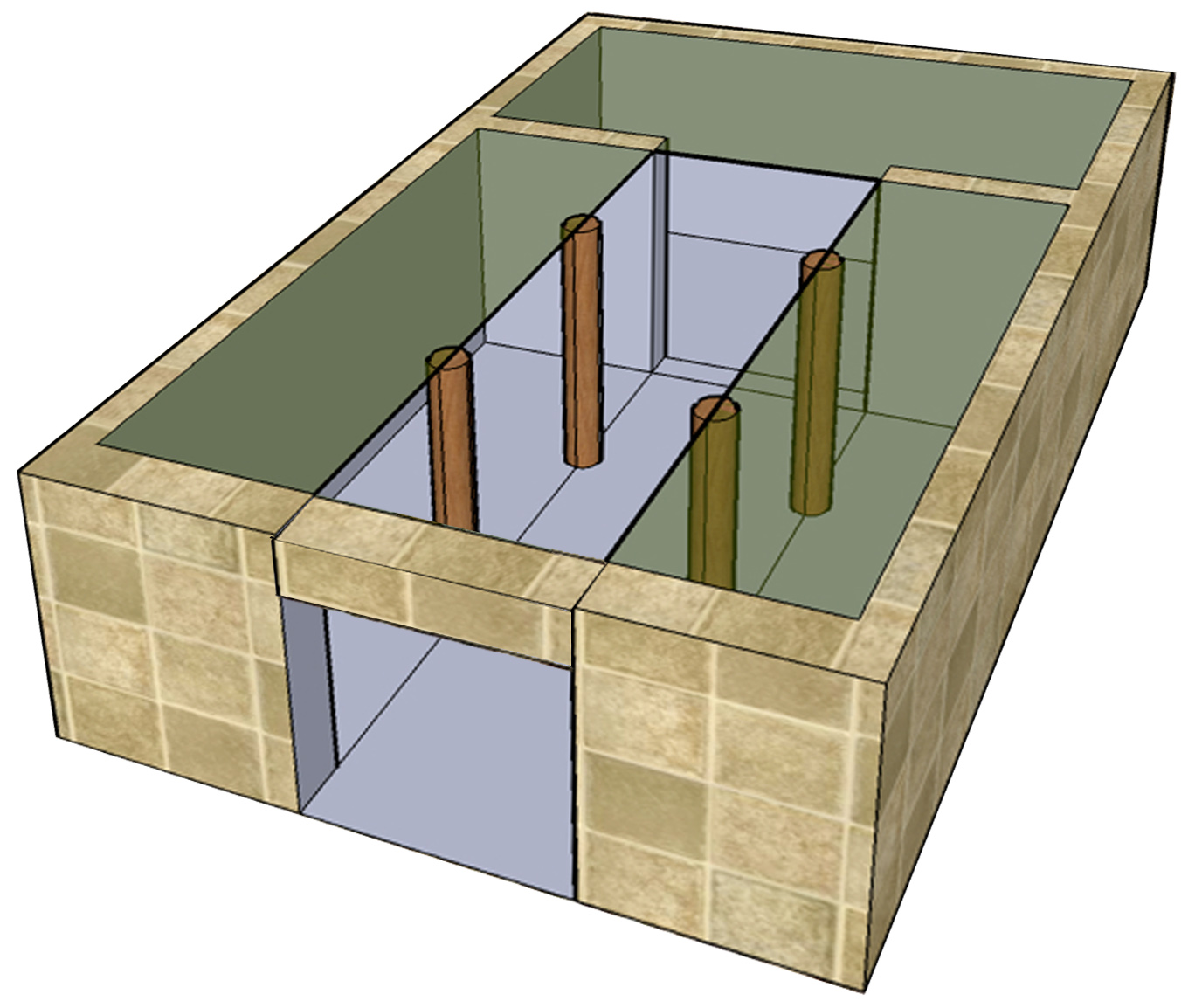
Plan of the four-room house

== Early public architecture (Iron Age I) ==
The presence of early monumental construction in Iron Age I Israel is archaeologically attested across several sites. Notable among these is the Mount Ebal site. Regardless of its identification as the altar described in Joshua 8, the site is widely interpreted as a cultic installation. Further examples include the partially preserved open-air sanctuary known as the 'Bull Site' in northern Samaria, as well as the tower at Giloh, south of Jerusalem. The biblical record also describes monumental sites for which there is no current archaeological evidence, yet which are chronologically attributed to the same era. These include the 'House of Micah' (possibly a cultic complex) and the twelve-stone memorial established by Joshua. According to Joshua 4, this monument was built of stones from the Jordan River to commemorate the miraculous parting of both the Jordan and the Reed Sea.

== Public architecture of Iron Age IIA ==
=== Appearance of ashlar masonry ===
The 10th century BCE marks the earliest appearance of ashlar masonry in ancient Israel, documented earliest in the gateways of Khirbet Qeiyafa and a few decades later in the fortifications of Megiddo, Gezer, and Hazor. Additional early examples of ashlars in Judah, dating from the 10th or 9th centuries BCE, were found in the towers of the Ophel in Jerusalem, as well as at Tel 'Eton and Ramat Rachel. Shortly afterwards, in the late 10th or early 9th century BCE, similar fortifications were erected at Lachish, alongside a podium interpreted as the foundational substructure for a palace dating. In Jerusalem, 10th-century monumental buildings and fortifications have been identified, including the Stepped Stone Structure and the Large Stone Structure, which both appear to have been established by the start of the Iron Age IIA.

=== Developments in religious structures ===
The most prominent religious building associated with Iron Age IIA in ancient Israel is Solomon's Temple, also known as the 'First Temple in Jerusalem'. The biblical account in 1 Kings 6–7 describes the Temple as a long room structure situated on a central symmetrical axis north of the royal palace. It was built with a due east-west orientation, featuring its primary entrance on the eastern side. The building's internal dimensions were 60 cubits long, 20 cubits wide, and 30 cubits high.

Surrounding the main structure were three stories of wooden side chambers supported by "narrowed rests" - receding tiers (migra'ot in Hebrew), which were stepped sections of the exterior wall designed to hold roof beams without anchoring them into the stone. The entrance was marked by two freestanding, hollow brass pillars named Boaz and Jachin, which served a symbolic rather than structural function.

The interior of the Temple began with the ulam, an introductory enclosure that was equal in width to the main hall and likely remained unroofed. Natural light was provided by specialized barred windows known as ḥalonei shqafim atumim. Within the rear of the main hall sat the Holy of Holies, or dvir, which was a wooden cube measuring 20 cubits on each side. This structure was installed as a separate fixture at floor level after the primary stone building was completed. Rather than featuring the animal iconography common in other regional temples, the interior was adorned with botanical motifs such as lilies, palm trees, and garlands intended to represent the Garden of Eden.

Because the prohibition of excavations at the Temple Mount has prevented the discovery of archaeological evidence, researchers have previously looked to Syria and Phoenicia for architectural parallels. Northern Syrian temples at Tell Tayinat and Ain Dara were once nearly unanimously accepted as models, yet David Shapira wrote that they differ from the biblical description in many fundamental features.

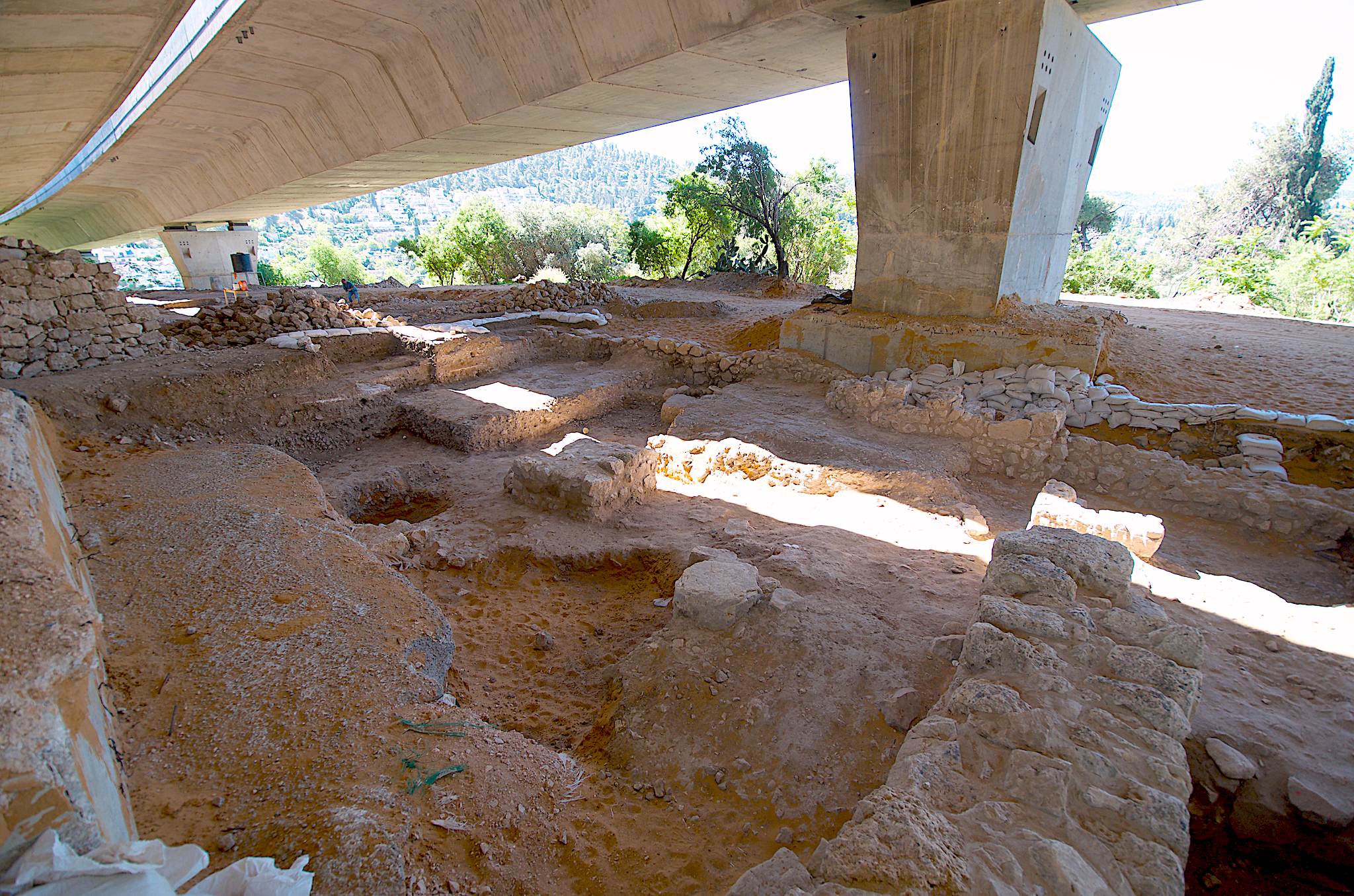
The Judahite Temple at Tel Motza

In 2012, a structure dating to the late 10th or early 9th century BCE was discovered at Tel Motza, located approximately 7 kilometers west of Jerusalem. Identified as a temple by its cultic assemblages and its similarity to the biblical account of Solomon's Temple, the Tel Motza temple is now regarded as the closest and only known true parallel to the First Temple in Jerusalem. Both structures follow a "long-room" plan consisting of a single main chamber built on an east-west axis with an eastern-facing entrance. The Tel Motza temple also featured two freestanding pillars at its entrance, mirroring the biblical description of Boaz and Jachin. While smaller in scale, the Tel Motza temple maintains the same 3:1 proportions as the Jerusalem Temple, indicating that the biblical measurements are technically grounded.

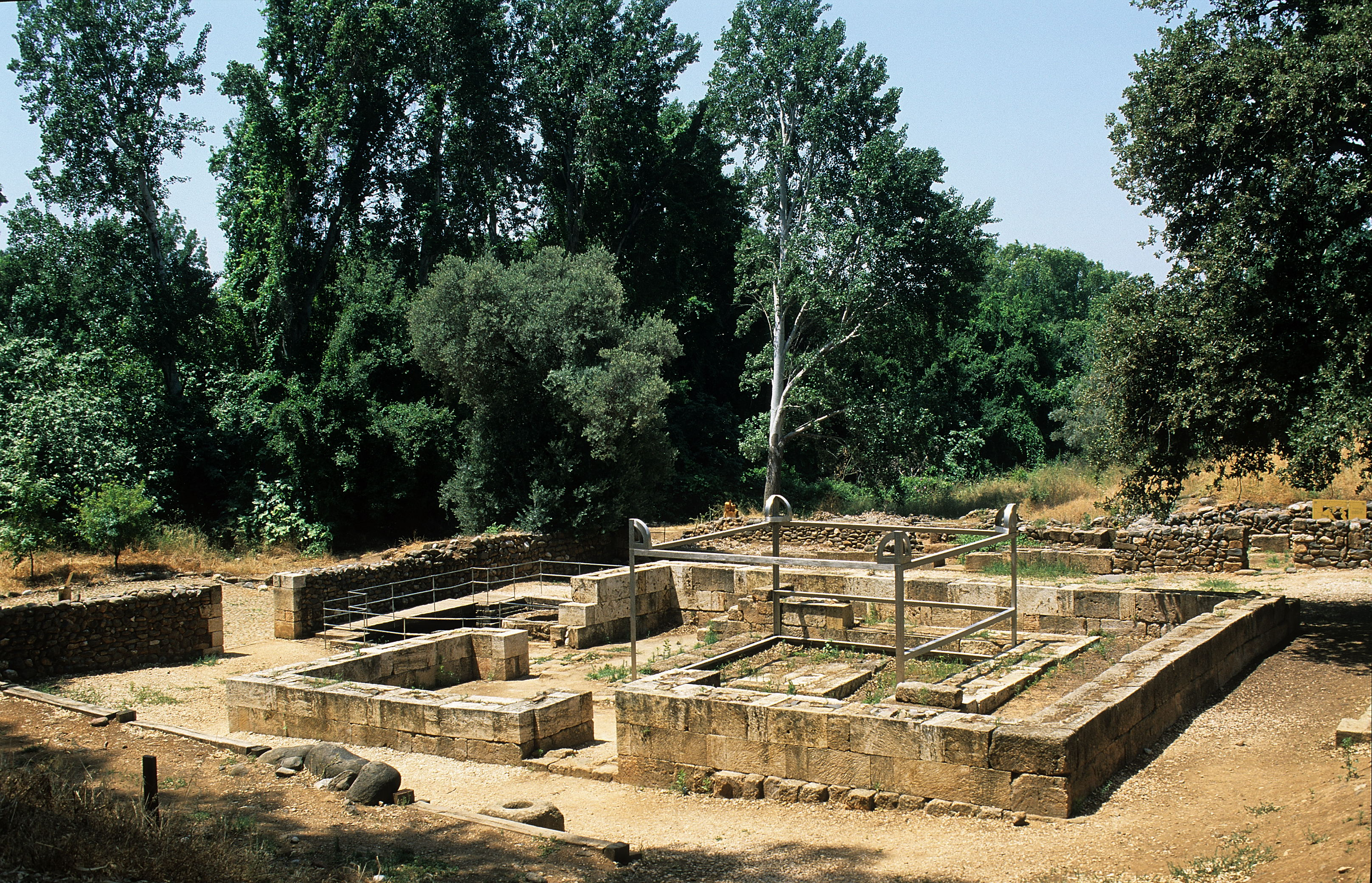
The Tel Dan sanctuary (Late Iron IIA)

Another documented example for a cultic site from this period is the Tel Dan sanctuary in northern Israel, which comprises a temple, altar, and associated courtyards. The site is identified with the golden calf sanctuary attributed to Jeroboam I in the biblical narrative; the second cultic center established by him, located at Bethel, has been identified northeast of the primary settlement.

== Public architecture of Iron Age IIB–C ==
=== Religious sites ===
During the 7th century BCE, the temple at Tel Motza was renovated. A temple was also built in Arad, and it is also assumed that one existed in Beersheba due to the discovery of horn fragments from a dismantled altar. According to the biblical narrative, other cultic sites existed throughout Judah before their late 8th-century dismantling in compliance with Hezekiah's religious reform.

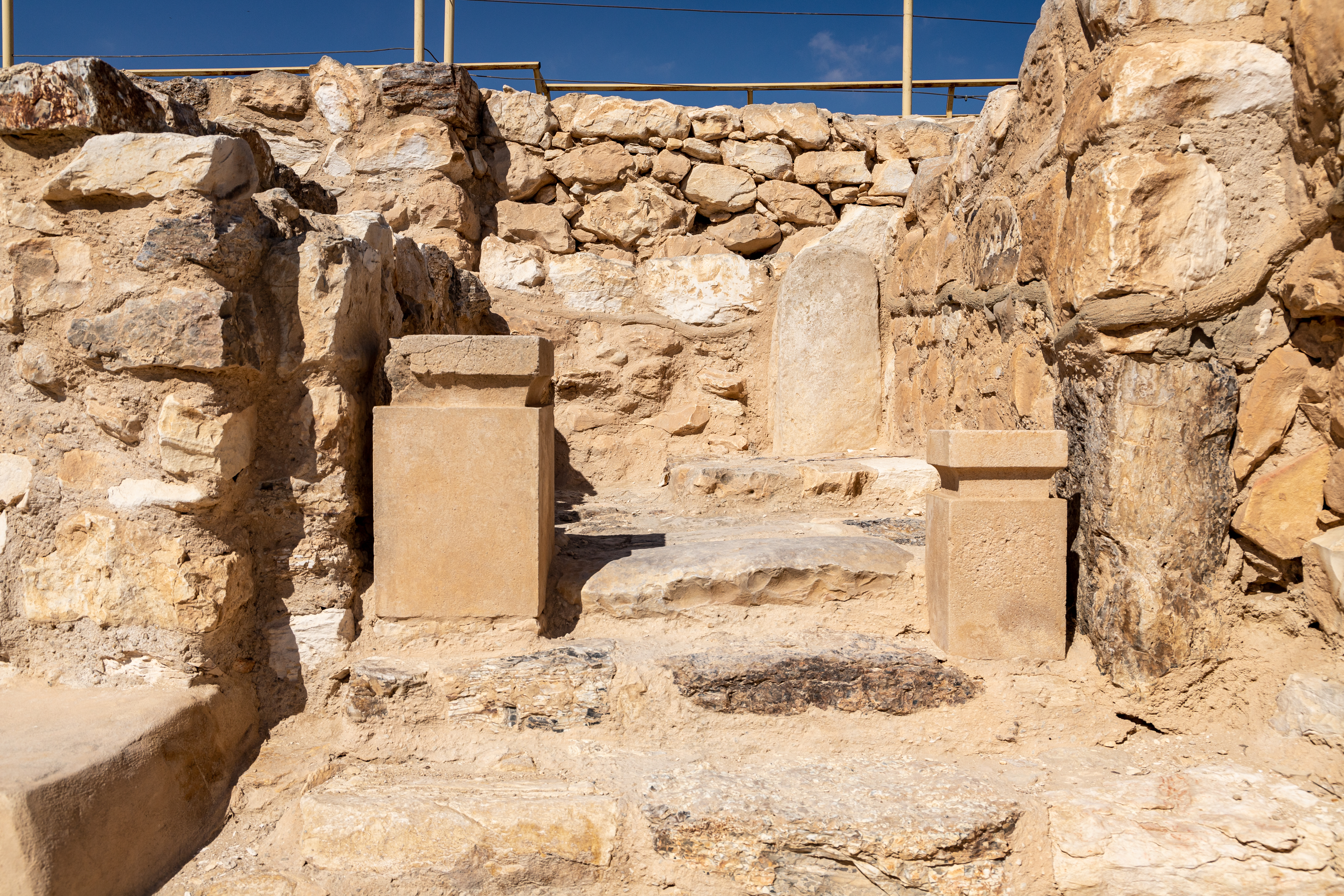
The Holy of Holies of the Arad fortress sanctuary, featuring two incense altars and a massebah (cultic stele). The structure was evidently decommissioned during the late 8th-century BCE cultic reforms of Hezekiah

=== Open-Courtyard Buildings ===
Following the expansion of the Neo-Assyrian Empire into the southern Levant, and the transformation of Judah into a vassal state, a new architectural form appears in the region during the 7th century BCE: the Open-Courtyard Building. This structure type is characterized by a large courtyard placed at its front, rather than enclosed within it. In the original style, part of imperial Assyrian architecture, this courtyard was surrounded by rooms on all four sides. However, in the local Judahite adaptation, the plan typically included only two or three wings of rooms bordering a disproportionately large courtyard, leaving one side open towards the exterior. This layout created a space that was semi-public in character, and could accommodate activities involving visitors, transportation, and storage.

Archaeological evidence for this building type has been identified at multiple locations in and around Jerusalem, dating mainly to the 7th century BCE. One example was excavated at Mamilla, west of Jerusalem's Old City, where a roughly 20 × 20 meter building contained a large courtyard bordered by two wings of rooms. The structure was associated with a dam and water-management installations, leading excavators to propose an administrative function. Its use continued into the Persian period. Another example is the so-called "Ashlar Building" on Jerusalem's southeastern ridge, the City of David. It is dated to the second half of the 7th century BCE. Additional examples have been uncovered at Khirbet er-Ras, a rural site southwest of Jerusalem, where several buildings with two flanking wings and large open courtyards were identified.

The type was also identified in Stratum III at Megiddo, a city reorganized as an Assyrian provincial center after the conquest of the northern kingdom of Israel. Continued use of the type is attested into the Persian period, including in the Beth Shemesh area.

== Fortifications ==
=== Casemate walls ===
A characteristic fortification system in ancient Israel and Judah is the "casemate wall", a fortification line consisting of "double walls with dividing walls between them." The casemate wall developed gradually during the 12th and 11th centuries BCE out of earlier settlement patterns in which residential four-room houses were arranged in an encircling belt around the site. The configuration created a continuous outer line that functioned as a defensive perimeter and foreshadows the later casemate wall system. By the 10th century BCE, the casemate wall had become a fully developed architectural unit, consisting of double parallel walls with internal diving walls. In many cases, this system did not exist as a freestanding fortification but was integrated into the surrounding ring of buildings enclosing the settlement.

The mature casemate fortification system comprised three standardized components: the casemate city wall itself, a belt of residential houses abutting the wall from the interior, and a peripheral road running along the houses' outer face. This tripartite plan became the dominant urban design principle throughout the Iron Age and appeared continuously from the 12th century BCE through the destruction of Judah in the 6th century BCE. The persistence of this configuration across centuries and diverse site types demonstrates that it "was not a random configuration but a customary pattern characteristic of planning principles in many types of Israelite cities."

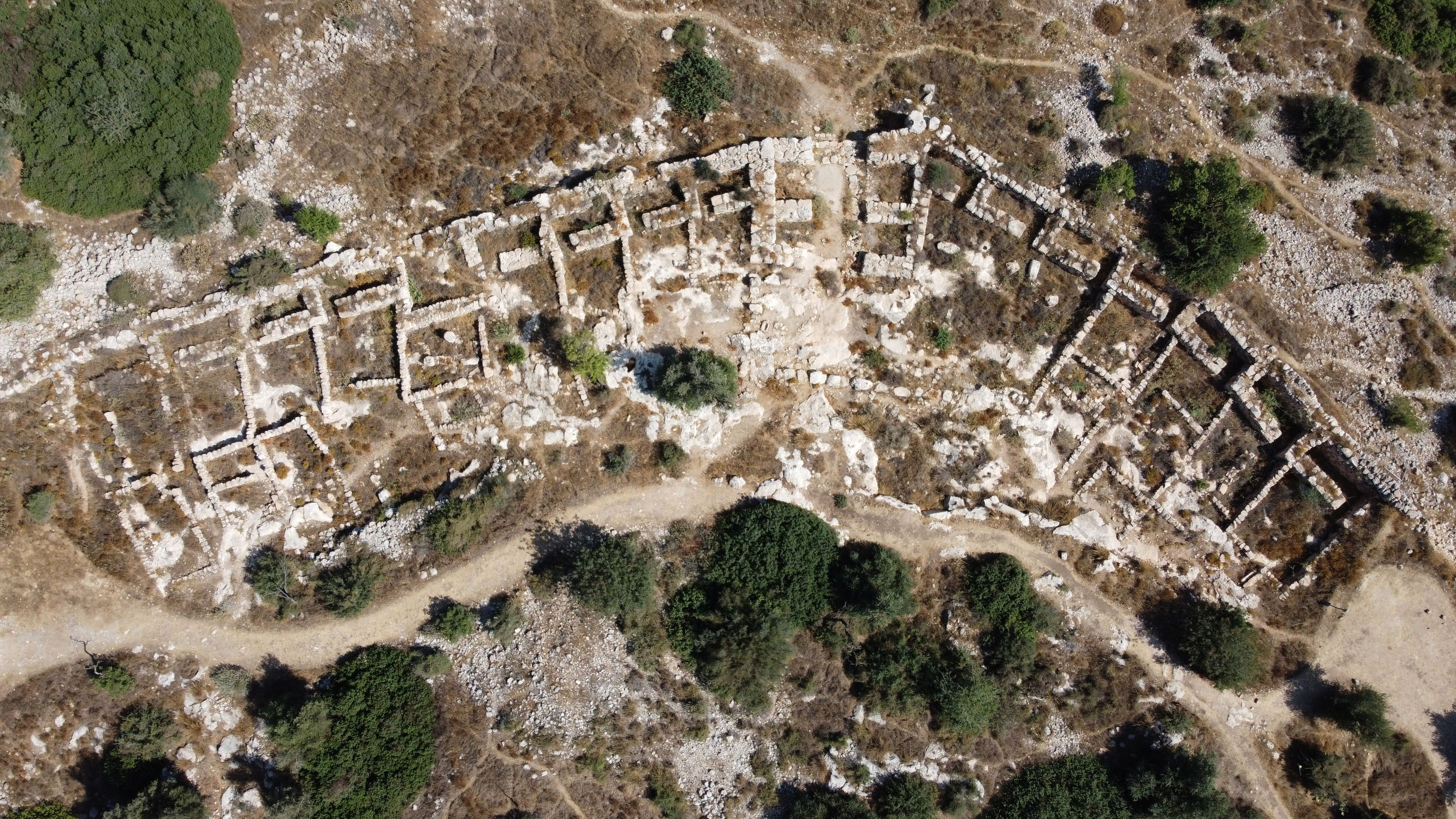
The fortifications of Khirbet Qeiyafa, showing a casemate wall lined with a belt of houses that incorporated the casemates as rear rooms

In Judah, the earliest fortified cities of the early 10th century BCE exemplified this architectural style. Khirbet Qeiyafa, Beth Shemesh, Tell en-Nasbeh (possibly Mizpah in Benjamin), and Khirbet ed-Dawwara, each featured a casemate wall lined with a belt of houses that incorporated the casemates as rear rooms. The casemates' openings were oriented away from the city gates as part of their planning. These settlements were positioned alongside key paths to the kingdom's center: Khirbet Qeiyafa guarded the Valley of Elah, Beth Shemesh controlled the Soreq Valley, and Tell en-Nasbeh commanded the northern approach to Jerusalem. In the second half of the 10th century BCE, Lachish was too fortified, employing a solid stone wall instead of the casemate architecture, yet maintaining the same underlying planning principle of a peripheral belt of structures abutting the fortification line.

In northern Israel, varied approaches to casemate fortifications are attested, influenced by the status and function of their respective sites. In major royal centers such as Megiddo and Hazor, large palaces and administrative buildings were sometimes incorporated directly into the casemate wall itself. In other important centers, such as Samaria and certain areas of Hazor, the casemate wall appears as an independent fortification separate from the residential structures within the city. By contrast, in provincial towns throughout Iron Age II, the prevailing pattern remained the integration of residential buildings and casemate walls into a single encircling defensive belt.

=== Forts ===
Rectilinear fortresses first appear in Judah during the late Iron Age IIA, in places such as Tel Arad. By the late 8th century BCE, they became more common as a result of the conflict between Judah and Edom over the trade routes of the Negev and Arabah.

== Funerary architecture ==
Multiple kinds of burial caves are attested, including cave, chamber, and bench tombs. They were often clustered in rock outcrops near settlements. Cave Tombs used and enlarged natural fissures in the rock. Chamber Tombs, were created by shaping natural caves or fissures into quadrilateral rooms. Bench Tombs, featuring waist-high benches carved along the periphery, are the most commonly attested. Less common forms included jar burials (found at Beth Shemesh) and pit graves (found at Jerusalem and Lachish). According to Kyle E. Keimer, these tombs "represent Israel's connection to the land and to earlier generations." Matthew Suriano argued that tombs in Israel and Judah serve as material expressions of their conceptualization of the land covenant.

The usage of natural caves or hand-carved rooms for family burials was a continuation of local Bronze Age traditions. The addition of waist-high stone benches first appeared in coastal and Shephelah tombs between the 14th and 12th centuries BCE. People living in the Judahite highlands likely adopted this bench tomb design from these coastal or Shephelah regions. Evidence of early bench tombs in the highlands has been found at Tel Halif, dating to the 10th and 9th centuries BCE. These early tombs were already stocked with household items such as bowls, jugs, and metal jewelry. From the 8th through the 6th century BCE, the architectural plan for these tombs remained remarkably standardized with no significant changes.

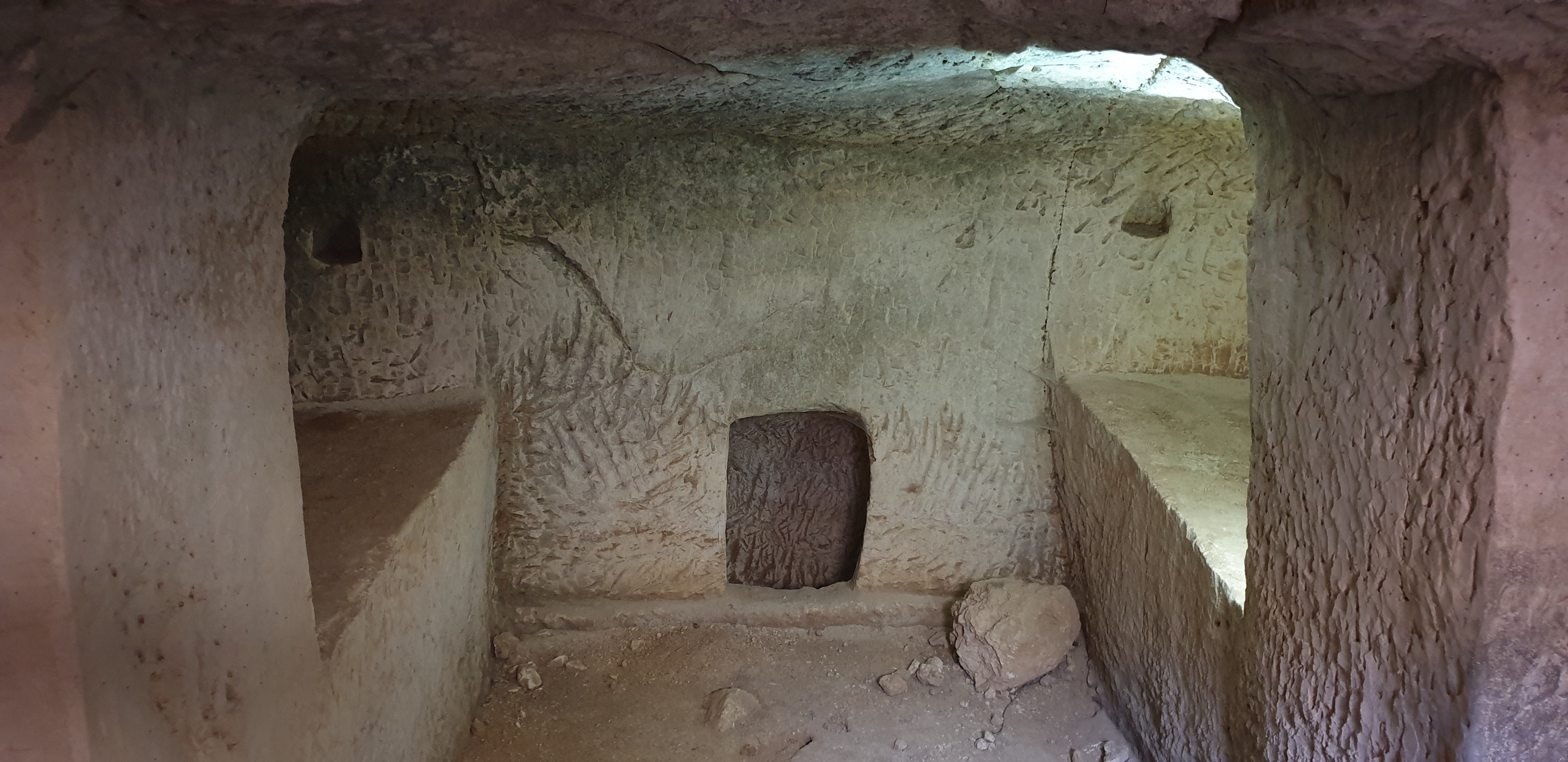
Bench tomb at Tel 'Eton, Judah

Bench tombs were accessed through a small square or rectangular opening, which was typically sealed with a large stone. The interior usually consisted of a single chamber, roughly 3–5 meters long and 2.5–3.5 meters wide. Upon entering, steps often led down to a floor flanked by one to three waist-high stone benches. By the 8th century BCE at the latest, these tombs also featured a bone repository: a pit carved into the floor or beneath a bench. This space held the bones and grave goods of previous occupants to make room for new burials. Small niches were occasionally carved into the walls to hold oil lamps. In the southern regions and the Shephelah, benches were sometimes set into recessed niches with arched ceilings, a design that maximized central floor space.

Judahite funerary architecture closely mirrored the layout of contemporary homes. The layout of the tomb chambers often replicated the four-room house. Elite tombs found in Jerusalem, Gibeon, and Judeidah, served as "stone skeuomorphs": stone versions of luxury residences. They featured details typically found in domestic architecture, including antechambers, supplemental rooms, decorative carvings such as faux cornices and wall paneling, and carved door frames and entry stairs.

The most sophisticated examples are found in Judah's capital, Jerusalem. The Silwan necropolis, located east of the ancient city, featured elaborately carved facades visible from royal and cultic buildings. Some were designed for single individuals or couples rather than family collectives, featuring stone sarcophagi and carved headrests. The most elaborate examples featured a dromos (entrance passage) or a carved facade opening into a vestibule providing access to multiple chambers. Facades and interior walls often bore inscriptions naming the deceased; one famous example is the "Royal Steward inscription", which identifies a "royal steward... who is over the house".

== See also ==
- Architecture of Israel (modern)
- Architecture of Mesopotamia
- Architecture of Urartu
- Herodian architecture

== Bibliography ==
- Avraham, Assaf (2018). "Ancient Building Techniques: A Brief Overview". In Farber, Zev I.; Wright, Jacob L. (eds.). Archaeology and History of Eighth-Century Judah (PDF). SBL Press. pp. 299–306.
- Bloch-Smith, Elizabeth (2018). "Death and Burial in Eighth-Century Judah". In Farber, Zev I.; Wright, Jacob L. (eds.). Archaeology and History of Eighth-Century Judah (PDF). SBL Press. pp. 365–378.
- Gadot, Yuval; Bocher, Efrat (2018). "The Introduction of the Open-Courtyard Building to the Jerusalem Landscape and Judean-Assyrian Interaction". In Farber, Zev I.; Wright, Jacob L. (eds.). Archaeology and History of Eighth-Century Judah (PDF). SBL Press. pp. 205–228.
- Garfinkel, Yosef (2023). "Early City Planning in the Kingdom of Judah: Khirbet Qeiyafa, Beth Shemesh 4, Tell en-Nasbeh, Khirbet ed-Dawwara, and Lachish". Jerusalem Journal of Archaeology. 4: 87–107. doi:10.52486/01.00004.4.
- Keimer, Kyle H. (2022). "Monuments, Monumental Architecture, and Monumentality in Ancient Israel". The Ancient Israelite World. London: Routledge. pp. 142–155. doi:10.4324/9780367815691-11. ISBN 978-0-367-81569-1.
- Lipschits, Oded (2011-07-21). "The Origin and Date of the Volute Capitals from the Levant". The Fire Signals of Lachish. Penn State University Press. pp. 203–226. doi:10.5325/j.ctv1bxh0bf.18. ISBN 9781575066295.
- Mumcuoglu, Madeleine; Garfinkel, Yosef (2021). "Royal Architecture in the Iron Age Levant". Jerusalem Journal of Archaeology. 1: 450–481. doi:10.52486/01.00001.20 (inactive 29 April 2026).
- Shapira, David (2018). "The Moza Temple and Solomon's Temple" (PDF). Bibliotheca Orientalis. 75 (1): 25–48.
- Shiloh, Yigal (1977). "The Proto-Aeolic Capital—The Israelite 'Timorah' (Palmette) Capital". Palestine Exploration Quarterly. 109 (1): 39–52. doi:10.1179/peq.1977.109.1.39. eISSN 1743-1301. ISSN 0031-0328.
- Shiloh, Yigal (1987). "The Casemate Wall, the Four Room House, and Early Planning in the Israelite City". Bulletin of the American Schools of Oriental Research. 268 (268): 3–15. doi:10.2307/1356991. JSTOR 1356991 – via JSTOR.
