= Allen (given name) =

Allen, a variant spelling of Alan, is the given name of:

== People ==
=== Artists and entertainers ===
- Allen Ansay (born 2003), Filipino actor, model, and singer
- Allen Bickford, Australian actor
- Allen Case (1934–1986), American actor
- Allen Collins (1952–1990), one of the founding members, guitarist and songwriter for the Southern rock band Lynyrd Skynyrd
- Allen Coulter, American television and film director
- Allen Covert (born 1964), American comedian, actor, writer, and producer
- Allen Curnow (1911–2001), New Zealand poet and journalist
- Allen Danzinger (born 1942), American actor
- Allen M. Davey (1894–1946), American cinematographer
- Allen Daviau (1942–2020), American cinematographer
- Allen Dizon (born 1977), Filipino actor
- Allen Drury (1918–1998), American novelist, writer of Advise and Consent, for which he won the Pulitzer Prize
- Allen Edward Everitt (1824–1882), English architectural artist and illustrator
- Allen Ginsberg (1926–1997), American poet and a leading figure of the Beat Generation and the counterculture
- Allen Grubman, American entertainment lawyer
- Allen Holubar (1890–1923), American actor, film director, and screenwriter
- Allen Hulsey (born 1985), American singer, songwriter, guitarist, and visual artist
- Allen Jones (born 1937), British pop artist
- Allen Jones (1940–1987), American record producer and songwriter
- Allen Neal Jones (born 1977), Known as AJ Styles, American professional wrestler
- Allen Kim (born 1990), South Korean idol singer, actor, dancer, and television host
- Allen Lanier (1946–2013), American musician, an original member of the rock band Blue Öyster Cult
- Allen Leech (born 1981), Irish actor
- Allen Ludden (1917–1981), American television personality, emcee and game show host
- Allen Payne (born 1968), American actor
- Allen M. Potter (1919–1995), American television soap opera producer
- Allen Reynolds (born 1938), American record producer and songwriter
- Allen Ritter (born 1988), American record producer, songwriter, singer, and pianist
- Allen Rivkin (1903–1990), American screenwriter
- Allen Ruppersberg (born 1944), American conceptual artist
- Allen Saalburg (1899–1987), American painter, illustrator, and screen printer
- Allen W. Seaby (1867–1953), English painter and printmaker
- Allen Shearer (born 1943), American composer and baritone
- Allen G. Siegler (1892–1960), American cinematographer
- Allen Smith Jr. (1810–1890), American portrait painter
- Allen Stone (born 1987), American musician
- Allen Toussaint (1938–2015), American musician, songwriter, record producer
- Allen Vizzutti (born 1952), American trumpeter, composer and music educator
- Allen K. Wood (1898–1977), American assistant director and production manager
- Douglas Allen Woody (1955–2000), bass guitarist of The Allman Brothers Band

=== Athletes ===
- Allen Adkins (1929–1999), American racing driver
- Allen Aldridge (defensive end) (1944–2015), American football player
- Allen Aldridge (born 1972), American retired National Football League player
- Allen Aylett (1934–2022), Australian football player
- Allen Bailey (born 1989), American National Football League player
- Allen Barbre (born 1984), American National Football League player
- Allen Battle (born 1968), American baseball player
- Allen W. Benson (1905–1999), American baseball pitcher
- Allen Berg (born 1961), Canadian racing driver
- Allen P. Berkstresser (1885–1956), American football and basketball coach and college athletic administrator
- Allen Bradford (American football) (born 1988), American football player
- Allen Brown (1943–2020), American retired National Football League player
- Allen Bryant (1918–1992), American baseball pitcher
- Allen Carter (born 1952), American football player
- Allen Chapman (born 1974), American soccer referee
- Allen Chapman (American football) (born 1991), American football player
- Allen Christensen (footballer) (born 1991), Australian rules footballer
- Allen Coage (1943–2007), American professional wrestler and Olympic judo bronze medalist
- Allen Conkwright (1896–1991), American baseball pitcher
- Allen Córdoba (born 1995), Panamanian baseball player
- Allen Crabbe (born 1992), American basketball player
- Allen Craig (born 1984), American baseball player
- Allen Crowe (1928–1963), American racing driver
- Allen Doyle (born 1948), American golfer
- Allen Durham (born 1988), American basketball player
- Allen Elliott (1897–1979), American baseball player
- Allen Flanigan (born 2001), American basketball player
- Allen Fox (born 1939), American tennis player and coach
- Allen Green (1938–2023), American football punter
- Allen Greene (born 1977), American athletic director
- Allen Guevara (born 1989), Costa Rican footballer
- Allen Harvin (born 1959), American football player
- Allen Hopkins (pool player) (born 1951), American Hall-of-Fame pool player and color commentator
- Allen Hopkins (soccer commentator), American sportscaster
- Allen Hurns (born 1991), American National Football League player
- Allen Iverson (born 1975), retired American basketball player
- Allen Jacobs (1941–2014), American football player
- Allen Jakovich (born 1968), retired Australian rules football player
- Allen Jeardeau (1866–1900), American football and baseball coach
- H. Allen Jerkens (1929–2015), American Thoroughbred race horse Hall of Fame trainer
- Allen Johnson (born 1971), American hurdler
- Allen Kelley (1932–2016), American basketball player
- Allen Larue (born 1981), Seychelles footballer
- Allen Lazard (born 1995), American football player
- Allen Leavell (born 1957), American basketball player
- Allen Levrault (born 1977), American baseball pitcher
- Allen Lyday (born 1960), American football player
- Allen Lynch (footballer) (1938–2021), Australian footballer
- Allen May (born 1969), American racing driver
- Allen McDill (born 1971), American baseball pitcher
- Allen McDonough (1804–1888), Irish jockey
- Allen Murphy (born 1952), American basketball player
- Allen Nichols (1916–1981), American football player
- Allen Njie (born 1999), Liberian footballer
- Allen Nono (born 1992), Gabonese footballer
- Allen Oliver (1924–2024), English footballer
- Allen Ong (born 1979), Malaysian swimmer
- Allen Patrick (born 1984), American football player
- Allen Pedersen (born 1965), Canadian ice hockey player
- Allen Pitts (born 1964), retired Canadian Football League player
- Allen Pinkett (born 1964), American football player
- Allen Reisner (born 1988), American National Football League player
- Allen Rice (born 1962), American football player
- Allen Ripley (1952–2014), American baseball pitcher
- Allen Robinson (born 1993), American football player
- Allen Rosenberg (1931–2013), American rowing coxswain and coach
- Allen Rossum (born 1975), American football player
- Allen Russell (1893–1972), American baseball pitcher
- Allen Snyder, American football player and football, basketball, and baseball coach
- Allen Stack (1928–1999), American swimmer, 1948 Olympic champion
- Allen Steck (born 1926), American mountaineer and rock climber
- Allen Steckle (1872–1938), American football player and coach
- Allen Steen, American martial arts practitioner, teacher, and promoter
- Allen Tankard (born 1969), English footballer
- Allan Tolmich (1918–2012), American world record hurdler
- Allen Trammell (born 1942), American football player
- Allen Watson (born 1970), American baseball pitcher and coach
- Allen Webster (born 1990), American baseball pitcher
- Allen Yanes (born 1997), Guatemalan footballer
- Allen York (born 1989), Canadian hockey goaltender
- Allen H. Zikmund (1922–2018), American football player and coach

=== Businessmen ===
- Allen Chao (born 1944), Taiwanese-American businessman
- Allen Lloyd (born 1949), British businessman, founder of LloydsPharmacy
- Allen B. Morgan Jr., American businessman
- Allen Paulson (1922–2000), American businessman and horse breeder
- Allen Questrom (born 1941), American businessman
- Allen Rosenshine (born 1939), American advertising executive and CEO
- Allen Stanford (born 1950), American financier convicted of fraud
- Allen Weisselberg (born 1947), American businessman

=== Clergy ===
- Allen James Babcock (1898–1969), American Roman Catholic bishop
- Allen L. Bartlett (born 1929), American Episcopal priest
- Allen W. Brown (1909–1990), bishop of the Episcopal Diocese of Albany, New York
- Allen Francis Gardiner (1794–1851), British Royal Navy officer and missionary
- Allen Johnston (1912–2002), American Anglican Archbishop of New Zealand and bishop
- Allen J. Miller (1901–1991), 5th Bishop of Easton
- Allen Secher (born 1935), American rabbi, civil and human rights activist, radio host, television producer, actor, author, and public speaker
- Allen K. Shin, Korean-American bishop
- Allen Henry Vigneron (born 1948), American Roman Catholic Archbishop of Detroit and bishop
- Allen Yuan (1914–2005), Chinese Protestant Christian pastor

=== Lawyers, politicians and government officials ===
- Allen Adams (1946–1990), Scottish politician
- Allen Bristol Aylesworth (1854–1952), Canadian lawyer and politician
- Allen H. Bagg (1867–1942), American politician
- Allen E. Barrow (1914–1979), American judge
- Allen S. Baker (1842–1916), American politician
- Allen J. Bartunek (1928–1997), American politician
- Allen C. Beach (1825–1918), American lawyer and politician, Secretary of State and Lieutenant Governor of New York
- Allen Biehler, American Secretary of the Pennsylvania Department of Transportation from 2003 to 2011
- Allen J. Bloomfield (1883–1932), American businessman and politician
- Allen Boyd (born 1945), American politician
- Allen Alexander Bradford (1815–1888), American delegate
- Allen T. Brinsmade (1837–1913), American politician
- Allen Brown (public servant) (1911–1999), Australian public servant
- Allen Buansi, American politician
- Allen R. Bushnell (1833–1909), American attorney and politician
- Allen G. Campbell (1834–1902), American miner, politician, and philanthropist
- Allen D. Candler (1834–1910), American politician, governor of Georgia
- Allen T. Caperton (1810–1876), American and Confederate States politician
- Allen M. Christensen (born 1946), American politician
- Allen T. Compton (1938–2008), American judge
- Allen Cook, American politician
- Allen Foster Cooper (1862–1917), American politician
- Allen Turner Davidson (1819–1905), Confederate politician
- Allen Dudley, American politician
- Allen Dulles (1893–1969), American diplomat and lawyer, first civilian Director of Central Intelligence
- Allen Craig Eiland (born 1962), American politician
- Allen J. Ellender (1890–1972), American politician, senator from Louisiana
- Allen Engel (born 1932), Canadian farmer and politician
- Allen E. Ertel (1937–2015), American politician
- Allen V. Evans (born 1939), American politician
- Allen J. Flannigan (1909–1965), American politician
- Allen M. Fletcher (1853–1922), American politician, governor of Vermont
- Allen C. Fuller (1822–1901), American politician
- Allen J. Furlow (1890–1954), American politician and lawyer
- Allen Thomson Gunnell (1848–1960), American lawyer, judge, and state legislator
- Allen Hamiter (1867–1933), American politician
- Allen Burroughs Hannay (1892–1983), American judge
- Allen Hobbs (1899–1960), governor of American Samoa and US Navy hydrographer
- Allen Hogg, American politician
- Allen Jaggi (born 1944), American politician
- Allen Johnson (activist), leader in the Civil Rights Movement
- Allen F. Johnson, American businessman and government official
- Allen C. Kelley (1937–2017), American economist
- Allen Kerr (politician) (born 1956), American politician and insurance agency owner
- Allen T. Klots (1889–1965), American lawyer
- Allen Kolstad (1931–2008), American farmer and politician
- Allen Kukovich (born 1947), American politician
- Allen P. Lovejoy (1825–1904), American lumber merchant and manufacturer and politician
- Allen T. Lucas (1917–1973), American lawyer and politician
- Allen S. Matthews (1845–1915), American merchant and politician
- Allen G. Mitchell (1894–1953), American politician
- Allen F. Moore (1869–1945), American politician
- Allen B. Morse (1837–1921), American diplomat, jurist, and politician
- Allen J. Oliver (1903–1953), American politician
- Allen I. Olson (born 1938), American politician and attorney, former governor of North Dakota
- Allen Ferdinand Owen (1816–1865), American legislator and lawyer
- Allen Russell Patrick (1910–1995), Canadian politician
- Allen Paul (politician) (born 1945), American politician
- Allen J. Payton (1861–1917), American farmer and politician
- Allen Potter (1818–1885), American politician
- Allen Quist (born 1944), American politician
- Allen Roach, Canadian politician elected to the Legislative Assembly of Prince Edward Island in 2011
- Allen Rothenberg, American lawyer and President of COLPA
- Allen F. Rush (1902–1980), American politician
- Allen G. Rushlight (1874–1930), American politician, businessman, and plumber
- Allen G. Schwartz (1934–2003), American judge
- Allen D. Scott (1831–1897), American lawyer and politician
- E. Allen Smith, Auditor General of Ceylon (1946–1953)
- Allen Snyder (born 1946), American lawyer and politician
- Allen E. Stebbins (1872–1941), American politician
- Allen R. Sturtevant (1879–1966), American attorney and judge
- Allen C. Thompson (1906–1980), American politician
- Allen G. Thurman (1813–1895), American politician, Ohio Supreme Court justice and vice presidential nominee
- Allen W. Thurman (1847–1922), American politician
- Allen Treadaway (born 1961), American politician
- Allen T. Treadway (1867–1947), American politician
- Allen Trimble (1783–1870), American politician
- Allen Trovillion (1926–2020), American politician
- Allen H. Turnage (1891–1971), American politician
- Allen F. Warden (1852–1927), American newspaper editor and politician
- Allen Weh (born 1942), American business executive, politician, and U.S. Marine colonel
- Allen Wellons (born 1949), American attorney and politician
- Allen West (born 1961), American politician and U.S. Army lieutenant colonel
- Allen S. Whiting (1926–2018), American political scientist and government official
- Allen T. Wikoff (1825–1902), American politician
- Allen W. Wilder (1843–18??), American state legislator, teacher, and lawyer
- Allen Williamson, member of the Oklahoma House of Representatives from 1966 to 1974
- Allen C. Winsor (born 1976), American judge
- Allen N. Yancy (1881–1941), Vice President of Liberia from 1928 to 1930
- Allen Zoll, American political activist

=== Scientists, engineers, and academics ===
- Allen Abraham (1865–1922), Ceylon Tamil academic and astronomer
- Allen V. Astin (1904–1984), American physicist
- Allen Baker (1852–1918), Canadian-British engineer
- Allen J. Bard (born 1933), American chemist and professor
- Allen Bergin (born 1934), American clinical psychologist
- Allen Boothroyd (1943–2020), British industrial designer
- Allen Buchanan (born 1948), American philosopher
- Allen G. Debus (1928–2009), American science historian
- Allen F. Donovan (1914–1995), American aerospace engineer and systems engineer
- Allen B. Downey (born 1967), American computer scientist
- Allen B. DuMont (1901–1965), American electronics engineer, scientist and inventor
- Allen Dyer, American psychiatrist and professor
- Allen C. Eaves (born 1941), Canadian scientist
- Allen Frances (born 1942), American psychiatrist
- Allen James Fromherz (born 1980), American historian
- Allen O. Gamble (1910–2001), American industrial psychologist
- Allen J. Greenough (1905–1974), American engineer
- Allen C. Guelzo (born 1953), American historian and professor
- Allen Hatcher (born 1944), American topologist, professor and author
- Allen Hawley (1893–1978), American fundraising administrator
- Allen J. Hubin (born 1936), American historian and biographer
- J. Allen Hynek (1910–1986), American astronomer, professor and ufologist
- Allen Johnson (historian) (1870–1931), American historian, teacher, biographer, and editor
- Allen Klein (author) (born 1938), American gelotogist and author
- Allen Lane (1902–1970), British publisher, founder of Penguin Books
- Allen S. Lee, American researcher
- Allen Lowrie (1948–2021), Australian botanist
- Allen Mawer (1879–1942), English philologist
- Allen Meadors (born 1947), American professor and university administrator
- Allen R. Miller (1942–2010), American mathematician
- Allen J. Moore (born 1958), American researcher
- Allen Newell (1927–1992), American researcher in computer science and cognitive psychology
- Allen George Packwood, British archivist
- Allen B. Rosenstein (1920–2018), American systems engineer
- Allen J. Scott (born 1938), English geographer
- Allen Sessoms (born 1946), American physicist, diplomat, and academic advisor
- Allen Shenstone (1893–1980), Canadian physicist
- Allen Shields (1927–1989), American mathematician
- Allen C. Skorepa (1941–1998), American lichenologist
- Allen Steere, American rheumatologist
- Allen W. Trelease, American historian and professor
- Allen Weiner, American legal academic
- Allen B. Wilson (1823–1888), American inventor
- Allen W. Wood (born 1942), American philosopher

=== Soldiers ===
- Allen D. Beemer (1842–1909), American Civil War veteran and businessman
- Allen Buchanan (1876–1940), US Navy officer and Medal of Honor recipient
- Allen M. Burdett Jr. (1921–1980), US Army lieutenant general
- Allen S. Cutts (1826–1896), American soldier
- Allen J. Greer (1878–1964), US Army colonel and Medal of Honor recipient
- Allen W. Gullion (1880–1946), US Army officer
- Allen Hobbs (1899–1960), US Navy hydrographer and governor of American Samoa
- Allen J. Jamerson (born 1961), US Air Force officer
- Allen Johnson (Indian Army officer) (1829–1907), British Indian Army officer
- Allen James Lynch (born 1945), U.S. Army soldier and Medal of Honor recipient
- Allen K. Ono (1933–2016), US Army lieutenant general
- Allen T. Paredes (born 1965), Filipino Air Force general
- Allen Lawrence Pope (1928–2020), American military and paramilitary aviator
- Allen B. Reed (1884–1965), US Navy officer
- Allen R. Schindler Jr. (1969–1992), US Navy seaman murdered for being gay
- Allen L. Seaman (1916–1944), US Navy aviator
- Allen H. Turnage (1891–1971), US Marine Corps general
- Allen Wheeler (1903–1984), English Royal Air Force officer and pilot
- Allen B. Worley, 10th US Merchant Marine Academy Superintendent

=== Writers and journalists ===
- Allen Adler (1916–1964), American writer
- Allen Barra, American journalist and author
- Allen M. Hornblum, American author, journalist, criminal justice official, and political organizer
- Allen Hunt (born 1964), American author, speaker, and pastor
- Allen Paul (writer), American author, reporter, and political speech writer
- Allen Rucker (born 1945), American writer and author
- Allen Say (born 1937), Japanese-American writer and illustrator
- Allen Steele (born 1958), American journalist and science fiction writer
- Allen Young (writer) (born 1941), American journalist, author, editor, publisher, and social activist

=== Other ===
- Allen Apsley (disambiguation), several people
- Allen Aaron Cook (1832–1899), American architect
- Allen Cunningham (born 1977), American poker player
- Allen Dorfman, murdered American mobster
- Allen Edwards (disambiguation), several people
- Allen Frantzen (born 1947 or 1948), American medievalist
- Allen Johnson (disambiguation), several people
- Allen Jones (disambiguation), several people
- Allen B. Kanavel (1874–1938), American surgeon
- Allen V. Kneese (1930–2001), American pioneer
- Allen Lewis (disambiguation), several people
- Allen McClure (1935–2007), American sailor
- Allen Miller (disambiguation), several people
- Allen Morris (disambiguation), several people
- Allen Rosenberg (disambiguation), several people
- Allen Snyder (disambiguation), several people
- Allen Thompson (disambiguation), several people
- Allen West (disambiguation), several people
- Allen Whipple (1881–1963), American surgeon
- Allen Young (1827–1915), English master mariner and explorer

== Fictional characters ==
- Allen (Ninjago), character in Ninjago
- Allen (The Walking Dead), in The Walking Dead comic book series and television series
- Allen Adam, alter ego of the DC Comics superhero Captain Atom
- Allen Avadonia, a character portrayed by Kagamine Len in a Vocaloid multimedia series known as "The Evillious Chronicles"
- Allen Walker, the protagonist in the D.Gray-man manga and anime series
- Allen the Alien, character in Image Comics’ Invincible comic book series and television series
- Allen the Magic Goose, from the Canadian adult animated show Kevin Spencer

== See also ==
- Allen (disambiguation)
- Allen (surname)
- Alan (given name)
  - List of people with given name Alan
- Allan (given name)
- Allien Whittaker, a Jamaican retired footballer
