= Alfred Miller =

Alfred or Alf Miller may refer to:

- Alfred Jacob Miller (1810–1874), American painter
- Alfred Miller (rugby union) (1859–1923), Irish rugby union player
- Alfred Douglas Miller (1864–1933), British Army general
- Alfred Henry Miller (1904–1967), American football player
- Alf Miller (1917–1999), English footballer who mostly played for Southport and Plymouth Argyle

== See also ==
- Alf Millar (1887–1946), Australian rules footballer
- Al Miller (disambiguation)
