= Born Again Movement =

The Born Again Movement (重生派 Chongshengpai) B.A.M., or Word of Life Church, or All Ranges Church (全范围教会 Quanfanwei jiaohui, "Total Scope Church") of China is a Christian religious movement founded by Peter Xu Yongze in 1968 during the Chinese Cultural Revolution, when all churches were officially closed by the Communist government under Chairman Mao.

The B.A.M. is a Henan-based house church network whose membership may run into the millions. In 1998 there were an estimated 3 million followers independent of the official Three-Self Patriotic Movement churches in China. The magazine Christianity Today reports that “Spinoffs from BAM, one of the fastest-growing religious groups in China, have an estimated 20 million followers, nearly twice the size of the registered church, which was re-established in 1979”. Xu had taught that weeping was an essential evidence of repentance, though in recent years this has had less emphasis in the movement. Concern over this emphasis came not only from the official Three-Self Patriotic Movement church, but also from some Chinese house church leaders.

Xu was arrested by the Chinese government in 1998 on charges of “being a leader of a banned religious cult, disrupting public order, and spreading religious heresy about the imminent end of the world”.

The official Chinese news agency compared Xu to David Koresh. Both registered-church and house church leaders, including Samuel Lamb and Allen Yuan, have criticized Xu and his movement for unorthodox teaching, such as the expectation that new converts weep for three days to bring about forgiveness for their sins. He was set free in 2000.

== See also ==
- Born again
- List of the largest Protestant bodies
