= Alan Miller =

Alan Miller may refer to:

- Alan Miller (coach) (1925–2000), Australian rules football coach
- Alan B. Miller (born 1937), American businessman and founder of Universal Health Services, Inc.
- Alan Miller (American football) (1937–2024), American football fullback
- Alan Miller (game designer), American video game designer
- Alan Miller (journalist) (born 1954), American journalist
- Alan Eugene Miller (1965–2024), American spree killer executed in Alabama
- Alan Miller (footballer) (1970–2021), English football goalkeeper
- Alan Miller, songwriter on the 2003 album The Mavericks

== See also ==
- Alan Millar (born 1947), English philosopher
- Allan Miller (born 1929), American actor
- Allan Miller (footballer) (1925–2006), Australian rules footballer
- Allen Miller (disambiguation)
- Al Miller (disambiguation)
