= Allen Miller =

Allen Miller may refer to:

- Allen J. Miller (1901–1991), American Episcopal bishop
- Allen Miller (American football) (born 1940), American football linebacker
- Allen R. Miller (1943–2010), American mathematician
- Allen Miller (golfer) (born 1948), American golfer
- A. J. Miller (Allen J. Miller, born 1989), American baseball coach

== See also ==
- Alan Miller (disambiguation)
- Alan Millar (born 1947), English philosopher
- Allan Miller (born 1929), American actor
- Allan Miller (footballer) (1925–2006), Australian rules footballer
