= Allen Paul =

Allen Paul or Alan Paul may refer to:

- Allen Paul (writer), American author, reporter and political speech writer
- Allen Paul (politician) (born 1945), Republican member of the Indiana Senate
- Alan Paul, a singer/composer
- Alan Paul (author)

== See also ==
- Paul Allen (disambiguation)
