= Brother Yun =

Chinese evangelist (born 1958)

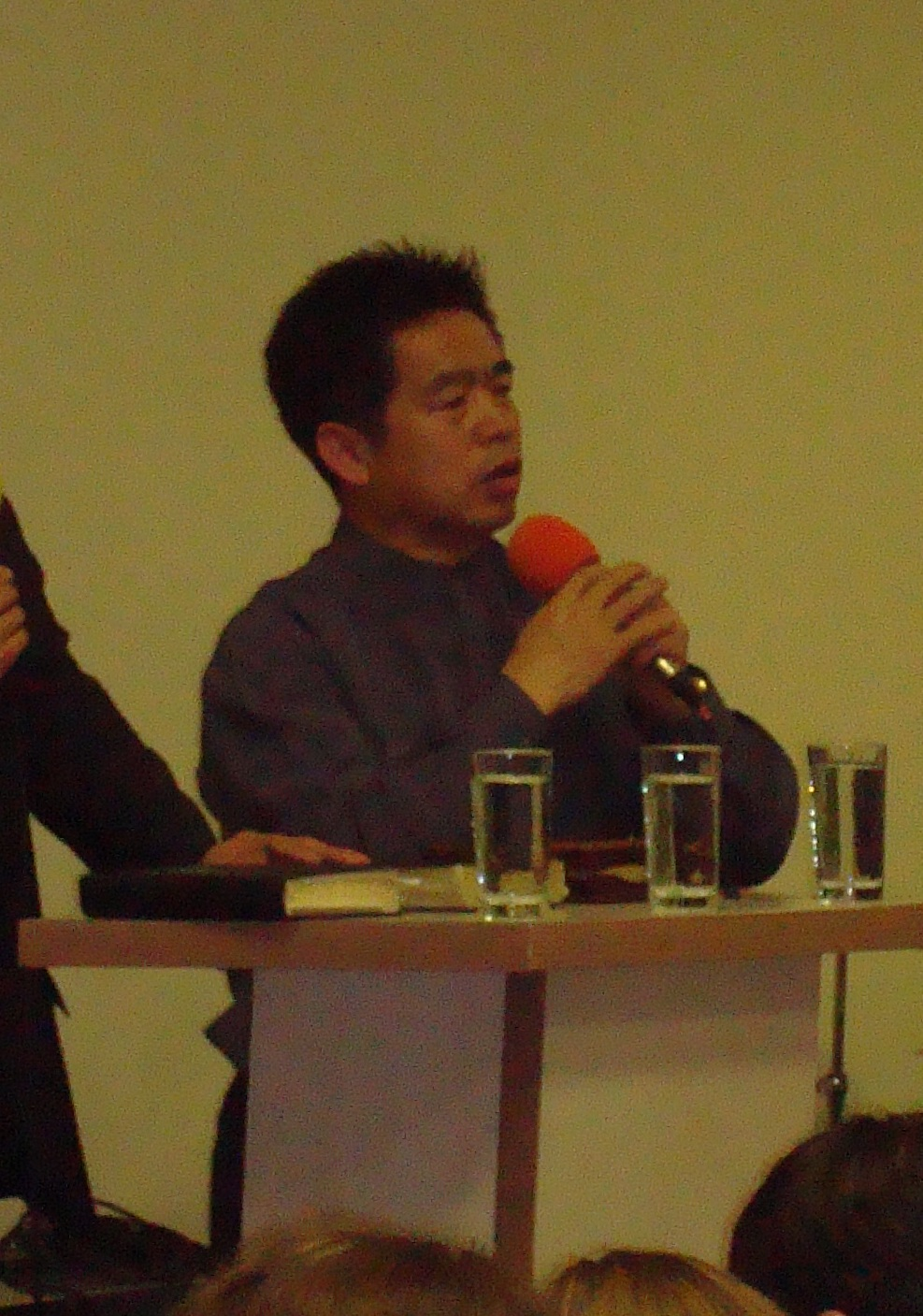
- Brother Yun in 2010.
- Born: Liu Zhenying (刘振营); 1 January 1958 (age 68); China
- Occupation: Evangelist
- Spouse: Sister Deling
- Children: 2

Ecclesiastical career
- Religion: Evangelical Christian
- Ordained: Chinese house church
- Offices held: Back To Jerusalem movement
- Website: backtojerusalem.com

Liu Zhenying (Chinese: 刘振营; pinyin: Liú Zhènyíng; born 1 January 1958), known as Brother Yun (Chinese: 云弟兄; pinyin: Yún Dìxiōng, literally "Brother Cloud"), is an exiled Chinese Christian house church leader, evangelist, and proponent of the Back To Jerusalem movement. Brother Yun was involved in the Christian house church networks in China during the 1980s and 90s. Accounts about his life and ministry are to be found in his autobiography, The Heavenly Man.

== Life in China ==
Brother Yun's book tells both of great persecution, and a surprising series of miracles of deliverance very similar (though often even more 'extreme') to those found in the Bible. Despite a life of poverty in China, he since has spoken to thousands internationally with the Gospel message. Seen as a rebel among some Chinese for not joining the government-controlled Christian organization, he was imprisoned and tortured by the government authorities. His book reports that he became a highly wanted man across several provinces. He was finally arrested and sentenced to many years in prison. However, Brother Yun continued his ministry while in prison, with more claims of miraculous results. As a result, many prisoners and even prison officials are reported to have become born-again Christians. While he gained increasing favor from some officials, he also became a target of increased persecution by others. He was repeatedly beaten and became severely malnourished. While in prison, Brother Yun writes about undertaking a total fast without food or water for 74 days.

After many years in prison, he escaped from Hangzhou from which it is reported that nobody had previously escaped. He described how he heard the voice of the Holy Spirit, telling him to simply walk out the heavily guarded prison gate. Despite the risk of being shot, he wrote later that he obeyed the voice, and walked straight through several closed prison doors in front of many prison guards, across the prison yard and finally out of the main gate. Brother Yun stated that it was as if he had become invisible to the guards who stared straight through him. Although human invisibility is a pseudoscience, some prison guards have lost their jobs for this 'embarrassing mishap.' It is claimed that the official investigation by the Chinese Government concluded that Brother Yun received no human help in his escape and therefore should remain free. He claims to be the only person to have escaped from this notorious maximum security prison.

== Life in exile ==
His ministry struggled briefly when Chinese Christians became increasingly fearful of housing him because of the potential repercussions from government authorities. After escaping from China, Brother Yun took asylum in Germany. In 2001 he was imprisoned in Myanmar for seven months. As a leader of the "Back to Jerusalem Movement", Brother Yun seeks to evangelise the countries between China and Israel, which are among the least-Christianised of the world.

He is married to Deling, with whom he has two children.

== The Heavenly Man ==
The Heavenly Man is an autobiography of Brother Yun detailing his life from the age of sixteen, through his three accounts of incarceration, and ending in his exile to Germany.

It was awarded the "Christian Book of the Year" by the UK Christian Booksellers Convention in 2003. The title comes from the name by which Brother Yun was known amongst the house church networks. He gained that name from one night of interrogation when he would only answer "I am a Heavenly Man!", instead of revealing his true name, in order to protect other Christians from the police.

Released in early 2002, the book is co-written and translated by Paul Hattaway and published by Monarch Publications.

== Living Water ==
The book Living Water was released in 2008 and, as with his previous book, The Heavenly Man, it is also co-written and translated by Paul Hattaway. It is published by Zondervan Publications.

It consists of his teachings while in North America and Europe.

== Controversy ==
Samuel Lamb (Lin Xiangao) has stated that Brother Yun falsely claimed to have fasted without food and water for nearly twice as long as Jesus, and falsely claiming to represent 58 million house-church Christians, and raising large sums of money in many countries. He also insists that Brother Yun in no way represents the house-churches in China, although Lamb admits he has never met Brother Yun or read his autobiography.

This controversy has not been without defense. Paul Hattaway, the co-author of the book has published an open response that claims the attacks on the credibility of Brother Yun are rumours originating with Titus Pan in Hamburg. Various Chinese House Church leaders have again expressed their love and respect for Brother Yun. Among them is Peter Xu, founder of the Back to Jerusalem Gospel Mission, who was a fellow prison inmate of Brother Yun. Included in The Heavenly Man (p. 299) is a letter from the elders of the Sinim Fellowship of house church leaders in China, commending Brother Yun as "blameless before God" and his testimony as "genuine."

== See also ==
- Religion in China
- Christianity in China
- Protestantism in China
- Persecution of Christians
- List of Protestant theological seminaries in China

== Bibliography ==
- Brother Yun, "Tianshang ren" (天上人), The Heavenly Man (in Chinese), Q zone.
