= MusicHound =

Compiler of genre-specific music guides

MusicHound (often stylized as musicHound) was a compiler of genre-specific music guides published in the United States by Visible Ink Press between 1996 and 2002. After publishing eleven album guides, the MusicHound series was sold to London-based Music Sales Group, whose company Omnibus Press had originally distributed the books outside America. The series' founding editor was Gary Graff, formerly a music critic with the Detroit Free Press.

Subtitled "The Essential Album Guide", each publication typically contained entries providing an overview of an artist's career and dividing their work into categories such as "what to buy", "what's next", "what to avoid" and "worth searching for". Among the MusicHound album guides were titles dedicated to rock, blues, classical, jazz, world music, swing, and soundtrack recordings. Further to the canine analogy in the series title, albums were graded according to a "bone" rating system: five bones constituting the highest score, down to a bold-rendered "woof!", signifying "dog food".

Graff has said that he had envisioned the books as buyer's guides, specifically: "something akin to a good record store clerk or that fellow shopper you meet while you're looking through the racks and with whom you strike up a spontaneous conversation". Gale-owned Visible Ink also published a series of VideoHound film guides, beginning with 1991's Golden Movie Retriever.

== MusicHound Rock: The Essential Album Guide ==
Edited by Gary Graff and published in 1996, MusicHound Rock was the first guide in the series. A revised edition appeared in 1999, co-edited by Graff and Daniel Durchholz. Among the guide's reviewers were US music critics Joel Selvin (San Francisco Chronicle), Mark J. Petracca (Creem), Greg Kot (Chicago Tribune, Rolling Stone), Brian Mansfield (USA Today), Thor Christensen (Dallas Morning News, Spin), and Roger Catlin (Hartford Courant). Other contributors included: Gary Pig Gold, who went on to work on six subsequent MusicHound guides; Grant Alden and Peter Blackstock, co-founding editors of No Depression magazine; The Big Takeover publisher Jack Rabid, who had previously written for Trouser Press's record guide; Guitar World editor Alan Paul; and Anders Wright, news editor of the music website Wall of Sound. In 1996, the book contained entries for some 2,500 artists; in this first edition, the reviewers deemed that 541 albums were worthy of a five-bone rating.

The 1999 edition came with a CD, supplied by Capitol Records, and included "What album changed your life?" sidebars written by celebrity musicians. Among the latter contributors were the following: Joan Baez, Peter Buck, Adam Clayton, Phil Collins, Jakob Dylan, Ben Harper, Mickey Hart, Lenny Kravitz, Simon Le Bon, Stevie Nicks, Lou Reed, Robbie Robertson, Gene Simmons, Patti Smith, Paul Stanley, Sting and Pete Townshend. The book's foreword was written by Doug Fieger, singer and guitarist with the Knack. Writing in The Riverfront Times in July 1999, Jason Toon noted "some unique elements" that the guide offered – such as details on each artist's main influences and who they in turn influenced – while comparing MusicHound Rock with reference works by Penguin, Rough Guide and AllMusic.

== Other publications ==
MusicHound Classical: The Essential Album Guide (1996)

- Edited by Garaud Mactaggart

MusicHound Country: The Essential Album Guide (1997)

- Edited by Brian Mansfield and Gary Graff

MusicHound Blues: The Essential Album Guide (1998)

- Edited by Leland Rucker; foreword by Al Kooper

MusicHound Folk: The Essential Album Guide (1998)

- Edited by Neal Walters and Brian Mansfield; foreword by Mark Moss

MusicHound R&B: The Essential Album Guide (1998)

- Edited by Gary Graff, Josh Freedom du Lac and Jim McFarlin

MusicHound Jazz: The Essential Album Guide (1998)

- Edited by Steve Holtje and Nancy Ann Lee

MusicHound Lounge: The Essential Album Guide to Martini Music and Easy Listening (1998)

- Edited by Steve Knopper

MusicHound Swing!: The Essential Album Guide (1999)

- Edited by Steve Knopper

MusicHound Soundtracks: The Essential Album Guide to Film, Television and Stage Music (1999)

- Edited by Didier C. Deutsch; forewords by Lukas Kendall and Julia Michels

MusicHound World: The Essential Album Guide (2000)

- Edited by Adam McGovern; forewords by David Byrne and Angélique Kidjo

== Sources ==
- Graff, Gary; Durchholz, Daniel, eds. (1999). MusicHound Rock: The Essential Album Guide. Farmington Hills, MI: Visible Ink Press. ISBN 1-57859-061-2.
- The New Rolling Stone Encyclopedia of Rock & Roll. New York, NY: Fireside/Rolling Stone Press. 1995. ISBN 0-684-81044-1.
