= Robert Miller =

Robert or Bob Miller may refer to:

== Business ==
- Robert Hugh Miller (1826–1911), American publisher
- Robert William Miller (1879–1958), founder of Australian coal mine and shipping company RW Miller
- Robert Warren Miller (born 1933), American-British businessman and developer of duty-free shopping
- Steve Miller (automotive industry executive) (Robert Steven Miller Jr., born 1941), American businessman
- Robert Miller (Canadian businessman) (born 1943), Canadian businessman who founded Future Electronics
- Robert G. Miller (born 1944), American businessman

== Entertainment ==
- Bob Miller (songwriter) (1895–1955), American songwriter, recording artist, and publisher
- Bob Miller, 1950s British bandleader with Bob Miller and the Millermen
- Robert Ellis Miller (1927–2017), American film director
- Robert Miller (pianist) (1930–1981), American pianist and attorney
- Robert Miller (bassist) (born 1951), American bassist and songwriter
- Robert Miller (composer), American composer
- Rob Miller (musician), English musician and swordsmith

== Law ==
- Robert H. Miller (judge) (1919–2009), Chief Justice of the Kansas Supreme Court
- Robert A. Miller (judge) (born 1939), Chief Justice of the South Dakota Supreme Court
- Robert Lowell Miller Jr. (born 1950), U.S. federal judge

== Politics and government ==
- Robert Meller (or Miller, 1564–1624), English member of parliament for Poole and Bridport
- Robert Byron Miller (1825–1902), English-born lawyer and politician in colonial Tasmania
- Robert A. Miller (Oregon politician) (1854–1941), American politician in Oregon
- Robert Francis Miller (fl. 1926–1929), Canadian politician
- Robert Thomas Miller (1893–1962), mayor of Austin, Texas
- R. Burnett Miller (Robert Burnett Miller, 1923–2018), mayor of Sacramento, California
- Robert Hopkins Miller (1927–2017), American diplomat
- Bob Miller (Australian politician) (1941–2026), Victorian state MP
- Bob Miller (Nevada politician) (born 1945), governor of Nevada
- Robert Edmond Miller (born 1947), Jamaican diplomat
- Bob Miller (Alaska politician) (born 1953), American journalist, media personality and politician
- Robert Miller (Jamaican politician), Jamaican member of parliament from 2020 to 2025

== Religion ==
- Robert Miller (Irish bishop) (1866–1931), bishop of the Church of Ireland
- Robert O. Miller (1935–2009), American bishop of the Episcopal Diocese of Alabama
- Robert D. Miller (1966–2023), American Old Testament theologian and biblical archaeologist
- Robert Miller (archdeacon) (born 1971), archdeacon of the Church of Ireland
- Robert J. Miller, American academic associated with the Jesus Seminar

== Science and medicine ==
- Robert Rush Miller (1916–2003), American ichthyologist
- Robert C. Miller (1920–1998), American meteorologist and USAF officer who pioneered tornado forecasting
- Robert M. Miller (1927–2024), American equine behaviorist and veterinarian
- Robert H. Miller (surgeon) (born 1947), American surgeon
- Robert I. Miller (fl. 1989–2024), United States Air Force general and medical officer

== Sports ==
=== Baseball ===
- Bob Miller (pitcher, born 1868) (1868–1931), pitcher in 1890–91
- Bob Miller (second baseman), second baseman from 1923 to 1932
- Bob Miller (pitcher, born 1926) (1926–2020), pitcher for the Philadelphia Phillies from 1949 to 1958
- Bob Miller (pitcher, born 1935) (1935–2022), pitcher from 1953 to 1962
- Bob Miller (pitcher, born 1939) (1939–1993), right-handed pitcher from 1957 to 1974

=== Football and rugby ===
- Bob L. Miller (footballer) (1923–1993), Australian rules footballer
- Bob Miller (American football) (1929–2006), American football tackle for the Detroit Lions
- Robert Miller (running back) (born 1953), American football player
- Rob Miller (footballer) (born 1980), English footballer
- Rob Miller (rugby union) (born 1989), English rugby union player

=== Other sports ===
- Robert Miller (cricketer) (1895–1941), English cricketer
- Bob Miller (sportscaster) (born 1938), announcer for the Los Angeles Kings ice hockey team
- Bob Miller (basketball) (born 1956), American basketball player
- Bob Miller (ice hockey) (1956–2020), American ice hockey player

== Others ==
- Robert Talbott Miller (1910–1999), American who allegedly spied for the Soviet Union
- Ben Lexcen (Robert Clyde Miller, 1936–1988), Australian yacht designer
- Robert Miller (art dealer) (1939–2011), American gallerist
- Robert Miller (architect) (born 1954), American architect
- Robert James Miller (1983–2008), United States Army Special Forces soldier and Medal of Honor recipient

== See also ==
- Bobby Miller (disambiguation)
- Bert Miller (disambiguation)
- Robert Millar (disambiguation)
- Robin Miller (disambiguation)
