= Al Miller =

Al Miller may refer to:

- Alfred Henry Miller (1904–1967), also known as Al Miller, American football player
- Al Miller (racing driver, born 1907) (1907–1967), American racing driver
- Al Miller (racing driver, born 1921) (1921–1978), American racing driver
- Al Miller (soccer) (born 1936), American soccer coach

== See also ==
- Al Millar (1929–1987), Canadian ice hockey player
- Alfred Miller (disambiguation)
- Alan Miller (disambiguation)
- Albert Miller (disambiguation)
