= Meadors =

Meadors is a surname. Notable people with the surname include:

- Allen Meadors (born 1947), American professor and university administrator
- Marynell Meadors (born 1943), American basketball coach
- Nate Meadors (born 1997), American football player
