= Liz McConnell =

American politician

Member of New Hampshire House of Representatives for Rockingham 11
- In office December 5, 2018 – December 1, 2020
- Preceded by: Allen Cook
- Succeeded by: Melissa Litchfield

Personal details
- Party: Democratic

Elizabeth "Liz" McConnell is an American politician. She was a member of the New Hampshire House of Representatives.

In 2020, she endorsed the Elizabeth Warren 2020 presidential campaign.
