= Muj =

Music duo from New York City

- Origin: New York City, New York, United States
- Genres: Pop, rock, dance, electronica, trip hop, acoustic
- Years active: 2008–present
- Members: Allen Hulsey; Emre Atabay
- Website: muj.com

Muj is a music duo from New York City formed in 2008, by members Allen Hulsey (born in Rochester, NY on February 8, 1985) and Emre Atabay (born in Istanbul, Turkey January 15, 1986). Muj songs span a wide variety of genres including pop, rock, dance, electronica, trip hop and acoustic. Muj has been a semi-finalist in a talent search from MTV named Music Universe Contest for their song "Elastic" from album 2012. This album was given rave reviews by a number of critics. Muj also won "Clash of the artists" event organized by Art for Progress, for live music. Both Allen and Emre have graduated from Berklee College of Music.

== Band history ==
=== Band formation ===
Allen and Emre met while attending Berklee College of Music in Boston where they formed the band Static Picture in 2006. Allen and Emre wrote the material for the band which included bassist Nick Funk (born in Woodstock, VA January 19, 1985) and drummer Adrian Olsen (born in Richmond, VA October 23, 1985). Static Picture disbanded after only one EP titled "WhiteWash" however the song "Inside Against Me" recorded by Static Picture in a more aggressive rock style later appeared on the debut album 2012 with a more epic orchestral arrangement. Adrian Olsen also appears on 2012 playing drums on seven tracks and singing background vocal lyric "What do you want" on the song "What You Want". The instruments on Muj recordings include guitars (bass, electric, acoustic, fretless, slide), piano, kanun (108 string harp), Saz, Synthesizers and Computer Software.

== Discography ==
- 2012 (2010)

== See also ==
- Inglis, Jennifer (2010). "A little bit of Rock'n'roll". thestylecrusader.blogspot.com.
- Batinich, Cassie (2010). "Muj is on - 2012 Album Review". wineandsecrets.blogspot.com.
- Logue, Jennifer (2010). "MUJ makes their Mercury Lounge Debut". www.prlog.org.
- KevW (2012). "The sound of confusion - single review". www.blogspot.com.
- UPlaya (2011). "MUJ at UPlaya". www.uplaya.com.
