= Apsley =

Apsley may refer to:

== Places ==
- Apsley, Hertfordshire, a suburb of Hemel Hempstead, Hertfordshire, England
  - Apsley railway station
- Apsley, Ontario, a community in North Kawartha, Ontario, Canada
- Apsley, Tasmania, a locality in Tasmania, Australia
- Apsley, Victoria, a town in Victoria, Australia
- Aspley, Queensland, a suburb of Brisbane, Queensland, Australia

== People ==
- Allen Apsley (disambiguation)
- Apsley Pellatt, an English glassware manufacturer and politician
  - Apsley Pellatt (1763–1826), his father
- Apsley Cherry-Garrard, an English explorer of Antarctica
- Henry Bathurst, 2nd Earl Bathurst, also known as Lord Apsley, a British politician and lawyer
- Violet Bathurst, Lady Apsley, also known as Viscountess Aspley, a British politician

== Rivers ==
- Apsley River (New South Wales), Australia
  - Apsley Falls
- Apsley River (Tasmania), Australia

== Other ==
- Apsley House, a building in London, UK

== See also ==
- Apsley End, a hamlet in Bedfordshire, UK
