= Robert Millar (disambiguation) =

Philippa York (born Robert Millar in 1958) is a Scottish cyclist.

Robert Millar may also refer to:

- Robert Millar (marketer) (1877–1960), Irish–Norwegian marketer
- Robert Millar (soccer) (1890–1967), American soccer player and coach
- Robert Millar (rugby union) (1901–1981), Scottish rugby union player
- Robert G. Millar (1925–2001), Canadian-American Christian Identity leader and founder of Elohim City, Oklahoma
- Bob Millar, guitarist and vocalist for Australian rock band The Deakins
- Robert Millar (1950–2024), drummer for English rock band Supertramp
- Robert McColl Millar (born 1956), Scottish linguist
- Robbie Millar (1967–2005), Northern Irish chef and restaurateur

== See also ==
- Robert Miller (disambiguation)
