= Bobby Miller =

Bobby Miller may refer to:

- Bobby Miller (Gaelic footballer) (1950–2006), Irish Gaelic footballer and ball club manager
- Bobby Miller (musician) (born 1966), American musician
- Bobby Miller (filmmaker), American film-maker
- Bobby Miller (baseball) (born 1999), American baseball player

== See also ==
- Bobbie Heine Miller (1909–2016), South African tennis player
- Robert Miller (disambiguation)
