= Bert Miller =

Bert Miller may refer to:

- Bert Miller (baseball) (1875–1937), American baseball pitcher
- Bert H. Miller (1876–1949), American politician from Idaho
- Bert Miller (footballer) (1880–1953), English footballer
- Bert Miller, CPUSA party name during the 1920s of Benjamin Mandel (1887–1973), director of research for HUAC

== See also ==
- Bertie Miller (born 1949), Scottish footballer
- Hubert Miller (1918–2000), American bobsledder and army officer
- Albert Miller (disambiguation)
- Robert Miller (disambiguation)
