= Albert Miller =

Albert Miller may refer to:

- Allie Miller (Albert Crist Miller, 1886–?), American football player and coach
- Albert C. Miller (1898–1979), American attorney
- Alan Mills (musician) (1912–1977), born Albert Miller, Canadian singer
- Roger Milla (Albert Roger Miller, born 1952), Cameroonian footballer
- Albert Miller (athlete) (born 1957), Fijian decathlete and hurdler

== See also ==
- Al Miller (disambiguation)
- Bert Miller (disambiguation)
- Albert Miller Lea (1808–1891), American engineer, soldier and topographer
