= Josh Yokela =

American politician

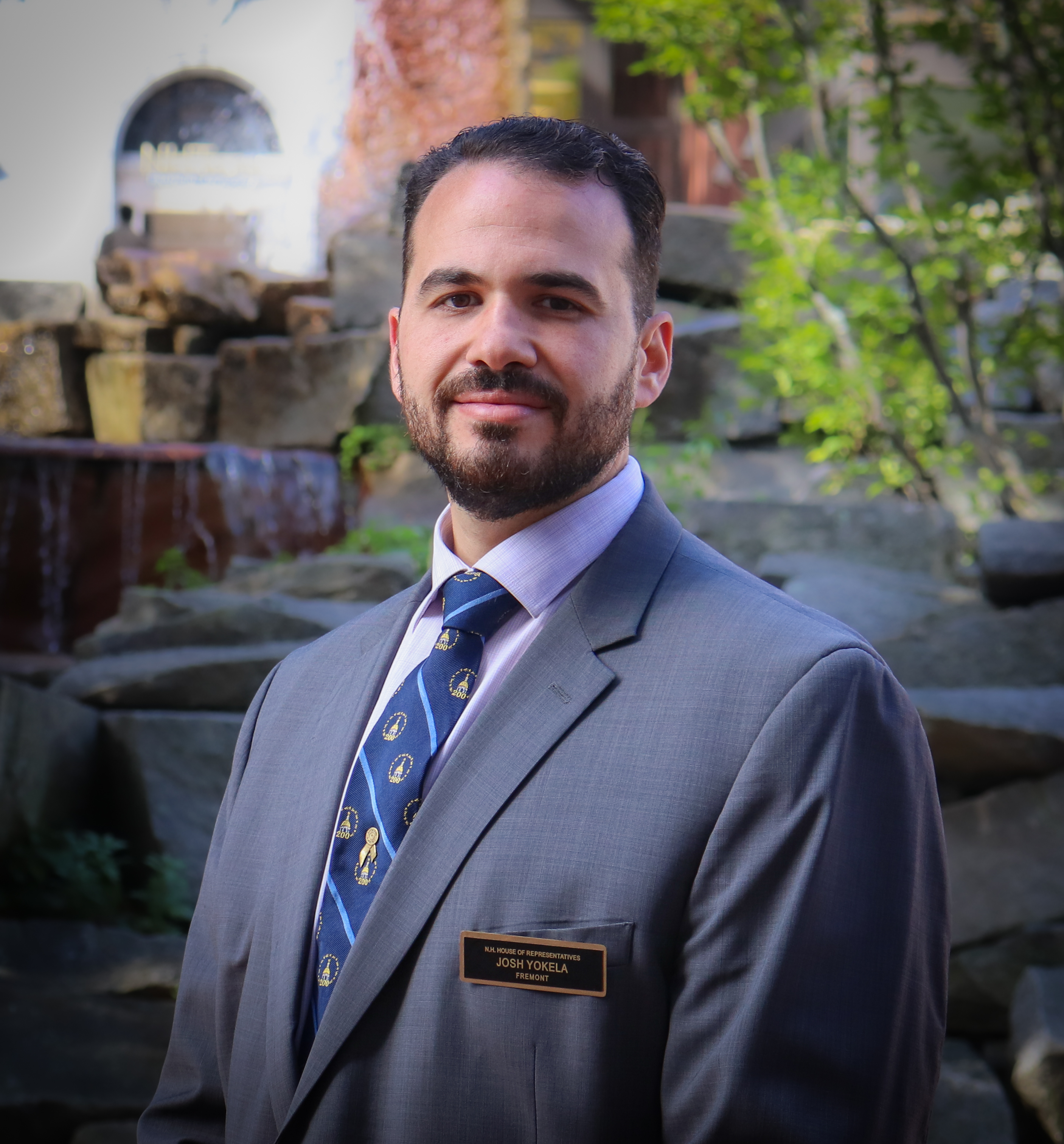
- Josh Yokela in 2022

Member of the New Hampshire House of Representatives from the Rockingham 33rd district
- Incumbent
- Assumed office December 5, 2018
- Preceded by: Scott Wallace
- Succeeded by: Melissa Litchfield (elect)

Personal details
- Born: 1986 (age 39–40) Fremont, California, U.S.
- Party: Republican
- Profession: State Legislator

Josh Yokela (born December 17, 1986) is an American Republican legislator elected to the New Hampshire House of Representatives on November 6, 2018. He was elected to represent Rockingham 33 district which includes the towns of Brentwood, Danville, and Fremont. He sits on the Children and Family Law Committee which hears matters including the rights of children, divorce, and child support. He lives in Fremont, New Hampshire and holds positions on the Fremont Zoning Board of Adjustments and the Fremont Budget Committee.

== Political activity ==
Josh Yokela sponsored HB567 which would switch New Hampshire to the Atlantic Time Zone if Maine and Massachusetts agreed to move to the Atlantic Time Zone, too. This is a proposed solution to get around the Federal restriction against accepting Daylight Saving Time all year round. The bill passed the House of Representatives in 2019 with a vote of 208–120, but was not supported by the Senate. He, sponsored HB317 in 2019 which aims to end the restriction on aftermarket tinting of car windows to the right and left of the driver for people without a medical waiver. New Hampshire is one of three states that do not allow any aftermarket tint on the front side windows of a car. HB317 passed the New Hampshire House and was tabled by the Senate. The issue of tinting front side windows of a car was taken back up by him in 2021 in HB 224 and was passed into law and went into effect on 10/9/2021. Also in 2021, Josh Yokela sponsored three other bills which were signed into New Hampshire law, HB 258 permitting wage and hour records to be approved and retained electronically, HB 208 repealing RSA 323 regarding lightning rod dealers and salesmen, and HB 566 relative to the discussion of disclosure of the minutes from a nonpublic session under the right-to-know law.
