= Paul Allen (disambiguation) =

Paul Allen (1953–2018) was an American businessman and co-founder of Microsoft.

Paul Allen may also refer to:

== People ==
- Paul Allen (editor) (1775–1826), American editor and author
- Paul Hastings Allen (1883–1952), American composer
- Paul H. Allen (1911–1963), American botanist
- Paul M. Allen (born 1951), American cellular immunologist
- Paul Allen (footballer) (born 1962), English footballer
- Paul Coy Allen (born 1977), American filmmaker, television director and music video director
- Paul Allen (bassist), bass player for Hal
- Paul Allen (sports commentator) (born 1966), host of The Paul Allen Show on KFXN-FM and radio broadcaster for the Minnesota Vikings
- Paul Allen, co-founder of Ancestry.com
- Paul R. Allen, American mortgage CEO convicted for fraud

== Characters ==
- Paul Allen, a character in the 1991 novel American Psycho and the 2000 film adaptation

== Others ==
- 23120 Paulallen a minor planet
- Paul Allen's flower fly

== See also ==
- Paul Allen Simmons (1921–2014), American federal judge
- Allen (surname)
- Allen Paul (disambiguation)
