= Greg Miller (Australian footballer) =

Australian rules footballer and administrator

Personal information
- Born: 8 May 1953 (age 73)
- Original team: East Burwood (EDFL)
- Height: 188 cm (6 ft 2 in)
- Weight: 88 kg (194 lb)

Playing career^{1}
Years	Club	Games (Goals)
1972–1976	South Melbourne	52 (0)
- ^{1} Playing statistics correct to the end of 1976.

Greg Miller (born 8 May 1953) is a former Australian rules football player and administrator. He played with South Melbourne in the Victorian Football League (VFL).

== Playing career ==
A defender, Miller was cleared to South Melbourne during the 1972 VFL season, from Richmond, where he played in the thirds. He came from East Burwood originally. After appearing in the final four rounds in 1972, Miller retained his spot in the team at the start of the 1973 season, but didn't play after round five due to a knee injury. He played 17 games in 1974, as a full-back, then made 20 appearances in 1975. More knee problems brought an early end to his 1976 season, in which he played six games.

From 1977 to 1979, Miller played for Sandringham in the Victorian Football Association.

== Football administration ==
In 1980, Miller was made South Melbourne's recruiting officer.

He was CEO of North Melbourne from 1985 to 1989, then again from 1995 to 2001.

In 1987, he secured the signature of Wayne Carey, who he had first spotted at a primary school football carnival, representing New South Wales. Carey was tied to the Sydney Swans, as Wagga Wagga was in their residential zone, but he convinced the club's general manager Ron Thomas to release him to North Melbourne.

In 2002, he joined Richmond as Football Manager and remained in that role until he resigned during the 2008 AFL season.

== Personal life ==
Miller is the son of former South Melbourne footballer Allan Miller.
