= Back to Jerusalem movement =

The Back to Jerusalem movement (Chinese: 传回耶路撒冷运动; pinyin: chuánhuí yēlùsālěng yùndòng) is a Christian evangelistic campaign that began in mainland China by Chinese believers to send missionaries to all of the Buddhist, Hindu, and Muslim peoples who live "between" China and Jerusalem. They believe that the Back to Jerusalem movement is a call from God for the Chinese church to preach the gospel and establish fellowships of believers in all countries, cities, towns, and ethnic groups between China and Jerusalem.

== History ==
The Back to Jerusalem idea was initially conceived during the 1920s by the Jesus Family church in Shandong province. While the vision eventually lost traction in the Jesus Family, the Northwest Spiritual Movement would split from the Jesus Family and revive the original vision. Simon Zhao became the main leader of this movement in the 1940s. In 1946, another group in Henan province, the Back to Jerusalem Evangelistic Band, independently developed a similar vision. However, government restrictions and persecution forced the movement to go underground for decades, and its leader Simon Zhao spent 31 years in prison in Kashgar.

Since 2003, the most vocal international proponent of "Back to Jerusalem" has been the exiled Chinese house church leader Liu Zhenying, also known as "Brother Yun". Yun intended for "Back to Jerusalem" to evangelize fifty-one countries by sending a minimum of 100,000 missionaries along the Silk Road, an ancient trade route that winds from China to the Mediterranean Sea. The ongoing work of evangelism, both within China and beyond its borders, is done anonymously by Chinese church members, who make no appeals for money or seek any publicity for themselves.

== Criticism ==
There has been some criticism of the Back to Jerusalem movement from both inside and outside China. According to the researcher Kim-kwong Chan, some see the movement as a "hoax." He further sees as problematic the spirit of missionary martyrdom and its ethnocentric claim of China's role in bringing the gospel on its final leg. Ezra Jin of Beijing Zion Church has made a distinction between the movement within China and those promoting it from outside China, arguing that a stronger biblical theology of mission does not encompass a Zionist theology but underscores the need for the church in China to have a global mission which brings all to God's reign.
