= Allen J. Payton =

American farmer and politician from Indiana

Member of the Indiana State Assembly from the Spencer County, Indiana district

Personal details
- Born: circa 1861-62 Indiana, U.S.
- Died: 1917 (aged 54–55) Evansville, Indiana, U.S.
- Occupation: Farmer

Allen J. Payton (March 7, 1861–March 1, 1917) was an American farmer and politician. He represented Spencer County in the Indiana General Assembly.

== Early life and education ==
Allen J. Payton was born in Indiana March 7, 1861.

== Career and life ==
Payton worked as a farmer. He operated a farm in Luce Township, Indiana in 1880. On June 3, 1881, he married Anna Stevenson. The couple would go on to have five children.

=== Life in politics ===
Payton ran for the Indiana General Assembly, to represent Spencer County, in the 1888 election, running against Benjamin B. Brown. Payton won the election after an investigation into voter fraud.

== Later life ==
Around 1900, Payton served on a committee to place historical markers at select sites in Spencer County where Abraham Lincoln or his family resided or spent time.

By 1910, Payton was serving on the board of the Independent Telephone Association. Payton died in Evansville, Indiana on March 1, 1917.

== Legacy ==
A collection of Payton's letters are held in the collection of the Indiana State Library.
