= Robert Edmond Miller =

Robert Edmond Miller (born 24 January 1947 in Kingston, Jamaica) is a Jamaican diplomat, currently serving as Jamaica's High Commissioner to Abuja, Nigeria.

== Biography ==
Miller has spent most of his career working as a Jamaican diplomat with postings in Brussels, Belgium, Lagos, Nigeria and to Cameroon. Miller has worked as the Head of the Caricom Single Market and Economy (CSME) in the Ministry of Foreign Affairs and Foreign Trade in Kingston, Jamaica.

Miller was educated at Kingston College, Kingston, Jamaica. He is married with three children.
