= Allen Thomson Gunnell =

Colorado politician

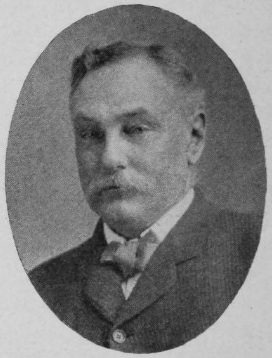

Member of the Colorado Senate
- In office 1890–1891

Member of the Colorado House of Representatives
- In office 1878–1880

Personal details
- Born: January 20, 1848 Saline County, Missouri
- Died: March 21, 1907 (aged 59) Colorado Springs, Colorado
- Resting place: Evergreen Cemetery
- Spouse: Elizabeth M. Hancock (m. 1872)
- Children: 2
- Education: Bethany College
- Occupation: Lawyer, judge, politician

Allen Thomson Gunnell (January 20, 1848 – March 21, 1907) was an American lawyer, judge, and state legislator in Colorado.

== Biography ==
Gunnell was born in Saline County, Missouri. He earned an A.B. degree at Bethany College, then studied law in Sedalia, Missouri. He married Elizabeth M. Hancock on October 22, 1872, and they had two children. He settled in Colorado in 1875.

He served in the Colorado House of Representatives from 1878 to 1880, and in the Colorado Senate from 1890 to 1891. He was a lawyer and represented owners of mining companies.

He died in Colorado Springs on March 21, 1907 after a long illness, and was buried at Evergreen Cemetery.

The Colorado Springs Pioneers Museum has an oil painting of him.
