= Allen Nichols =

American football player (1916–1981)

No. 27, 51
- Position: Fullback

Personal information
- Born: October 28, 1916; Pittsburgh, Pennsylvania, U.S.
- Died: June 18, 1981 (aged 64); Gibsonia, Pennsylvania, U.S.
- Listed height: 5 ft 10 in (1.78 m)
- Listed weight: 205 lb (93 kg)

Career information
- High school: Avalon (Avalon, Pennsylvania)
- College: Temple (1936–1939)
- NFL draft: 1940: undrafted

Career history
- Paterson Panthers (1940); Pittsburgh Steelers (1945)
- Stats at Pro Football Reference

Allen Garfield Nichols (October 28, 1916 – June 18, 1981) was an American professional football fullback who played one season with the Pittsburgh Steelers of the National Football League (NFL). He played college football at Temple University.

== Early life and college ==
Allen Garfield Nichols was born on October 28, 1916, in Pittsburgh, Pennsylvania. He attended Avalon High School in Avalon, Pennsylvania.

He was a member of the Temple Owls of Temple University from 1936 to 1939. He was on the freshman team in 1936 and a three-year letterman from 1937 to 1939.

== Professional career ==
After going undrafted in the 1940 NFL draft, Nichols played in three games for the Paterson Panthers of the American Association in 1940, scoring one rushing touchdown.

He signed with the Pittsburgh Steelers of the National Football League in 1945. He started one game for the Steelers during the 1945 season, rushing ten times for five yards, fumbling once, and recovering one fumble. He was released in 1945.

== Death ==
Nichols died on June 18, 1981, in Gibsonia, Pennsylvania.
