= Melissa Litchfield =

American politician

Member of the New Hampshire House of Representatives from the Rockingham 32nd district
- Incumbent
- Assumed office December 4, 2024
- Preceded by: Josh Yokela

Member of the New Hampshire House of Representatives from the Rockingham 11th district
- In office December 2, 2020 – December 7, 2022

Personal details
- Party: Republican
- Education: West Boylston Jr/Sr Highschool
- Alma mater: Assumption University, Southern New Hampshire University
- Website: Official website

Melissa Litchfield is an American politician. She serves as a Republican member for the Rockingham 32nd district of the New Hampshire House of Representatives. She previously served as a Republican member for the Rockingham 11th district of the New Hampshire House of Representatives.

== Political career ==
In 2021, Litchfield said that students at a local high school having their hands marked with a sharpie to indicate if they had or had not received their COVID-19 vaccination as "prisoners in Nazi Germany".

== Personal life ==
Melissa and her husband live in Brentwood, New Hampshire with their four children.
