= Allen Yuan =

Chinese pastor

- Born: 1914; Bengbu, Anhui Province
- Died: 16 August 2005 (aged 90–91); Beijing
- Education: Far East College of Theology
- Partner: Liang Huizhen

Allen Yuan Xiangchen (Chinese: 袁相忱; pinyin: Yuán Xiāngchén; 1914 – 16 August 2005) was a Chinese Protestant Christian pastor. He was acclaimed by Open Doors as "a towering figure in China's house church movement" and known for his resistance against participation in the state-sanctioned Three-Self Patriotic Movement, which resulted in imprisonment for more than twenty-one years.

== Early life ==
Yuan was born in Bengbu, Anhui, to parents from Dongguan, Guangdong, after his father found work on the construction of the Beijing–Guangzhou railway. Yuan's family relocated to Beijing during his childhood, with his mother taking Yuan and his siblings away from their father over several extramarital affairs. Yuan was mostly raised by his grandparents, growing up with no close friends.

During his teenage years, Yuan was often depressed and made two suicide attempts. At age 13, Yuan's father sent his son to a Christian school, where he memorised classic literature and the Bible, also learning English. Part of his curriculum included listening to sermons of Wang Mingdao. At the school, Yuan became a follower of Sun Yat-sen's nationalist teachings, initially rejecting Christianity as a foreign religion in favour of Buddhist and Confucian teachings. He was eventually converted in December 1932 by two teachers, Xiao Anna and Shi Tianmin, the former an American woman who had married a local man. Yuan was baptised by Wang Mingdao, but remained skeptical of Christianity until he met a charismatic Christian preacher, at which point he became part of the Pentecostal wing of the Evangelical movement. In 1934, Yuan left high school to study at a seminary of the Far East College of Theology. During his four year enrollment, his parents urged him to drop out in order to marry and get a job. After attending a national Bible reading event, Yuan translated his first work, an English preacher manual, into Chinese in 1937.

Also in 1937, with the beginning of the Second Sino-Japanese War, Yuan met his wife Liang Huizhen, a Christian woman who fled to Beijing from the invading Imperial Japanese Army. They married the following year in July 1938 and had a son. Yuan was asked by the dean of his seminary to stay and work as a translator, but he and his family instead joined a travelling American preacher to evangelise in southern Hebei and Shandong. In 1941, after the attack on Pearl Harbor, the American missionaries in China ceased their work out of safety concerns. Yuan returned to Beijing, but after his apartment was looted, he and his family hid a cellar behind Yuan's church. They later left the city for a rural village in territory contested by the Japanese military and Chinese communists, continuing his itinerant preaching and taking care to avoid raising suspicion by using fake documents.

At the end of the war in 1945, Yuan returned to Beijing, where he discovered that his mother had survived, having had to mask her face with soot to avoid rape by Japanese soldiers, but was now seriously ill. As Yuan took care of her and supported his family, which now included six children, he persuaded government officials to let him rent an old church for services.

== Ministry ==
Yuan's ministry began in 1946, one year after the Japanese surrender. He was assisted by a Norwegian missionary. Yuan opened a prayer room in Beijing so that he could preach. When the government set up the Three-Self Patriotic Movement to organize churches under party control in 1950, a year after the communist revolution, many pastors such as Yuan's mentor Wang Mingdao and Watchman Nee, refused to join. Yuan begrudingly accpeted to preach through the Three-Self Patriotic Movement, but rejected it on principle as he found its teachings too liberal and preferred to self-regulate his church services. During the Anti-Rightist Campaign, Yuan publicly spoke out against the TSPM and as a result, he was labelled a rightist and repeately warned of arrest if he did not accept merging into the TSPM.

=== Imprisonment ===
On 18 April 1958, Yuan was arrested and sentenced to life in prison for "counter-revolutionary crimes". For 21 years, he was imprisoned in Beijing and at labor camps in Heilongjiang. He was frequently punished for continuing to preach gospel to other inmates, once being reported on by an imprisoned Roman Catholic priest. Yuan sometimes met fellow evangelists Wang Mindao and Wu Mujia in the prison system.

Voice of the Martyrs quoted him speaking about his imprisonment:

During those years in prison my wife suffered untold hardships in bringing up the children. I was sent to near the Russian border doing farm work, growing rice. Wang Ming Dao and I thought we would die martyrs there.

In the labor camp it was very cold, food was bad, and the work was hard, but in 22 years I never once got sick. I was thin and wore glasses, but I came back alive; many did not. I also had no Bible for the 22 years and there were no other Protestant Christians there. I met only four Catholic priests. They were in the same situation I was in; they refused to join the Chinese Catholic Patriotic Association.

Yuan was released on parole in December 1979 and started his own house church at Miaoying Temple (also known as White Stupa Temple). The house church became one of the largest house churches during his era, with two to three hundred attendees.

While his preaching was tolerated, the Three-Self Patriotic Movement repeatedly urged him to join, which he always refused, to the point that he refused to attend a prayer session with visiting American president Bill Clinton because TSPM preachers were also in attendance. He also refused help from foreign Christian charity, believing everyone had to be self-sufficient. It was noted that both before and after his imprisonment, Yuan had neglected his wife and children, to whom he was often short-tempered, but they remained close. As Yuan was never officially rehabilitated and refused to concede to any wrongdoing, he remained under police observation his whole life and occasionally kept in house arrest.

== Personal life ==
He married Liang Huizhen, also known as Lily Liang, in 1938, and they had six children in total. He died on 16 August 2005, in Beijing, and some 2,500 mourners attended his funeral on Eight Treasure Mountain in Beijing.

== See also ==
- Protestant missions in China
- Samuel Lamb
