= Allen Dyer =

American psychiatrist and educator of medical ethics

Allen Dyer M.D., Ph.D., DLFAPA
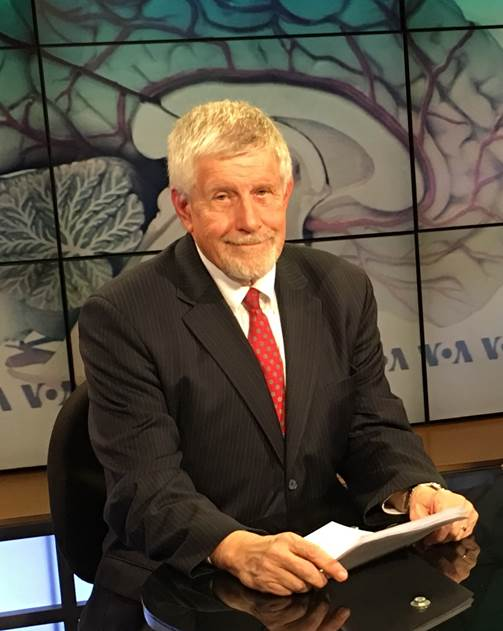
- Allen R. Dyer
- Born: Allen Ralph Dyer
- Occupations: Psychiatrist, psychoanalyst, medical ethicist, and educator
- Awards: Distinguished Life Fellow of the APA (DLFAPA), the Nancy C.A. Roeske Award in Recognition of Outstanding and Sustained Contributions to Medical Education, the Bruno Lima Award (APA, Disaster Psychiatry)

Academic background
- Education: A.B., M.M.Sc., M.D., Ph.D.
- Alma mater: Duke University (M.D., Ph.D. in medical ethics), Brown University (A.B., M.M.Sc.)
- Thesis: Idealism in Medical Ethics: The Problem of the Moral Inversion (1980)
- Doctoral advisor: William H. Poteat

Academic work
- Discipline: Psychiatry
- Sub-discipline: Global mental health, disaster psychiatry, medical ethics, psycho-oncology, spirituality and health, psychoanalysis
- Institutions: The George Washington University (professor emeritus, psychiatry and behavioral sciences), Duke University, Albany Medical College (interim chair, psychiatry), East Tennessee State University (chair, psychiatry)
- Main interests: Global health, mental health, medical ethics, professionalism, cancer survivorship, spirituality and health, stress and trauma, disaster psychiatry
- Notable works: Ethics in Psychiatry: Toward Professional Definition; Concise Guide to Ethics in Mental Health Care; One More Mountain to Climb: What My Illness Taught Me About Health; Global Mental Health Ethics
- Website: allendyer.wordpress.com

Allen Ralph Dyer is an American psychiatrist, psychoanalyst, medical ethicist, and educator. Dyer is professor emeritus of psychiatry and behavioral health at the George Washington University. He is a distinguished life fellow of the American Psychiatric Association. As of January 2017, he is the sole surviving member of the committee that formulated the so-called Goldwater rule of the American Psychiatric Association. At Duke University Medical Center, he served in roles ranging from chief resident to associate clinical professor of psychiatry and community and family medicine from 1975 to 1987. Dyer was a fellow of the National Humanities Center from 1981 to 1982, and an honorary consultant at the University of Oxford's Warneford Hospital (1983–1984). He held leadership positions at Albany Medical College, including associate chair of psychiatry and psychiatrist-in-chief at Albany Medical Center Hospital (1987–1992), and served as chair of psychiatry at East Tennessee State University (1992–1995). Dyer also worked as senior health advisor at the International Medical Corps from 2009 to 2012. From 2012 until his retirement in 2022, he was a professor of psychiatry and behavioral sciences at George Washington University.

== Early life and education ==
Dyer grew up in Newport, Maine, and graduated from Maine Central Institute. He completed his undergraduate studies at Brown University, earning an A.B. degree (1967), followed by a Master of Medical Science (M.M.Sc.) in 1970. He later attended Duke University, where he obtained his M.D. in 1972 and a Ph.D. in medical ethics from the Department of Religion in 1980. His doctoral dissertation, Idealism in Medical Ethics: The Problem of the Moral Inversion, explored the intersection of ethics, philosophy, and medicine. During his medical training at Duke, he began contributing to the American Medical Association Council on Mental Health and the American Psychiatric Association's (APA) Ethics Committee.

== Career and contributions ==
Dyer's academic career began at Duke University Medical Center, where he served in various roles, including chief resident and later on the faculty of the medical school, from 1975 to 1987. During a sabbatical in 1983 and 1984, he was an honorary consultant at the University of Oxford. He held key administrative and academic positions at Albany Medical College from 1987 to 1992 and East Tennessee State University from 1992 to 2009, where he was the department chair for psychiatry from 1992 to 1995. Between 2009 and 2012, he served as a senior health advisor at the International Medical Corps. In 2012, he joined the George Washington University School of Medicine and Health Sciences as a professor of psychiatry and behavioral sciences, where he remained until his retirement as professor emeritus in 2022.

=== Work in Iraq ===
In November 2016, Dyer delivered a lecture at East Tennessee State University (ETSU), titled "It's Not Over When It's Over: The Health Impact of War and Political Conflict". During his lecture, Dyer presented insights from his work on the long-term health consequences of war and political conflict. He stressed the enduring physical and mental health impacts of war on Iraqi civilians and health professionals. Dyer recounted stories of individuals affected by ongoing stress, including a family that fled Baghdad due to suspicions of collaborating with Americans, leaving behind their home. He noted increased incidences of stress-related health conditions among Iraqis, such as cardiovascular diseases, cancer, headaches, and various forms of dermatological disorders. He said that cancer rates in Iraq were reported to be seven to eight times higher than global averages. Dyer noted that Iraqi populations experienced unique traumas, such as displacement, exposure to violence, and sectarian conflict, exacerbating health vulnerabilities.

Dyer traced his work in Iraq back to 2001 when East Tennessee State University (ETSU) received a grant from the Meridian Foundation to assist Kurdish Iraqi medical professionals in developing their healthcare infrastructure. Despite challenges posed by the Iraq War in 2003, he resumed his work there in 2006, teaching psychiatry and collaborating with Iraqi health professionals. He has been engaged in efforts to support the development of Iraq’s healthcare system. His work was recognized in 2014 with a humanitarian assistance award for his contributions to Iraq.

=== PTSD and complex PTSD ===
Dyer's work also covers post-traumatic stress disorder (PTSD) and related conditions. He differentiates between acute trauma and ongoing traumatic stress. He introduced the concept of ongoing traumatic stress disorder (OTSD), which includes physiological as well as psychological impairment. Drawing on epidemiological data, he cited the Adverse Childhood Experiences (ACE) study, linking traumatic childhood events to long-term health risks, including heart disease, cancer, and health risk behaviors.

=== Global health and mental health ===
Besides his work in Iraq, Dyer was involved in addressing the health impacts of other global conflicts, including the Indian Ocean tsunami, the Sichuan earthquake in China, and the Haiti earthquake, the Japan Triple disaster, the Syrian refugee crisis, and hurricanes in the Caribbean. He has developed a series of Resilience Workshops, teaching community based skills employing Mental Health and Psychosocial Support (MHPSS), Psychological First Aid (PFA), Mindfulness Based Stress Reduction, Hope Modules, and Cognitive Based Therapy (CBT).

=== Ethics and psychiatry ===
In his seminal work on medical professionalism, Ethics and Psychiatry: Toward Professional Definition, he suggests that a profession is defined as much by its ethics as by its technology.

== Cancer survival ==
In 2013, Dyer published One More Mountain to Climb: What My Illness Taught Me About Health, a memoir documenting his experience battling multiple myeloma, a blood cancer for which he underwent a bone marrow transplant in 1998. The book explores his transition from physician to patient and its impact on his understanding of illness, trauma, and resilience. Proceeds from the book support the Willowcliff Foundation, an organization Dyer co-founded to promote global stewardship and citizenship.

== Selected publications ==
=== Books ===
- Dyer, A. R. (1988). Ethics and Psychiatry: Toward Professional Definition. American Psychiatric Association.
- Weiss, L & Dyer, A. (2004). Concise Guide to Ethics in Mental Health Care. American Psychiatric Press: Washington DC.
- Dyer, A. R. (2013). One More Mountain to Climb: What My Illness Taught Me About Health. Lambert Academic Publishing.

=== Edited books ===
- The Humanities and the Profession of Medicine, Allen R. Dyer, ed., Research Triangle Park, NC: National Humanities Center, 1982.
- Roberts, L. W., & Dyer, A. R. (2004). Concise Guide to Ethics in Mental Health Care. American Psychiatric Publishing, Inc..
- Global Mental Health Ethics (2021), Allen R. Dyer, Brandon Kohrt, Philip Candalis, Eds, Springer Nature.

=== Book chapters ===
- "Global Disasters, War, Conflict and Complex Emergencies: Caring for Special Populations" (Allen R. Dyer, Subhasis Bhadra), in Eliot Sorel, editor, 21st Century Global Mental Health. Jones and Bartlett, 2012.
- "Divided Loyalties in Healthcare" (Allen R. Dyer and Laura Weiss Roberts), Encyclopedia of Bioethics, 4th edition, Macmillan, 2014.
- Dyer, A.R. (2016) "The Tradition of the Therapeutic relationship". In A Clinical Guide to Psychiatric Ethics, L Roberts, ed. American Psychiatric Publishing
- Dyer, A. R. (2021). "Global mental health through the lens of ethics". In Global Mental Health Ethics (pp. 3–16). Cham: Springer International Publishing.
- Bhadra, S., & Dyer, A. R. (2022). "Resilience and well-being among the survivors of natural disasters and conflicts". In Handbook of Health and Well-Being: Challenges, Strategies and Future Trends (pp. 637–667). Singapore: Springer Nature Singapore.

=== Articles ===
- Dyer, A. R. (1985). Ethics, advertising and the definition of a profession. Journal of medical ethics, 11(2), 72-78.
- Dyer, A. R., & Bloch, S. (1987). Informed consent and the psychiatric patient. Journal of medical ethics, 13(1), 12-16.
- Dyer, A. R. (1988). AIDS, ethics, and psychiatry. Psychiatric Annals, 18(10), 577.
- Roberts, L. W., & Dyer, A. R. (2003). Caring for "difficult" patients. Focus, 1(4), 453-458.
- Lennon-Dearing, R., Lowry, L. W., Ross, C. W., & Dyer, A. R. (2009). An interprofessional course in bioethics: Training for real-world dilemmas. Journal of Interprofessional Care, 23(6), 574-585.
- Dyer, A. R. (2011). The Need for a New" New Medical Model": A Bio-Psychosocial-Spiritual Model. Southern Medical Journal, 104(4), 297.
- Des Marais, E. A., Bhadra, S., & Dyer, A. R. (2012). In the wake of Japan’s Triple Disaster: Rebuilding capacity through international collaboration. Advances in Social Work, 13(2), 340-357.
- Noorani, F., & Dyer, A. R. (2017). How should clinicians respond to transference reactions with cancer patients?. AMA Journal of Ethics, 19(5), 436-443.
- Dhumad, S., Candilis, P. J., Cleary, S. D., Dyer, A. R., & Khalifa, N. (2020). Risk factors for terrorism: A comparison of family, childhood, and personality risk factors among Iraqi terrorists, murderers, and controls. Behavioral sciences of terrorism and political aggression, 12(1), 72-88.
- Cleary, SD, PJ Candilis, S Dhumad, AR Dyer, N Khalifa Pathway to terrorist behavior: The role of childhood experiences, personality traits, and ideological motivations in a sample of Iraqi prisoners. Journal of Forensic Sciences. 2023;00:1–11. doi:10.1111/1556-4029.15429

== Awards ==
- Elected a Distinguished Life Fellow of the American Psychiatry Association (DLFAPA)
- Nancy C. A. Roeske Award in recognition of outstanding and sustained contributions to medical education
- Bruno Lima Award of the APA for Disaster Psychiatry
