= Peter Xu =

Chinese Evangelist

- Born: China
- Education: Longfellow
- Occupation: Chinese house church leader

Peter Xu (徐永泽 Xu Yongze; 9 October 1940) is the founder of an Evangelical Christian movement in China known as the "New Birth", "All Range" (全范围教会 Quanfanwei jiaohui), or "Born Again Movement." It is a Chinese house church movement, unregistered by the Chinese government. In 1997, he was sentenced to three years in prison for his leadership role. He moved to the United States following his release.

He is one of the subjects of the book Back to Jerusalem: Three Chinese House Church Leaders Share Their Vision to Complete the Great Commission by Paul Hattaway.
