= Alf Millar =

Australian rules footballer

Personal information
- Full name: Alfred Harold Millar
- Born: 14 November 1887; Horsham, Victoria
- Died: 27 October 1946 (aged 58); Cohuna, Victoria
- Original team: Geelong College

Playing career^{1}
Years	Club	Games (Goals)
1905	Geelong	5 (3)
- ^{1} Playing statistics correct to the end of 1905.

Alfred Harold Millar (14 November 1887 – 27 October 1946) was an Australian rules footballer who played for the Geelong Football Club in the Victorian Football League (VFL).
