= Allen B. Rosenstein =

American systems engineer

Allen Bertram Rosenstein (August 25, 1920 – February 23, 2018) was an American systems engineer, Professor Emeritus of Systems Engineering at the University of California at Los Angeles (UCLA), and IEEE Fellow awarded for his contributions to the "theory, design, and manufacture of power converters and for leadership and research in engineering education".

== Biography ==
Born and raised in Baltimore, Maryland, Rosenstein received his BA in Electrical Engineering in 1940 from the University of Arizona. After his military service in the U.S. Navy, he received his MA in 1950 and his PhD in 1958, both in Engineering from UCLA. He was Professor of Systems Engineering at UCLA for almost four decades.

In industry Rosenstein started eventually five companies for design and manufacturing of specific automatic controls and electro-magnetic system devices, starting with Pioneer Magnetics, Inc. in 1957. He received five different patents on Electro-Magnetic systems, consulted multiple professional organizations on electric power system, and participated in Presidential Committees and Conferences under Jimmy Carter and Ronald Reagan.

Rosenstein's research in engineering education started with his participation in an ongoing UCLA Ford Foundation funded study from 1955 to 1968 in the interrelation of professions, technology and national policy, where he became principal investigator. This research defined the "indispensable societal role and responsibility of the collective professions", and predicted an "ever-eroding U.S. industrial base and recognized the legislative, structural and institutional deficiencies that have ensured the over 50-year continuing decline of America's economic, financial, trade, technological and manufacturing leadership". This eventually lead to Rosenstein's involvement in the proposal of the "National Technology Foundation Act", which was discussed in US Congress and subcommittee on Science, Research and Technology in the 1970s and 1980s. In the 1970s Rosenstein had also been consultant in educational planning in Venezuela for UNESCO.

Rosenstein is awarded for his Lifetime Achievement by the University of Arizona, College of Engineering, and received the Fellow Award by the Institute of Electrical and Electronics Engineers.

== Publications ==
Books, a selection:

- 1950. Analysis and Synthesis of Magnetic Amplifiers with Self Feedback
- 1958. The Transactor--a Self-saturated Transformer
- 1963. Information Theory and Curricular Synthesis. With Daniel M. Rosenthal and G. Wiseman
- 1964. Engineering communications with Robert R. Rathbone, William F. Schneerer
- 1967. The Concept of Engineering Design as a Formal Discipline, Proc. ASME 8th Annual Technical Symposium Albuquerque, New Mexico, November, 1967. ed.
- 1968. A Study of a Profession and Professional Education, Allen B. Rosenstein, UCLA EDP 7-68, December, 1968
- 1968. Modeling, Analysis, Synthesis, Optimization, and Decision Making in Engineering Curricula. Department of Engineering, University of California.
- 1979. The National Professions Foundation and the Future Quality of National Life, American Association for the Advancement of Science, January, 1979
- 1983. A National Policy Facilitating Foundation, Business Week & National Foreign Trade Council Foundation
- 1986. The National Policy and Technology Foundation Act Congressional Record, Hon. George E. Brown, Jr., April, 1986
- 1990. Competitiveness and National Policy. National Conference on the Advancement of Research, October, 1990
