= Allen Bryant =

American baseball player

- Pitcher
- Born: March 29, 1918; Chicago, Illinois, U.S.
- Died: March 22, 1992 (aged 73); Kansas City, Missouri, U.S.
- Batted: Left Threw: Left

Negro league baseball debut
- 1937, for the Memphis Red Sox

Last appearance
- 1946, for the Memphis Red Sox
- Stats at Baseball Reference

Teams
- Memphis Red Sox (1937); Kansas City Monarchs (1940–1941, 1946); Memphis Red Sox (1946)

Allen Bryant Jr. (March 29, 1918 – March 22, 1992), nicknamed "Lefty", was an American Negro league pitcher who played between 1937 and 1946.

A native of Chicago, Illinois, Bryant attended Lincoln High School in Kansas City, Missouri. He made his Negro league debut in 1937 for the Memphis Red Sox, and went on to play for the Kansas City Monarchs in 1940 and 1941.

Bryant served as a sergeant in the US Army in World War II. After returning from his service, he again twirled for both Memphis and Kansas City in 1946, and later played minor league baseball in Canada. Bryant died in Kansas City in 1992 at age 73.
