= Allen F. Donovan =

American scientist

- Born: April 22, 1914; Onondaga, New York, US
- Died: March 11, 1995 (aged 80); Corona del Mar, California, US
- Education: University of Michigan
- Known for: Development of the Atlas and Titan rocket families.
- Awards: Air Force Civilian Exceptional Service Medal
- Scientific career
- Fields: Aerospace Engineering
- Workplaces: Curtiss-Wright; Cornell Aeronautical Laboratory; TRW; The Aerospace Corporation

Allen F. Donovan (April 22, 1914 – March 11, 1995) was an American aerospace engineer and systems engineer who was involved in the development of the Atlas and Titan rocket families. He served as a consultant to the President's Science Advisory Committee from 1957 until 1978.

== Biography ==
Allen F. Donovan was born in Onondaga, New York, on April 22, 1914. He graduated from the University of Michigan in 1936 with Bachelor of Science in Engineering (BSE) and Master of Science degrees. After graduation he began working for Curtiss-Wright, where his first assignment was strengthening the wings of the Curtiss Hawk biplane.

During World War II, Donovan worked on Curtiss fighters including the Curtiss P-40 Warhawk, and became head of structural and flight research at the Curtiss-Wright Research Laboratory, which he helped to create. His wartime work involved structural and flutter testing of dive bombers such as the Curtiss SB2C Helldiver and the Vought F4U Corsair. He also worked for the Manhattan Project on the design of the shape of the Fat Man atomic bomb and its release mechanism.

After the war ended, Curtiss-Wright donated the Curtiss-Wright Research Laboratory to Cornell University, and it became the Cornell Aeronautical Laboratory in January 1946. Donovan became head of its aeromechanics department. He designed the STV-1 rocket, the first U.S. supersonic vehicle, and investigated the science and technology of supersonic flight. He pioneered the use of composite materials for helicopter blades, and headed the team that developed the US Army's Lacrosse missile. He also served on the US Air Force (USAF) Scientific Advisory Board from 1948 to 1968. In this role, in 1954, he rejected plans to modify the Martin B-57 Canberra to fly reconnaissance missions over the Soviet Union, and supported the development of the Lockheed CL-282, which became the U-2 spyplane.

In 1955, Donovan joined the Ramo-Wooldridge, and moved to California. At this time Ramo-Wooldridge was involved in the development of the intercontinental ballistic missile (ICBM). As head of its aeronautics laboratory, he headed the development of the re-entry vehicles for the Atlas rocket family, and later for Titan and Thor. In 1958, he convinced the Advanced Research Projects Agency to sponsor Pioneer 1, an attempt to photograph the far side of the Moon with a probe built by Ramo-Wooldridge and launched by a Thor rocket. Pioneer 1 failed to reach the Moon but returned the first measurements of the density of micrometeorites and the interplanetary magnetic field.

When the USAF decided in 1960 that future systems engineering would be provided by a non-profit organization formed for the purpose, Donovan joined The Aerospace Corporation, which had its headquarters in El Segundo, California, as its senior vice president, technical. He worked with the president of the corporation, Ivan A. Getting, to build it into an organization with two thousand scientists and engineers. He worked with NASA to solve the problem of combustion instability that affected Project Mercury, and later on the pogo oscillation problems that affected Project Gemini and Project Apollo. He conditioned to serve with the USAF as an advisor, and was chairman of its propulsion panel from 1959 to 1968, and was involved with the highly-secret National Reconnaissance Office. Between 1957 and 1978 he served as a consultant to the President's Science Advisory Committee and on several of its panels. The USAF awarded him the Air Force Civilian Exceptional Service Medal in 1968.

Donovan became a member of the American Institute of Aeronautics and Astronautics in 1943, and was elected a fellow in 1963, and an honorary fellow in 1983. In 1964, the University of Michigan awarded him an honorary Doctor of Science in aeronautical and astronomical engineering. He was elected a member of the National Academy of Engineering in 1969, and served on the National Research Council's board of review of the Space Shuttle Main Engine.

Donovan retired in 1978, and moved to Corona del Mar, California, where he died on March 11, 1995.
