= Allen Klein (author) =

American writer (born 1938)

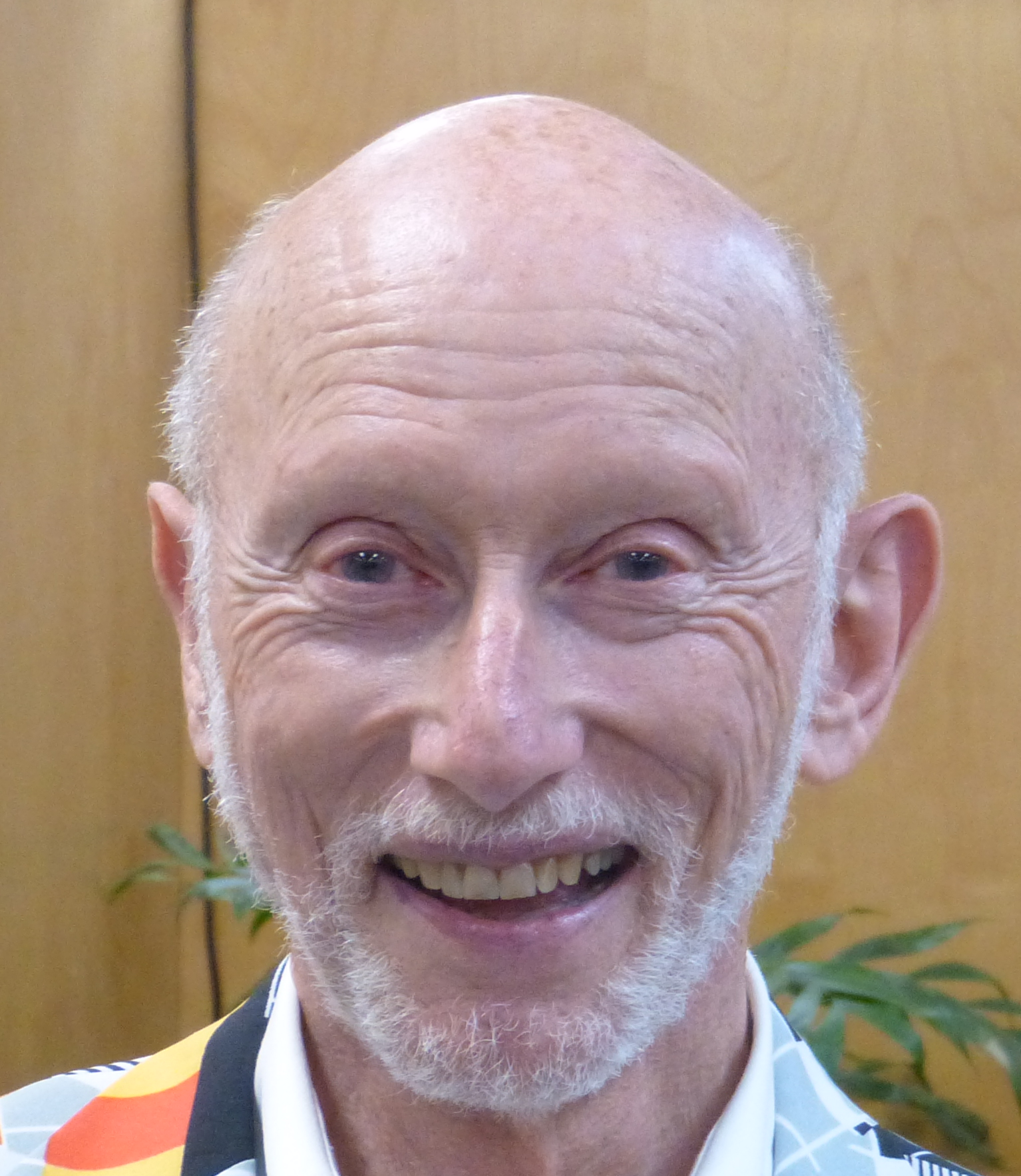
- Klein in 2015
- Born: April 26, 1938 (age 88); New York City, New York, United States
- Occupations: Author, lecturer
- Writing career
- Period: 1975–present

Allen Klein (born April 26, 1938) is a pioneer in gelotology and the therapeutic humor movement. In 1974, Klein's wife was only 34 years old when she died of liver disease, and the aspect where she had kept her sense of humor all the way to the end inspired Klein to give up his previous career as a theater and television scene designer and to study human development. Klein is an American author and lecturer on the stress relieving benefits of humor and on gallows humor. Among other positions, Klein was the 2005-2006 president of The Association for Applied and Therapeutic Humor.

== Publications ==
Klein has written 8 books on the therapeutic benefits of humor, happiness and positivity.

- The Healing Power of Humor: Techniques for Getting through Loss, Setbacks, Upsets, Disappointments, Difficulties, Trials, Tribulations, and All That Not-So-Funny Stuff ISBN 978-0-87477-519-8
- The Courage to Laugh: Humor, Hope, and Healing in the Face of Death and Dying ISBN 978-0-87477-929-5
- Learning to Laugh When You Feel Like Crying: Embracing Life After Loss ISBN 978-0-9798755-8-8
- L.A.U.G.H.: Using Humor and Play to Help Clients Cope with Stress, Anger, Frustration, and more ISBN 978-1-893277-50-2
- You Can't Ruin My Day: 52 Wake-Up Calls to Turn Any Situation Around ISBN 978-1-63228-022-0
- Secrets Kids Know...That Adults Oughta Learn ISBN 978-1-63228-053-4
- Embracing Life After Loss ISBN 978-1-64250-006-6
- The Awe Factor ISBN 978-1-64250-403-3

In addition, he has edited several books of inspirational quotations. They are:

- Change Your Life!: A Little Book of Big Ideas (foreword by Jack Canfield) ISBN 978-1-57344-407-1
- Inspiration for a Lifetime ISBN 978-1-57344-429-3
- The Art of Living Joyfully (endorsed by SARK) ISBN 978-1-936740-19-2
- Always Look on the Bright Side ISBN 978-1-936740-55-0
- Having the Time of Your Life ISBN 978-1-936740-70-3
- Mom's the Word ISBN 978-1-936740-42-0
- Word of Love ISBN 978-1-936740-30-7
- Positive Thoughts for Troubling Times ISBN 978-1-63353-956-3
- The Joy of Simplicity ISBN 978-1-64250-145-2

== Awards ==
- 2007 Hunter College, The City University of New York, Hall of Fame honoree
- Certified Speaking Professional designation from the National Speakers Association
- Toastmasters International Communication and Leadership Award
- 2009 Doug Fletcher Lifetime Achievement Award from the Association for Applied and Therapeutic Humor
