= Allen Rosenberg =

Allen or Allan Rosenberg may refer to:

- Allen Rosenberg (rowing) (1931–2013), American rowing coxswain and rowing coach
- Al Rosenberg, writer/performer
- Allan Rosenberg (spy) (1909–1991), American accused of being a spy

== See also ==
- Alan Rosenberg (born 1950), American actor
