= Allen J. Jamerson =

US Air Force officer (born c. 1961)

Brigadier General Allen J. Jamerson
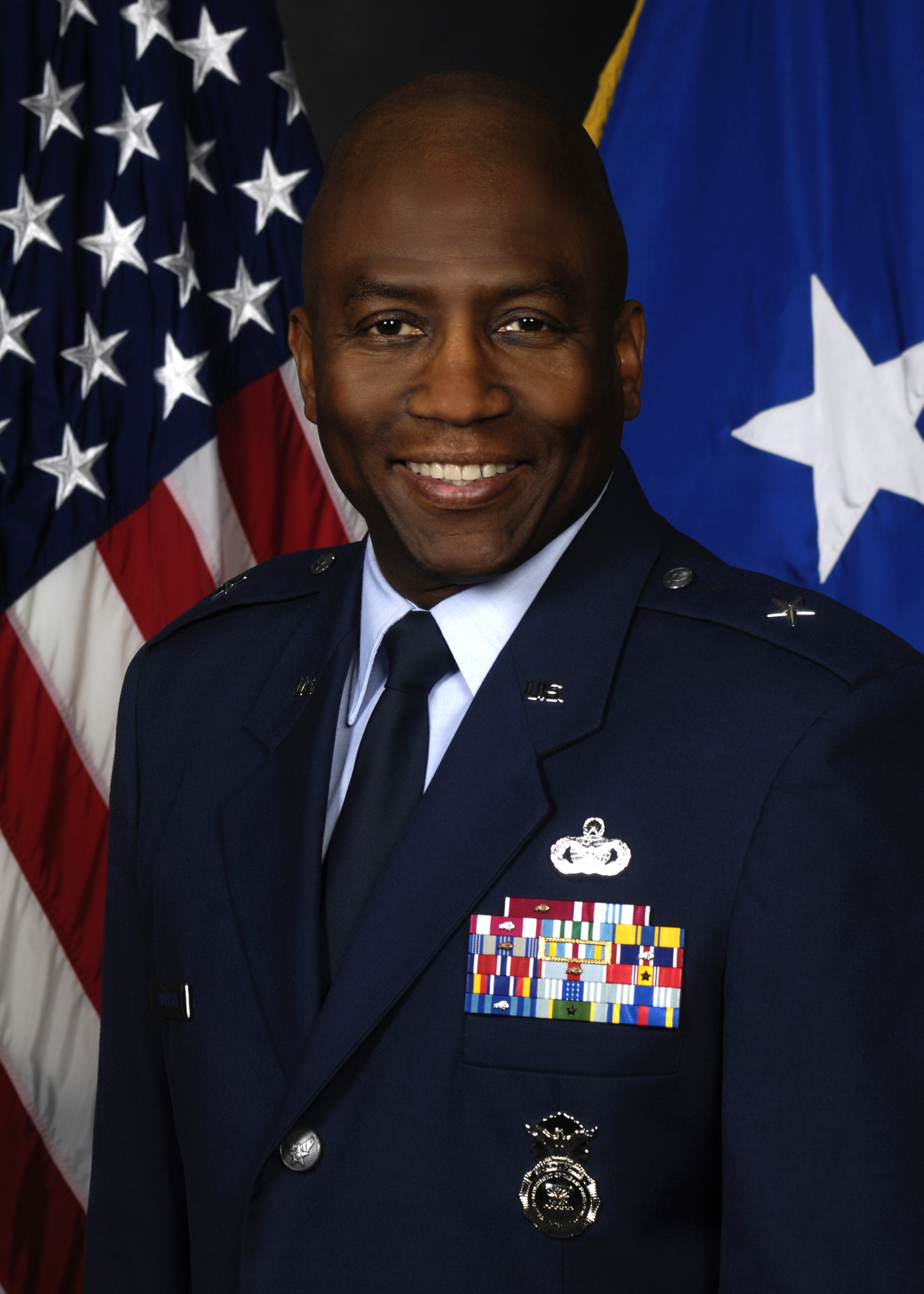
- Brigadier General Allen J. Jamerson, USAF, c. 2012
- Born: c. 1961 (age 64–65)
- Education: University of North Carolina at Pembroke (BA, BS); Webster University (MA); U.S. Army War College (MA)
- Military career
- Allegiance: United States
- Branch: United States Air Force
- Service years: 1986–2016
- Rank: Brigadier General
- Commands: United States Air Force Security Forces; 72nd Air Base Wing; 90th Security Forces Group; 78th Security Forces Squadron; 56th Security Forces Squadron
- Awards: Air Force Distinguished Service Medal; Legion of Merit (3); Defense Meritorious Service Medal; Meritorious Service Medal (6); Joint Service Commendation Medal; Air Force Commendation Medal; Air Force Achievement Medal (2)

Brigadier General Allen J. Jamerson (born c. 1961) is a retired United States Air Force officer who last served as the Director of United States Air Force Security Forces from July 2012 to October 2016.

Jamerson entered the Air Force in 1986 after graduating from the University of North Carolina at Pembroke. He was commissioned as an AFROTC distinguished graduate. After security police assignments at Whiteman AFB, Missouri, Kadena Air Base, Japan, and Vandenberg AFB, California, he served as Chief, Security Police for Clear Air Force Station, Alaska. Jamerson also held a staff position at Headquarters Air Force Space Command, Peterson AFB, Colorado, and commanded security forces squadrons at Luke AFB, Arizona, and Robins AFB, Georgia. During that time he also attended Air Command and Staff College at Maxwell AFB, Alabama.

He graduated from the United States Army War College, Carlisle Barracks, Pennsylvania, in 2003, followed by an assignment as deputy director of Security for the National Reconnaissance Office, Chantilly, Virginia. He also commanded the 90th Security Forces Group at Francis E. Warren AFB, Wyoming, was Vice Commander of the 42d Air Base Wing, Maxwell AFB, Alabama, and commanded the 72d Air Base Wing at Tinker AFB, Oklahoma.

Prior to his final position as Director of Security Forces, Jamerson served as the Chief of Staff, Headquarters Air Force Materiel Command.

== Education ==
- 1983 Bachelor of Arts in Criminal Justice, University of North Carolina at Pembroke, N.C.
- 1986 Bachelor of Science in Social Work, University of North Carolina at Pembroke, N.C.
- 1991 Squadron Officer School, Maxwell AFB, Ala.
- 1995 Federal Bureau of Investigation National Academy (NA-181), Quantico, Va.
- 1996 Master of Arts in Human Resources Development, Webster University, St. Louis, Mo.
- 1998 Air Command and Staff College, Maxwell AFB, Ala.
- 2003 Master of Arts in Strategic Studies, U.S. Army War College, Carlisle Barracks, Pa.
- 2005 Joint Forces Staff College, National Defense University, Norfolk, Va.
- 2006 Leadership Development Program, Center for Creative Leadership, Greensboro, N.C.
- 2007 Enterprise Leadership Seminar, University of North Carolina at Chapel Hill, N.C.
- 2008 Senior Manager Course, National Security Studies Program, George Washington University, Washington, D.C.
- 2014 Federal Bureau of Investigation National Executive Institute, Quantico, VA

== Military assignments ==
1. October 1986 - February 1988, Flight Security Officer, 351st Missile Security Squadron, 351st Strategic Missile Wing, Whiteman AFB, Mo.
2. February 1988 - April 1991, Officer in Charge, Plans and Resources, and Shift Commander, 18th Security Police Squadron, 18th Combat Support Wing, Kadena Air Base, Japan
3. April 1991 - March 1993, Squadron Section Commander, and Shift Commander, 30th Security Police Squadron, 30th Space Wing, Vandenberg AFB, Calif.
4. March 1993 - March 1994, Chief, Security Police, 13th Space Warning Squadron, 21st Space Wing, Clear Air Force Station, Alaska
5. March 1994 - August 1997, Chief, Security Alarm Systems, and Chief, Air Base Defense, Headquarters Air Force Space Command, Peterson AFB, Colo.
6. August 1997 - June 1998, Student, Air Command and Staff College, Air University, Maxwell AFB, Ala.
7. June 1998 - July 2000, Commander, 56th Security Forces Squadron, 56th Fighter Wing, Luke AFB, Ariz.
8. July 2000 - July 2002, Commander, 78th Security Forces Squadron, 78th Air Base Wing, Robins AFB, Ga.
9. July 2002 - June 2003, Student, U.S. Army War College, U.S. Army Training and Doctrine Command, Carlisle Barracks, Pa.
10. June 2003 - April 2005, deputy director of Security, National Reconnaissance Office, Chantilly, Va.
11. April 2005 - June 2007, Commander, 90th Security Forces Group, 90th Space Wing, F.E. Warren AFB, Wyo.
12. June 2007 - July 2008, Vice Commander, 42d Air Base Wing, Maxwell AFB, Ala.
13. July 2008 - June 2010, Commander, 72d Air Base Wing, Tinker AFB, Okla.
14. June 2010 - July 2012, Chief of Staff, Headquarters Air Force Materiel Command, Wright-Patterson AFB, Ohio
15. July 2012 – present, Director of Security Forces, Deputy Chief of Staff for Logistics, Engineering and Force Protection, Headquarters U.S. Air Force, Washington, D.C.

== Effective dates of promotion ==
Insignia	Rank	Date of rank
	Second Lieutenant	May 10, 1986
	First Lieutenant	October 1, 1988
	Captain	July 20, 1990
	Major	September 1, 1997
	Lieutenant Colonel	May 1, 2000
	Colonel	August 1, 2004
	Brigadier General	May 2, 2012
