= Allen Cook =

American politician

Member of New Hampshire House of Representatives for Rockingham 11
- In office December 3, 2014 – December 4, 2018
- Succeeded by: Liz McConnell

Personal details
- Party: Republican
- Education: Francis Marion University; University of South Carolina-Columbia

Allen W. Cook is an American politician. He was a member of the New Hampshire House of Representatives and represented Rockingham 11th district from 2014 to 2018.

He was a candidate in for Rockingham 6th district in the 2024 election but lost in the general election.
