= Allen K. Ono =

United States Army general

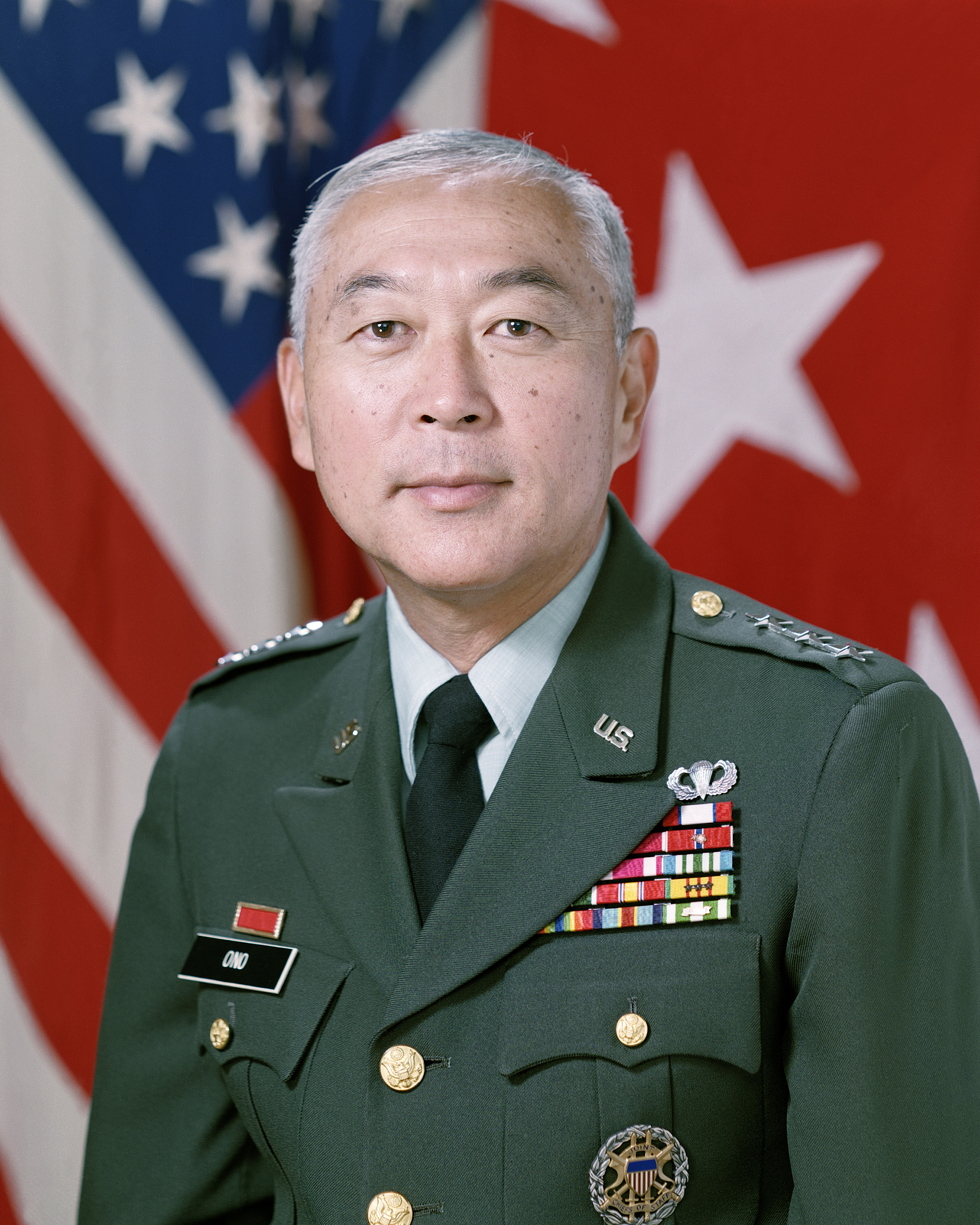
- Born: December 31, 1933; Honolulu, Territory of Hawaii, U.S.
- Died: August 1, 2016 (aged 82); Honolulu, Hawaii, U.S.
- Military career
- Allegiance: United States
- Branch: United States Army
- Service years: 1955–1990
- Rank: Lieutenant General
- Commands: Deputy Chief of Staff for Personnel; U.S. Army Recruiting Command

Allen Kenji Ono (Japanese: 小野 健次, December 31, 1933 – August 1, 2016) was a lieutenant general in the United States Army. He was born and raised in Honolulu, Hawaii. He attended the University of Hawaii and received a bachelor of arts degree in government in 1955. Ono received a master of science degree in communications from Shippensburg State College and a degree from Northwestern University's executive management program.

Ono served as commanding officer of the Army Recruiting Command from June 1985 to June 1987. He was promoted to lieutenant general in 1987. He was deputy chief of staff for personnel at U.S. Army Headquarters from 1987 to 1990. In this capacity, he directed the Army's military and civilian personnel operations. Ono was the first Japanese American lieutenant general as well as the first Asian American lieutenant general. He died in 2016 and was buried at Punchbowl National Cemetery.
