= Allen Smith Jr. =

American painter

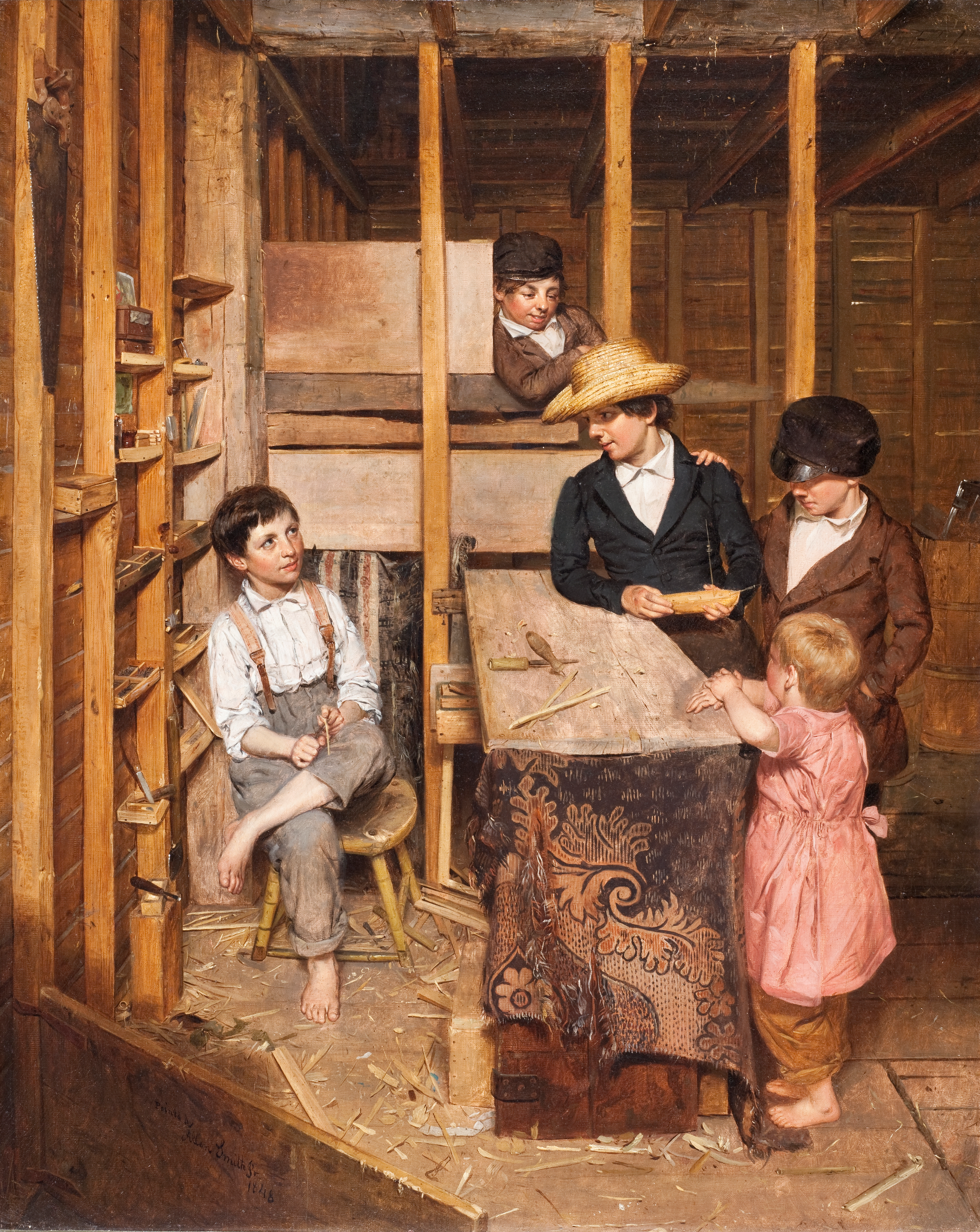
The Young Mechanic

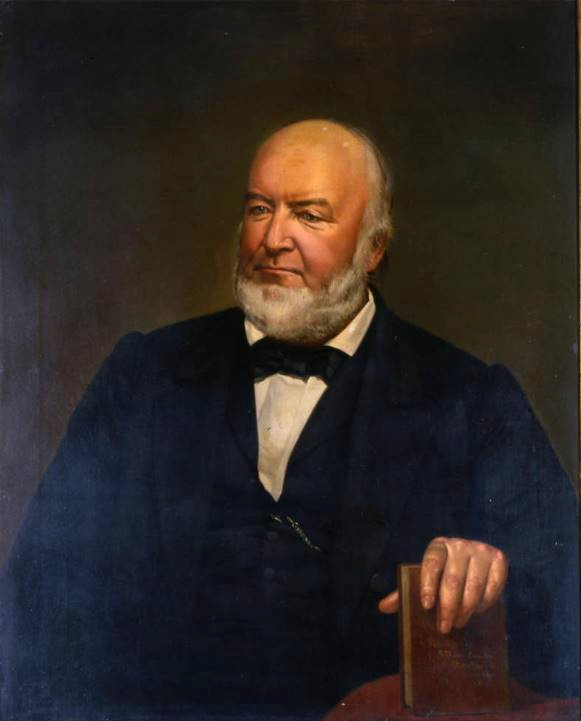
Portrait of Ohio Governor John Brough

Allen Smith Jr. (1810, Rhode Island - 1890, Cleveland, Ohio) was an American portrait painter. He also created some landscapes and genre scenes.

== Biography ==
He grew up in Massachusetts. Later, he went to New York, where he studied with the miniaturist, William Daniel Parisen (1800-1849), while attending antique classes at the American Academy of the Fine Arts. He attended similar classes at the National Academy of Design and continued to exhibit there occasionally from 1832 to 1842. He was an Associate Member until 1860.

In 1835, he joined his parents in Detroit. Three years later, he was in Cincinnati, then returned to New York for a short time, finally settling in Cleveland sometime around 1842. He soon established himself as a popular portrait painter. As a father of eight children, he would often find it necessary to supplement his income by touching up and colorizing photographs for local studios. Following the Panic of 1857, he took a permanent position at the firm of James Fitzallen Ryder (1826-1904), and produced the "best oil painted photographs in Ohio".

He also painted genre scenes, and submitted several to the National Academy and the American Art Union throughout the 1840s and 50s. Only one, "The Young Mechanic" is currently known.

He retired to Lake County in 1882 and devoted his time to painting landscapes in Big Creek Valley.

Some sources credit him as the designer of the first flag of the State of Michigan, which featured a portrait of Governor Stevens T. Mason. None of these flags, or images of them, are known to exist.
