= Alfred Miller (rugby union) =

Irish rugby union player (1859–1923)

- Born: 4 August 1859 Kingstown, Dublin, Ireland
- Died: 4 December 1923 (aged 64) Hatton, Warwickshire, England
- University: Trinity College Dublin

Rugby union career
- Position: Forward
International career
Years	Team	Apps	(Points)
1880–83	Ireland	3	(0)

Alfred Miller (4 August 1859 — 4 December 1923) was an Irish international rugby union player.

Born and raised in Dublin, Miller played varsity rugby during his time at Trinity College Dublin. He was capped three times as a forward for Ireland between 1880 and 1883.

Miller spent his professional career in England, working for many years at the Warwickshire County Mental Hospital, which included 34 years as the Medical Superintendent.

== See also ==
- List of Ireland national rugby union players
