= Alan Paul (author) =

American journalist

- Born: Alan Robert Paul; September 7, 1966 (age 59); Anchorage, Alaska, U.S.
- Education: University of Michigan
- Occupations: Journalist; author; musician; blogger
- Spouse: Rebecca Blumenstein
- Website: alanpaul.net

Alan Robert Paul (born September 7, 1966) is an American journalist, author, musician, and blogger.

== Biography ==
Paul was born in Anchorage, Alaska. He attended the University of Michigan and worked at the Hudson Reporter in Hoboken, New Jersey for one year after graduating in 1988. In 1991, he became Managing Editor of Guitar World and stayed in that job for five years. Paul also took on the duties of senior writer and Online Editor, while writing articles for diverse publications such as SLAM Magazine, The New Yorker, People, and Entertainment Weekly.

He and his wife, Rebecca Blumenstein, moved from New Jersey to China when she was appointed bureau chief for The Wall Street Journal. There he formed the blues quintet Woodie Alan, which he named in honor of the late Allen Woody, as well as making a pop-culture nod to American film autuer Woody Allen. The guitarist was Woodie Wu; the remaining members were made up of two Chinese and one American musician. In May 2008, Woodie Alan was named 'Beijing Band of the Year' in City Weekend Magazine's readers poll. The group began recording sessions for an album that would eventually be released in May 2009 as Beijing Blues.

Paul was named 'Online Columnist of the Year' by The National Society of Newspaper Columnists in honor of his WSJ.com The Expat Life column. One month later, he began covering the Beijing Olympic Games for NBC.com, as the "Beijing Blogger", as well as for the WSJ. He wrote hundreds of posts, covering the Games and events, and how the Olympics were being viewed in Beijing.

In September 2008, Woodie Alan toured outside of Beijing, appearing at the Xiamen Beach Festival. Their performance was recorded and later broadcast on television throughout Fujian Province. They then traveled to Changsha, where they appeared live on three radio shows as well as performed live.

== Publications ==
Big in China: My Unlikely Adventures Raising a Family, Playing the Blues and Becoming a Star in Beijing, Paul's memoir of his time in China was published by Harper in March, 2011. Ivan Reitman's Montecito Pictures optioned the book for a movie, with Reitman attached as director and producer.

In February, 2014, Paul released One Way Out: The Inside History of the Allman Brothers Band (St. Martin's). The product of 25 years of reporting on the band, the book was hailed as a "thorough account" by Rolling Stone and "definitive" by Guitar World. In October 2014, the Allman Brothers played what they called their final shows- six nights at New York's Beacon Theatre. Paul covered the shows extensively, filing reports for Billboard, The Wall Street Journal and Guitar World. The paperback edition of One Way Out was released in February 2015, and included a new final chapter on the band's final year.

Paul and Guitar World writer Andy Aledort wrote Texas Flood: The Inside History of Stevie Ray Vaughan. The book was reviewed by author Alan Light in the December 8, 2019 New York Times Book Review. The review called the book "illuminating," noting that, "An oral history is only as good as its sources, and 'Texas Flood' is thorough and far-reaching, with Vaughan's bandmates, crew and family taking center stage."

Brothers and Sisters: The Allman Brothers Band and the Album That Defined the 70s was published by St. Martin's Press on July 25, 2023. The book, while focused on the Allman Brothers album of the same name, also presents a broader cultural history of the era, covering stories of how the band rescued Jimmy Carter's flailing presidential campaign, Gregg Allman's marriage to Cher, and how the band's success led to an eventual breakup.
