= Allan Miller (footballer) =

Australian rules footballer

Alan Miller

Personal information
- Full name: Alan Rex Miller
- Born: 27 October 1925; Hobart, Tasmania
- Died: 18 March 2006 (aged 80)
- Original team: South Surfers
- Height: 187 cm (6 ft 2 in)
- Weight: 86 kg (190 lb)
- Position: Forward

Playing career^{1}
Years	Club	Games (Goals)
1948–1951	South Melbourne	36 (48)
- ^{1} Playing statistics correct to the end of 1951.

Alan Rex Miller (27 October 1925 – 18 March 2006) was an Australian rules footballer who played for South Melbourne in the Victorian Football League (VFL).

Miller, a forward, was recruited to South Melbourne from South Surfers. He kicked a bag of five goals in just his third league game, against Geelong at Lake Oval. In 1950 he kicked 21 goals for the season and played his last game for the club the following year.

His son, Greg Miller, also played for South Melbourne.
