= Allen Hulsey =

American singer

- Born: Allen Hulsey; Rochester, New York, US
- Genres: Alternative Rock, New wave, Indie
- Occupations: Singer, musician, songwriter, Guitarist, Visual artist, actor
- Instruments: Vocals, Guitar, Bass, Piano, Baglama, Kanun, Midi Guitar, Ableton
- Years active: 2008–present
- Labels: Abaq, Techno & Chill Einmusika, Katermukke, Pipe&Pocket, DiscoTexas

Allen Hulsey is a musician, singer, songwriter, and producer known for blending electronic music with ethnic instruments, in addition to guitar and vocals. Allen is also the founder of Abaq Records, an indie music label and events company.

He has performed worldwide, including at Burning Man, Scorpios Mykonos, and The Brooklyn Mirage.

== Early life ==
Born in Rochester, New York, Hulsey moved to Turkey at the age of 7, at which point he undertook the study of cello and piano. He began playing guitar before attending boarding school in Germany at age 13. At boarding school Allen was introduced to a plethora of more modern music, which he incorporated into his knowledge of classical musics. He also then started to play bowed guitar in order to incorporate his prior knowledge of cello with his guitar playing. His rendition of Saint-Saëns' Le Cygne, later appeared in I'm So Tall, an art film starring Allen and directed by Yael Zeevi, in 2011. Exploring microtonal music and Turkish art/folk music lead him to apply to Berklee College of Music in 2003. Allen studied modern classical music privately, alongside the jazz composition courses he took at Berklee, studying under David Tronzo, Ken Pulig, Yokob Gubanov, and David Fiuczynski.

Upon graduating in 2006, Hulsey moved to New York City. In New York, Allen played with multiple bands, taught and did session work. Allen composed music for modern and traditional dance, performing at the LaMama Moves! Dance festival "World Summit" 2007. For two years Allen played lead guitar for Emperor City Motorcade, with whom he performed on WRXP 101.9 hosted by Matt Pinfield. While with this band he also performed at Bowery Ballroom, Gramercy Theater, Webster Hall, and Mercury Lounge. In 2009, Allen formed Muj with Emre Atabay, his Berklee friend. The duo recorded "Muj 2012", releasing the album in 2010.

== Discography ==
=== Albums ===
- 2016: Whiskey & Blues
- 2025: Hybycozo Dimensions
- 2026: Fables (Upcoming)

=== Singles and EP's ===
- 2016: "Never Ending Night"
- 2017: "Hits You"
- 2018: "Itsula"
- 2018: "East Wind"
- 2018: "Bad Time Stories"
- 2019: "Hey Onbeşli"
- 2020: "Love Is a Colour"
- 2021: "Tell Me What We Are"
- 2022: "Nebraska"
- 2023: "Hold Me"
- 2024: "Dark Emotion"
- 2024: "Shadows of Yesterday"
- 2024: "Island in the Sky"
- 2025: "Hole in The Sky"
- 2025: "Control"

=== Fables (2026) ===
==== Track listing ====
1. "Fables"
2. "Turn Back Home"
3. "Erase"
4. "Lonely Lie"
5. "Cloudswim"
6. "Never Get Enough"
7. "Higher Scenes"
8. "Come Over Again"
9. "Burn Back Down" (with Emre Arisev)
10. "Frozen Fortune"
11. "Goodnight"

=== Remixes ===
- Come Over Again (Damon Jee Remix)
- Erase (Nico Stojan & Tooker Remix) (Sonara)
- Cloudswim (AMANN Remix)

=== Monality (Group) ===
Source:

== Styles and influences ==
Hulsey's styles of guitar playing includes extended guitar techniques such as fretless guitar, slide guitar, prepared guitar. He has been strongly influenced by Erkan Ogur, Fred Frith, David Tronzo, Derek Bailey and John Cage. Allen has also been an admirer of John Lennon and especially Dani Rabin of Marbin. He participates in and is a founding member of yearly tribute to the life and music of John Lennon. The event is held in Central Park on December 8, the anniversary of Lennon's assassination. Performing in the Naumburg Band Shell across from Strawberry Field, hundreds gather each year in the freezing cold to celebrate and remember the music of John Lennon.

Hulsey also has a side project called Monality.

== Instruments and recordings ==
Hulsey primarily plays Fender Stratocaster, Silvertone 1457, twelve-string acoustic and Harmony hollowbody guitars. He uses alternative tuning in most of his songs, including Open G, Open D and C♯ minor tuning. He has solo recordings and has recorded with Geron Hoy, Emperor City Motorcade, Jenn Logue, Ignacio, 6L6, and Muj. Hulsey performed guitar tracks for original music for the movie Rex.

== Select media coverage ==
- Rock'n'Love Editorial – Marie Claire (2009)
- ADAM IN TOWN – Cool People – Allen Hulsey (2013)
- Cumhuriyet Gazetesi (2014)
- Allen Hulsey – İki Defa Düşünme (Don't Think Twice) Live on TRT Genç Yorum (2015)
- Vogue Article (2016)
- Vatan Gazetesi (2016)
- Milliyet Gazetesi (2016)
- Akit Article (2018)
- +90 News Source (2019)
- Onedio (2019)
- Yeni Alanya (2021)
- Forbes Mexico (2023)
- Magnetic (2024)
