= Allen Meadors =

American professor and university administrator

- Born: Allen Coats Meadors; May 17, 1947 (age 79); Van Buren, Arkansas
- Occupations: Professor, administrator

Academic background
- Education: Van Buren Senior High School; University of Central Arkansas

Academic work
- Discipline: Business administration
- Institutions: University of Oklahoma

Allen Coats Meadors (born May 17, 1947) is an American professor and university administrator.

Meadors was Dean of the College of Public Health at the University of Oklahoma and of the College of Health, Social and Public Services at Eastern Washington University, CEO at Penn State Altoona, Chancellor at the University of North Carolina at Pembroke and President of the University of Central Arkansas (UCA). In September 2011, Meadors resigned from UCA.

== Early life and education ==
Allen Meadors was born in Van Buren, Arkansas and attended Van Buren Senior High School, from which he graduated in 1965. He enrolled at the University of Arkansas at Fayetteville before transferring to the University of Central Arkansas, where he graduated with a Bachelor in Business Administration in 1969. After graduating, he returned to the University of Arkansas at Fayetteville to study for an MBA, but again left after one semester to join the United States Air Force.

Meadors obtained a Master's in Business Administration from the University of Northern Colorado and a Master's in Public Administration from the University of Kansas. He also holds Master's Degrees in Psychology and Human Relations and in Health Services Management from Webster University. Meadors was awarded his PhD in Administration and Education by Southern Illinois University in 1981. He also has an Associate's Degree in Computer Science from Saddleback College, and certificates in Health Services Administration from Trinity University and in Health System Management from MIT.

== Academic career ==
Meadors was discharged from the US Air Force in September 1973. He started work for Blue Cross Blue Shield in Topeka, Kansas. In 1976, he was appointed assistant director for public health in Kansas City. He then worked as a health consultant, and as an assistant professor at Southern Illinois University, administering degree programmes on military installations. In 1982, he became associate professor and director of the Division of Health Administration at the University of Texas. Meadors was the executive director of the Northwest Arkansas Radiation Therapy Institute between 1984 and 1987. In 1987, Meadors was appointed as a professor and chair of the Department of Health Administration at the University of Oklahoma. Between 1989 and 1990, he was dean of the College of Public Health at Oklahoma.

Meadors worked as dean of the College of Health, Social and Public Services at Eastern Washington University between 1990 and 1994, after which he was chief executive at Penn State Altoona from 1994 to 1999. He moved to North Carolina to become the new chancellor at the University of North Carolina at Pembroke (UNCP) in 1999. In January 2009, in response to criticism that UNCP (which was founded with a mission to train Native American school teachers) was not doing enough to recruit Native American students, Meadors addressed the Lumbee Tribal Council, outlining a number of initiatives targeting Native American recruits. He reported that the number of Native American students at UNCP had risen from 686 in 1999 to 941 in 2009. In February 2009, Meadors was appointed president of the University of Central Arkansas.

In September 2011, it was reported that the University of Central Arkansas (UCA) board had bought out Meadors's contract, accepted his resignation in return, and replaced him with an interim president, Tom Courtway. The board's actions followed a controversy about renovations and expansion of the university president's house. The university campus food service contractor Aramark had offered to contribute $700,000 to the cost of the renovation. Meadors and board chair Scott Roussel reportedly did not inform the board that the deal involved granting Aramark a new service contract. In January 2013, while working in the United Arab Emirates, Meadors pleaded guilty to violating the Arkansas Freedom of Information Act during his time as the UCA president, after he was "accused of urging a vice president to destroy a letter that said the offer would be in exchange for renewing Aramark's contract". Meadors had originally been charged with tampering with a public document, but reached a negotiated plea bargain for the Arkansas FOIA violation. Roussel also resigned in May 2012, but was not charged with any offense.

Between 2012 and 2014, Meadors was executive director of the United Arab Emirates Higher Education Coordination Council. He has also was president of St. John International University. Meadors was on the board of trustees of the Southeastern Regional Medical Center, a hospital in Lumberton, North Carolina.

== Honors and awards ==
Meadors was a senior fellow of the American Association of State Colleges and Universities in 2011–12. UNCP has established endowed chairs, the Allen C. Meadors Distinguished Professorship in Mathematics and the Allen C. Meadors Endowed Chair in Computer Science, in his honor.

== Personal life ==
Meadors and his wife Barbara have two sons.
