= Alan Millar =

British philosopher

Alan Millar FRSE (born 14 December 1947) is the former Head of Philosophy at the University of Stirling, Scotland.

He earned his PhD at the University of Cambridge and joined the department at Stirling University in 1971. His primary research interests are philosophy of mind and the theory of knowledge. He is a member of the editorial board of The Philosophical Quarterly.

== Works ==
- Reasons and experience (1991)
- Reason and Nature: Essays in the Theory of Rationality (Oxford: Clarendon Press, 2002). Edited with José Luis Bermúdez.
- Understanding People: Normativity and Rationalizing Explanation (Oxford: Clarendon Press, 2004hb, 2008pb).
- Epistemic Value (Oxford: Oxford University Press, 2009) Edited with Adrian Haddock and Duncan Pritchard.
- Social Epistemology (Oxford: Oxford University Press, 2010)Edited with Adrian Haddock and Duncan Pritchard.
- The Nature and Value of Knowledge (Oxford: Oxford University Press, 2010). Co-authored with Adrian Haddock and Duncan Pritchard.
