= Allen Paul (writer) =

American author

- Born: M. Allen Paul III
- Occupations: Author, reporter
- Employer: Associated Press (former)
- Known for: Katyn (1991)

M. Allen Paul III is an American author, former Associated Press reporter and political speech writer. His book Katyn tells the story of three Polish families that were affected by the Katyn Massacre. First published by Charles Scribner's Sons in 1991, Katyn has undergone several revisions. In 2007, the book was revised as a Polish edition entitled: Katyn: Stalin's Massacre and the Triumph of Truth. It is a best seller in Poland.

== Education ==
Paul earned his A.B, degree in English literature from Guilford College in Greensboro, North Carolina. He earned his master's degree in international public policy from the School of Advanced International Studies (SAIS) at Johns Hopkins University.

== Journalism and speech writing careers ==
He worked for the Associated Press and the Raleigh Times, covering various issues. Later he was a speech writer for various members of state and federal government and their staff.

== Writing career ==
Paul became interested in the Katyn Massacre while studying at SAIS in Bologna. When his book was first published in 1991, Katyn was widely acclaimed. The New York Times, Washington Post, Boston Globe, New York Review of Books and many other publications gave it favorable reviews. The Times’ lengthy review included an excerpt from the book describing how the executions were carried out. The review itself was written by Robert Conquest, a leading authority on the history of the Soviet Union. He called the book “a moving reconstruction of the human side of these events. [It] is especially valuable in its tracing of individuals and families through the barbarous darkness of the 1940s." Publishers Weekly called Katyn “A masterful chronicle”; and Kirkus Reviews called the book a “Powerful examination … Well researched and ably written: a fine and harrowing study.” The book was first translated into Polish in 2003. A limited number of books were printed and sold out quickly. A new edition, published in 2006 by the country's largest publisher, Bertelsmann/Poland, became an instant bestseller.

In April, 2008 Paul was awarded the Commander's Cross of the Order of Merit by the President of the Republic of Poland in a special ceremony at the Polish Embassy in Washington, DC.

== Selected works ==
- Allen Paul (1996). Katyń: Stalin's massacre and the seeds of Polish Resurrection. Annapolis, Md., Naval Institute Press. ISBN 1-55750-670-1.
- Allen Paul (1991). Katyn: The Untold Story of Stalin's Polish Massacre. New York, Scribner Book Company. ISBN 0-684-19215-2.
