= Alfred Henry Miller =

American football player (1904–1967)

Profile
- Positions: Fullback, halfback, quarterback

Personal information
- Born: March 17, 1904; Boston, Massachusetts, U.S.
- Died: December 20, 1967 (aged 63); Detroit, Michigan, U.S.
- Listed height: 5 ft 11 in (1.80 m)
- Listed weight: 210 lb (95 kg)

Career information
- High school: Worcester Academy (Worcester, Massachusetts)
- College: Harvard

Career history
- Boston Bulldogs (1929)
- Stats at Pro Football Reference

Alfred Henry "Truck" Miller (March 17, 1904 – December 20, 1967), also known as Al Miller, was an American professional football halfback who spent one season in the National Football League (NFL) with the Boston Bulldogs in 1929. He was born in Boston, Massachusetts.,

He attended Worcester Academy (Class of 1923) and played college football at Harvard University (Class of 1927). Miller was one of the earliest Jewish players in the NFL.

== Sources ==
- Worcester Academy
- Roster of 1929 Boston Bulldog Players
