= Allen R. Miller =

American mathematician (1942–2010)

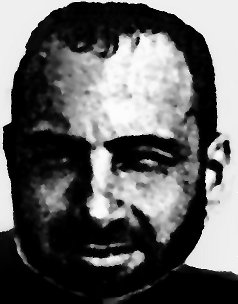
- Born: December 2, 1942; Brooklyn, New York, U.S.
- Died: August 15, 2010 (aged 67)
- Education: Brooklyn College, University of Maryland
- Scientific career
- Fields: Mathematics
- Workplaces: Ballistics Research Laboratory, Aberdeen Proving Ground, Naval Research Laboratory, George Washington University

Allen R. Miller (December 2, 1942 – August 15, 2010) was an American mathematician.

Miller was a major contributor to the field of special functions, especially confluent hypergeometric functions.

== Biography ==
A native of Brooklyn, New York, Miller attended George W. Wingate High School and Brooklyn College, where he graduated in 1965 with a degree in mathematics. Miller began his professional career at the Ballistics Research Laboratory at the Aberdeen Proving Ground, where he worked with physicist Jane Dewey. In 1967, he moved to the Naval Research Laboratory, where he developed high-fidelity mathematical models of interactions between physical systems and electromagnetic fields. Unlike most pure mathematicians of the time, Miller implemented simulations of his models on early supercomputers. In the 1970s, Miller was recognized not only as a leading mathematician but also as an expert on the CRAY line of supercomputers.

Miller maintained an academic affiliation with George Washington University as an adjunct professor after retiring from the Naval Research Laboratory in 1991. He published actively until his death from a pulmonary embolism on August 15, 2010.

== Contributions ==
=== Special functions ===
Miller made numerous contributions in the area of special functions and addressed several significant open problems. Notable among these is his work with Emanuel Vegh in formulating an exact closed-form solution for the grazing angle for specular reflection on a sphere (Alhazen's problem).

=== Mathematical models ===
The Miller-Brown-Vegh model (developed at NRL) is commonly used to describe scattering from the ocean surface. It has been adopted in the US Navy's models for propagation over the ocean and appears in the Radar Handbook.

=== Computer security and information theory ===
Miller, with Ira S. Moskowitz, contributed to the mathematical analysis of covert channels in computer security. He showed how special functions could simplify the Shannon channel capacity's closed form and how the difference of divergent series could be used to express channel capacity in certain physical situations that arise in anonymity networks.

== Impact ==
Allen Miller published around 60 peer-reviewed journal articles and numerous other non-refereed technical reports and articles. His results have been applied in robotics, computer graphics, decision theory, and sensors. Miller received three Alan Berman Research Publication Awards from the Naval Research Laboratory.
