= Allen Apsley =

Allen Apsley may refer to:

- Sir Allen Apsley (administrator) (1582–1630), English merchant, courtier and landowner, lord of the manor of Feltwell
- Sir Allen Apsley (Royalist) (1616–1683), his son, Royalist in the English Civil War
- Allen Bathurst, Lord Apsley (1895–1942), British Member of Parliament for Southampton and Bristol Central
