= Samuel Lamb =

Chinese Protestant pastor

- Born: October 4, 1924; Guangzhou, China
- Died: August 3, 2013 (aged 88); Guangzhou, China
- Occupation: Chinese house church leader
- Religion: Protestant Christianity

Samuel Lamb or Lin Xiangao (simplified Chinese: 林献羔; traditional Chinese: 林獻羔; pinyin: Lín Xiàn-gāo; Wade–Giles: Lin^{2} Hsian^{4}-Kao^{1}; October 4, 1924 – August 3, 2013) was a Protestant pastor in Guangzhou, China. He was a leader in the Chinese house church movement and known for his resistance against the state-sanctioned Three-Self Patriotic Movement (TSPM).

== Biography ==
Lamb was born in a mountainous area overlooking Macau. His father, Paul Lamb, was the pastor of a small Baptist congregation. In the 1940s, Lamb worked with pastor Wang Mingdao.

Lamb was imprisoned for more than 20 years (1955–57; 1958–78) for his refusal to join the TSPM. In spite of "honey-bucket" duty at labor farms or backbreaking work in coal mines at labor camps, Lamb continued to teach.

In 1978, Lamb was released from prison and, in 1979, he restarted the church in 35 Da Ma Zhan, Guangzhou. Because the attendance grew quickly, he then moved the meetings to 15 Rong Gui Li, De Zheng Bei Road. The house church is now known as Rongguili Church, under the name Damazhan Evangelical Church. The house church continued to hold four main services each week, with an estimated attendance of four to five thousand, but was closed on October 14, 2018, and a second time on December 15, 2018.

Starting in 1979, Lamb published a series of booklets called "Voice of the Spirit" (Chinese: 灵音小丛书; pinyin: Líng yīn xiǎo cóngshū); now there are more than 200 booklets.

He died in Guangzhou in 2013, aged 88. For reasons of security and site elements, the date of the farewell ceremony was changed from August 17, 2013, to August 16, 2013, in Baiyun Hall, Yinhe park, Yinhe cemetery, Guangzhou. There were nearly 30,000 mourners in attendance.

== Views ==
Lamb preached theologically conservative teachings. His refusal to register his church with the Chinese government and join the TSPM was due to his strong support of the separation of church and state.

== See also ==
- House church (China)
- Protestantism in China
