= Kingdom of Israel (united monarchy) =

United kingdom of Israel and Judah (10th c. BCE)

Kingdom of Israel 𐤉𐤔𐤓𐤀𐤋
- c. 1047 – c. 930 BCE
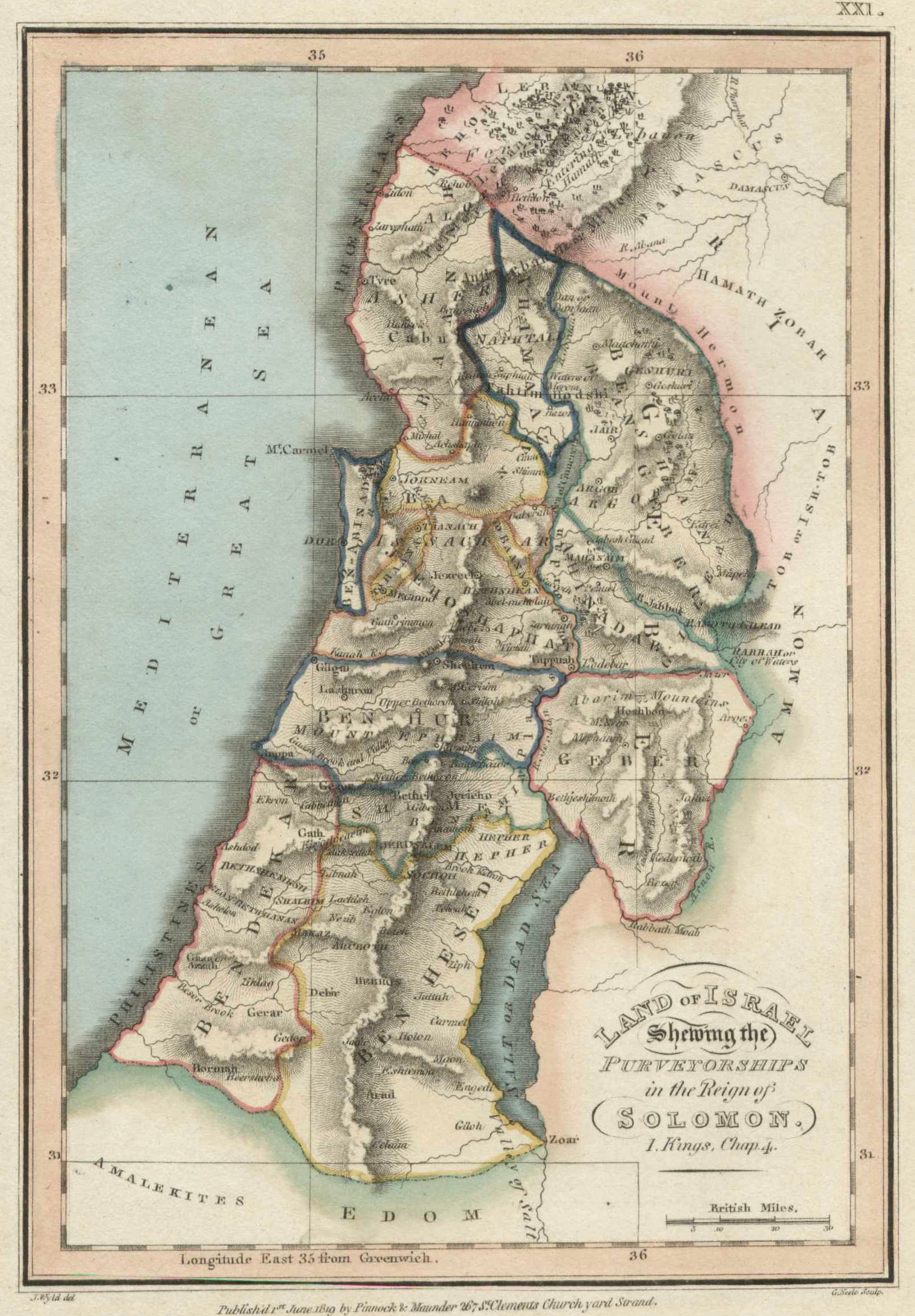
- Land of Israel Shewing the Purveyorships in the Reign of Solomon, published by James Wyld in 1819 based on the Books of Kings
- Common languages: Hebrew, Aramaic
- Religion: Ancient Semitic religion, (Note: Canaanite; Mesopotamian; Near East folk religions) Yahwism
- Demonym: Israelite
- Government: Hereditary theocratic absolute monarchy
- Kings
  - 1047–1010 BCE: Saul
  - 1010–1008: Ish-bosheth
  - 1008–970: David
  - 970–931: Solomon
  - 931–930: Rehoboam
- Historical era: Iron Age
  - Ascension of Saul: c. 1047 BCE
  - Jeroboam's Revolt: 930 BCE
Preceded by	Succeeded by
Twelve Tribes of Israel	Kingdom of Israel; Kingdom of Judah
- Today part of: Israel; Palestine (West Bank); Jordan; Lebanon; Syria

The Kingdom of Israel (Hebrew: מַמְלֶכֶת יִשְׂרָאֵל, Mamleḵeṯ Yīśrāʾēl) was an Israelite kingdom in the Southern Levant in antiquity. The first extra-biblical mention of Israel dates from the Merneptah Stele created by Pharaoh Merneptah in 1208 BCE. According to the Deuteronomistic history in the Hebrew Bible, the United Kingdom of Israel or the United Monarchy existed under the reigns of Saul, Ish-bosheth, David, and Solomon, encompassing the territories of both the later kingdoms of Judah and Israel.

The extent and nature of the Israelites' United Monarchy are matters of ongoing academic debate. During the 1980s, some biblical scholars began to argue that the archaeological evidence for an extensive kingdom before the late 8th century BCE is too weak, and that the methodology used to obtain the evidence is flawed.

Today the majority of scholars accept the existence of a polity ruled by David and Solomon, albeit on a more modest scale than described in the Bible. Most scholars believe that David and Solomon reigned over large sections of Cisjordan and probably parts of Transjordan. Nonetheless scholars remain divided among those who support the historicity of the biblical narrative, those who doubt or dismiss it, and those who support the kingdom's theoretical existence while maintaining that the biblical narrative is exaggerated. Proponents of the kingdom's existence traditionally date it to between c. 1047 BCE and c. 930 BCE.

In the 1990s, Israeli archaeologist Israel Finkelstein contended that existing archaeological evidence for the United Monarchy in the 10th century BCE should be dated to the 9th century BCE. This model placed the biblical kingdom in Iron Age I, suggesting that it was not functioning as a country under centralized governance but rather as tribal chiefdom over a small polity in Judah, disconnected from the north's Israelite tribes. The rival chronology of Israeli archaeologist Amihai Mazar places the relevant period beginning in the early 10th century BCE and ending in the mid-9th century BCE, addressing the problems of the traditional chronology while still aligning pertinent findings with the time of Saul, David, and Solomon. Mazar's chronology and the traditional chronology have been fairly widely accepted, though there is no current consensus on the topic. Recent archaeological discoveries by Israeli archaeologists Eilat Mazar and Yosef Garfinkel in Jerusalem and Khirbet Qeiyafa, respectively, seem to support the existence of the United Monarchy, but the dating and identifications are not universally accepted. The historicity of Solomon and his rule is the subject of significant debate. Current scholarly consensus allows for a historical Solomon, but regards his reign as king over Israel and Judah in the 10th century BCE as uncertain and the biblical portrayal of his apparent empire's opulence as most probably an anachronistic exaggeration.

According to the biblical account, on the succession of Solomon's son Rehoboam, the United Monarchy split into two separate kingdoms: the Kingdom of Israel in the north, containing the cities of Shechem and Samaria; and the Kingdom of Judah in the south, containing Jerusalem and the Jewish Temple.

== Archaeological record ==
In the 1980s, a few biblical scholars began to assert that the archaeological evidence for an extensive kingdom before the late 8th century BCE is too weak, and that the methodology used to obtain the evidence is flawed. In 1995 and 1996, Israel Finkelstein published two papers where he proposed a Low Chronology for the stratigraphy of Iron Age Israel. Finkelstein's model would push stratigraphic dates assigned by the conventional chronology by up to a century later, so Finkelstein concluded that much of the monumental architecture characterizing Israel in the 10th century BCE that biblical United Monarchy has been traditionally associated with instead belongs to the 9th century. Finkelstein wrote that "Accepting the Low Chronology means stripping the United Monarchy of monumental buildings, including ashlar masonry and proto-Ionic capitals". According to Finkelstein and Neil Silberman, the authors of The Bible Unearthed, ideas of a united monarchy is not accurate history but "creative expressions of a powerful religious reform movement" that are possibly "based on certain historical kernels." Finkelstein and Silberman accept that David and Solomon were real kings of Judah around the 10th century BCE, but they cite the fact that the earliest independent reference to the Kingdom of Israel dates to about 890 BCE and that to the Kingdom of Judah dates to about 750 BCE. Some see the united monarchy as fabricated during the Babylonian Exile transforming David and Solomon from local folk heroes into rulers of international status. Finkelstein has posited a potential United Monarchy under Jeroboam II in the 8th century BCE, whereas the former one was potentially invented during the reign of Josiah to justify his territorial expansion.

Finkelstein's views have been strongly criticized by Amihai Mazar; in response, Mazar proposed the Modified Conventional Chronology, which places the beginning of the Iron IIA period in the early 10th century and its end in the mid-9th century, solving the problems of the High Chronology while still dating the archeological discoveries to the 10th century BCE. Finkelstein's Low Chronology and views about the monarchy have received strong criticism from other scholars, including Amnon Ben-Tor, William G. Dever, Kenneth Kitchen, Doron Ben-Ami, Raz Kletter and Lawrence Stager.

Though Amélie Kuhrt acknowledges that "there are no royal inscriptions from the time of the united monarchy (indeed very little written material altogether) and not a single contemporary reference to either David or Solomon," she concludes, "Against this must be set the evidence for substantial development and growth at several sites, which is plausibly related to the tenth century." Kenneth Kitchen (University of Liverpool) reaches a similar conclusion, arguing that "the physical archaeology of tenth-century Canaan is consistent with the former existence of a unified state on its terrain."

On August 4, 2005, archaeologist Eilat Mazar announced that she had discovered in Jerusalem what may have been the palace of King David. Now referred to as the Large Stone structure, Mazar's discovery consists of a public building she dated from the 10th century BCE, a copper scroll, pottery from the same period, and a clay bulla, or inscribed seal, of Jehucal, son of Shelemiah, son of Shevi, an official mentioned at least twice in the Book of Jeremiah. In July 2008, she also found a second bulla, belonging to Gedaliah ben Pashhur, who is mentioned together with Jehucal in Jeremiah 38:1. Amihai Mazar called the find "something of a miracle." He has said that he believes the building may be the Fortress of Zion that David is said to have captured. Other scholars are skeptical that the foundation walls are from David's palace. Garfinkel also claimed to have discovered David's palace in 2013, 25 kilometres away, at Khirbet Qeiyafa.

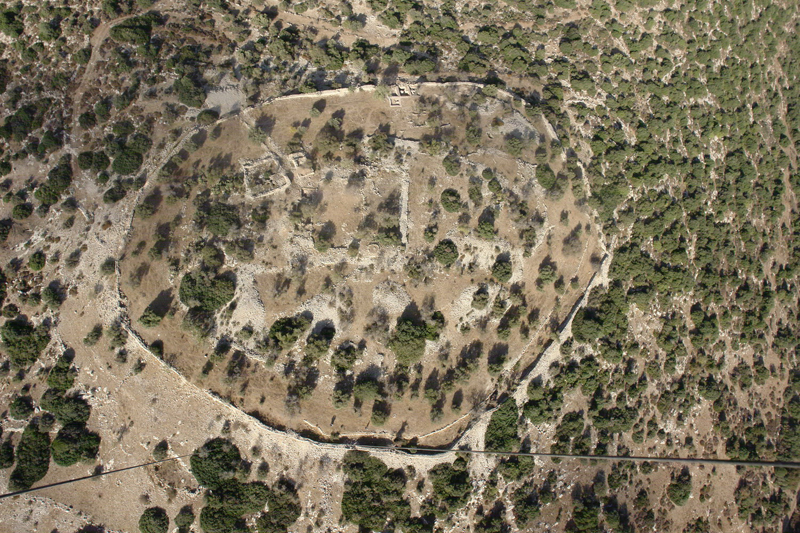
Aerial view of Khirbet Qeiyafa, an archaeological site in modern-day Israel (2008)

Excavations at Khirbet Qeiyafa, an Iron Age site in Judah, found an urbanized settlement radiocarbon dated well before scholars such as Finkelstein suggest that urbanization had begun in Judah, which supports the existence of an urbanized kingdom in the 10th century BCE. The Israel Antiquities Authority stated, "The excavations at Khirbat Qeiyafa reveal an urban society that existed in Judah already in the late eleventh century BCE. It can no longer be argued that the Kingdom of Judah developed only in the late eighth century BCE or at some other later date." The techniques and interpretations to reach some conclusions related to Khirbet Qeiyafa have been criticized by some scholars, such as Finkelstein and Alexander Fantalkin.

In 2010, archaeologist Eilat Mazar announced the discovery of part of the ancient city walls around the City of David, which she believes dates to the tenth century BCE. According to Mazar, "It's the most significant construction we have from First Temple days in Israel," and "It means that at that time, the 10th century, in Jerusalem, there was a regime capable of carrying out such construction." The 10th century is the period the Bible describes as the reign of King Solomon. Not all archaeologists agree with Mazar, and archaeologist Aren Maeir is dubious about such claims and Mazar's dating.

In the Jewish Study Bible (2014), Oded Lipschits states the concept of United Monarchy should be abandoned, while Aren Maeir believes there is insufficient evidence in support of the United Monarchy. In August 2015, Israeli archaeologists discovered massive fortifications in the ruins of the ancient city of Gath, supposed birthplace of Goliath. The size of the fortifications shows that Gath was a large city in the 10th century BCE, perhaps the largest in Canaan at the time. The professor leading the dig, Aren Maeir, estimated that Gath was as much as four times the size of contemporary Jerusalem, which cast doubt that David's kingdom could have been as powerful as described in the Bible.

In his book, The Forgotten Kingdom (2013), Israel Finkelstein considered that Saul, originally from the Benjamin territory, had gained power in his natal Gibeon region around the 10th century BCE and that he conquered Jerusalem in the south and Shechem to the north, creating a polity dangerous to Egypt's geopolitical intentions. So, Shoshenq I, from Egypt, invaded the territory and destroyed this new polity, and installed David of Bethlehem in Jerusalem (Judah) and Jeroboam I in Shechem (Israel) as small local rulers who were vassals of Egypt. Finkelstein concludes that the memory of a united monarchy was inspired by Saul's conquered territory serving first the ideal of a great united monarchy ruled by a northern king in the times of Jeroboam II and next to the idea of a united monarchy ruled from Jerusalem.

In an article on the Biblical Archaeology Review, William G. Dever strongly criticized Finkelstein's theory, calling it full of "numerous errors, misrepresentations, over-simplifications and contradictions." Dever noted that Finkelstein proposes that Saul ruled a polity extending as far north as Jezreel and as far south as Hebron and reaching a border with Gath, with a capital located in Gibeon rather than Jerusalem. According to Dever, such a polity is a united monarchy in its own right, ironically confirming the biblical tradition. In addition, he rejected the notion that Gibeon was the capital of such polity since there is "no clear archaeological evidence of occupation in the tenth century, much less monumental architecture." Dever went as far as to dismiss Finkelstein's theory as "a product of his fantasy, stemmed by his obsession to prove that Saul, David and Solomon were not real kings and that the United Monarchy is an invention of a Judahite-biased biblical writer." Dever concluded by stating that "Finkelstein has not discovered a forgotten kingdom. He had invented it. The careful reader will nevertheless gain some insights into Israel—Israel Finkelstein, that is."

Another more moderate review was written in the same magazine by Aaron Burke: Burke described Finkelstein's book as "ambitious" and praised its literary style but did not accept his conclusions: according to Burke, Finkelstein's thesis is mainly based on his proposed Low Chronology, ignoring the criticism that it has received from scholars like Amihai Mazar, Christopher Bronk Ramsey and others, and engages in several speculations that archeology, biblical and extrabiblical sources cannot prove. He also criticized him for persistently trying to downgrade the role of David in the development of ancient Israel.

In his books, Beyond the Texts (2018) and Has Archeology Buried the Bible? (2020), William G. Dever has defended the historicity of the United Monarchy, maintaining that the reigns of Saul, David and Solomon are "reasonably well attested." Similar arguments were advanced by Amihai Mazar in two essays written in 2010 and 2013, which point toward archaeological evidence emerged from excavation sites in Jerusalem by Eilat Mazar and in Khirbet Qeiyafa by Yosef Garfinkel.

The archaeologist Avraham Faust, reviewing Beyond the Texts stated "Dever's view of the historicity of the united monarchy, which will probably be the main interest of many readers, is that the state or states appeared in the early tenth century but should be defined as 'early inchoate state' (363), not the empire described in the Bible."

In 2018, Faust announced that his excavations at Tel 'Eton (believed to be the biblical Eglon) had uncovered an elite house (which he referred to as "the governor's residency"), whose foundations were dated by carbon-14 analysis in the late 11th–10th century BCE, the time usually ascribed to Saul, David and Solomon. Such dating would strengthen the thesis that a centralized state existed at the time of David.

According to Dever (2021), 10th century Judah was "something like in 'early inchoate state,' one that will not be fully consolidated until the 9th century BCE" while Israel had a separate development.

According to Zachary Thomas (2021), "So whatever your view of the historicity of the biblical account may be, it is anachronistic to understand kingdoms like the United Monarchy as states." That is, David had a "patrimonial kingdom", not a "bureaucratic state". Further complicated by the idea that many of his subjects might have been nomads (nomads being "invisible" to archaeology).

In their book, The Bible's First Kings (2025), Avraham Faust and Zev Farber have argued that the United Monarchy was a historical mini-empire and that archaeological evidence and early biblical traditions attest to its emergence in the 10th century BCE. Faust and Farber say that as of 2025 Bible scholars embrace radical skepticism about the United Monarchy, but archaeologists do not.

== Historical sources ==
According to mainstream source criticism, several contrasting source texts were spliced together to produce the current Books of Samuel. The most prominent sections in the early parts of the first book come from a pro-monarchical source and from an anti-monarchical source. By identifying both sources, two separate accounts can be reconstructed.

The pro-monarchical source describes the divinely-appointed birth of Saul (a single word being changed by a later editor so that it referred to Samuel) and his leading of an army to victory over the Ammonites, which resulted in the people clamouring for him to lead them against the Philistines when he is appointed king.

Many scholars believe that the Books of Samuel exhibit too many anachronisms to have been a contemporary account. For example, the text mentions later armour (1 Samuel 17:4–7, 38–39; 25:13), the use of camels (1 Samuel 30:17), cavalry (as distinct from chariotry) (1 Samuel 13:5, 2 Samuel 1:6), and iron picks and axes (as if they were prevalent) (2 Samuel 12:31).

Most scholars believe that the text of the Books of Samuel was compiled in the 8th century BCE - rather than in the 10th century when most of the events described took place - based on historical and legendary sources. The narrative served primarily to fill the gap in Israelite history after the events described in Deuteronomy.

== Biblical narrative ==
=== Origin ===
According to the biblical account, the united monarchy was formed when the elders of Israel expressed the desire for a king. God and Samuel seem to have a distaste for the monarchy, with God telling Samuel that "[Israel has] rejected me, that I should not be king over them." However, Samuel still proceeds with the establishment of a monarchy by anointing Saul.

In the First Book of Samuel, Saul's disobedience prompts Yahweh to curtail his reign and to hand his kingdom over to another dynasty, leading to Saul's death in battle against the Philistines. His heir Ish-bosheth rules for only two years before being assassinated. Though David was only the King of Judah, he ends the conspiracy and is appointed King of Israel in Ish-bosheth's place. Some textual critics and biblical scholars suggest that David was responsible for the assassination and that his innocence was a later invention to legitimize his actions.

Israel rebels against David and crowns David's son Absalom. David is forced into exile east of the Jordan River but eventually launches a successful counterattack, which results in the death of Absalom. Having retaken Judah and asserted control over Israel, David returns west of the Jordan.

=== Golden age ===
Throughout the monarchy of Saul, the capital is in Gibeah. After Saul's death, Ish-bosheth rules over the Kingdom of Israel from Mahanaim, and David establishes the capital of the Kingdom of Judah in Hebron.

After the civil war with Saul, David forges a powerful and unified Israelite monarchy and rules from c. 1000 to 961 BCE. Some modern archaeologists, however, believe that the two distinct cultures and geographic entities of Judah and Israel continued uninterrupted, and if a political union between them existed, it might have had no practical effect on their relationship.

In the biblical account, David embarks on successful military campaigns against the enemies of Judah and Israel and defeats such regional entities as the Philistines to secure his borders. Israel grows from kingdom to empire, its military and political sphere of influence expanding to control the weaker client states of Philistia, Moab, Edom and Ammon, with Aramaean city-states Aram-Zobah and Aram-Damascus becoming vassal states.

David is succeeded by his son Solomon, who obtains the throne in a somewhat-disreputable manner from the rival claimant Adonijah, his elder brother. Like David's Palace, Solomon's temple is designed and built with the assistance of Tyrian architects, skilled labourers, money, jewels, cedar and other goods obtained in exchange for land ceded to Tyre.

Solomon goes on to rebuild numerous significant cities, including Megiddo, Hazor and Gezer. Some scholars have attributed aspects of archaeological remains excavated from these sites, including six-chambered gates and ashlar palaces, to the building programme. However, Israel Finkelstein's Low Chronology would propose to date them to the 9th century BCE. Yigael Yadin later concluded that the stables that had been believed to have served Solomon's vast collection of horses were built by King Ahab in the 9th century BCE.

=== Collapse and split ===
Map of Israel and Judah after the collapse of the United Monarchy, showing the Northern Kingdom in blue and the Southern Kingdom in light red (9th century BCE)

Following Solomon's death in c. 926 BCE, tensions between the northern part of Israel, containing the ten northern tribes, and the southern section, dominated by Jerusalem and the southern tribes, reached a boiling point. When Solomon's son and successor Rehoboam dealt tactlessly with economic complaints of the northern tribes, in about 930 BCE (there are differences of opinion as to the actual year), the Kingdom of Israel and Judah splits into two kingdoms: the northern Kingdom of Israel, which included the cities of Shechem and Samaria, and the southern Kingdom of Judah, which contained Jerusalem.

The Kingdom of Israel (or the Northern Kingdom or Samaria) existed as an independent state until 722 BCE when it was conquered by the Neo-Assyrian Empire. The Kingdom of Judah (or the Southern Kingdom) existed as an independent state until 586 BCE when it was conquered by the Neo-Babylonian Empire.

== Biblical chronology ==
Scholars have not fully agreed on when the period started or begun. Most biblical scholars follow either of the older chronologies established by American archaeologists William F. Albright and Edwin R. Thiele or the newer one by Israeli historian Gershon Galil. Thiele's chronology generally corresponds with Galil's chronology below, with a difference of one year at most.

Monarch	Albright–Thiele dates	Galil dates	Hebrew dates	Notes
House of Saul
Saul (שָׁאוּל; Šāʾūl)	c. 1021–1000 BCE	c. 1030–1010 BCE	c. 3064/3094–3104	Committed suicide during the battle
Ish-bosheth (אֶשְׁבַּעַל; ʾEšbaʿal)	c. 1000 BCE	c. 1010–1008 BCE	c. 3104-3106	Son of Saul and Ahinoam; assassinated
House of David
David (דָּוִד; Dāvīd)	c. 1000–962 BCE	c. 1008–970 BCE	c. 3106/3112–3145	Son-in-law of Saul and brother-in-law of Ish-bosheth
Solomon (שְׁלֹמֹה; Šəlōmō)	c. 962–922 BCE	c. 970–931 BCE	c. 3145–3185	Son of David and Bathsheba
Rehoboam (רְחַבְעָם; Rəḥavʿām)	c. 922–921 BCE	c. 931–930 BCE	c. 3185	Son of Solomon and Naamah

== See also ==
- Judaism
- Greater Israel
- History of ancient Israel and Judah
- Historicity of the Bible
  - Chronology of the Bible
- List of Jewish states and dynasties
