= The Message and the Kingdom =

1997 book by Richard A. Horsley and Neil Asher Silberman

- Title page for The Message and the Kingdom: How Jesus and Paul Ignited a Revolution and Transformed the Ancient World (1997)
- Author: Richard A. Horsley; Neil Asher Silberman
- Language: English
- Genre: Non-fiction
- Publisher: Grosset/Putnam
- Publication date: 1997
- Publication place: United States

The Message and the Kingdom: How Jesus and Paul Ignited a Revolution and Transformed the Ancient World (New York: Grossett/Putnam. Reprint, Minneapolis: Fortress) is a 1997 book by the Americans New Testament scholar from the University of Massachusetts Boston, Richard A. Horsley and Neil Asher Silberman, an archaeologist, historian and contributing editor to Archaeology Magazine. It is a historical account of Christianity in the 1st century that portrays the quest for the kingdom of God by Jesus, Paul, and the earliest churches as both a spiritual journey and a political response to the "mindless acts of violence, inequality, and injustice that characterized the kings of men."

Following the traditional prophetic pattern, Jesus pronounced God's judgment against the rulers in Jerusalem and their Roman patrons. This confrontation with the Jerusalem rulers and his martyrdom at the hands of the Roman governor, however, became the breakthrough that empowered the rapid expansion of his movement in the immediately ensuing decades. In Jerusalem the Twelve told of post death appearances of Jesus, which were seen as vindicating his cause as a righteous martyr, providing assurance of the victory over Rome and signalling the first step in the general resurrection – the era of Israel’s salvation was already inaugurated. The values of the village renewal movement (sharing, reciprocity, independence) were applied to urban life and the Jerusalem community adopted the mission of extending the renewal to the diaspora communities. As the movement spread it also attracted non-Israelites who found in the Jesus movement an alternative community and identity.

Saul/Paul of Tarsus had a vision that persuaded him to deliver Jesus’ message throughout the Roman Empire. Paul created communities that rejected patron-client relationships as the paradigm for community and instead embodied the Spirit led ideals of mutual support, love and sharing. Paul’s communities focussed on Christ as the Lord whose resurrection made a mockery of Roman claims to power (crucifixion was Rome’s violent and public means of enforcing its rule, but Christ had proven greater than Rome) and who would soon return to destroy Roman power, judge the nations and establish God’s kingdom on earth. Paul’s collection for the famine stricken Judaean Christians was intended as a powerful expression of the independence from Roman rule that communal solidarity could bring for it would free Judaean Christians from dependence on wealthy patrons. The offering in Paul’s mind would fulfil the prophetic vision of representatives from all the nations bringing gifts to Jerusalem and would usher in the return of Christ. But rather than ushering in the return and reign of Christ, Paul’s journey to Jerusalem issued only in his death and the continued oppressive presence of Rome.

The authors argue that after the First Roman-Jewish War, the Christian movement began to adapt to the continued presence of Rome.

The values of mutual support, love and sharing were embodied internally in the institutions of the Christian community but the State came to be seen as a power with which the Christian faith could coexist until the return of Christ, and by the 4th century State and Church were integrated. However, the quest for the Kingdom of God and the resistance to oppression continued (and continues) to exist in Christianity.
