= Richard A. Horsley =

American New Testament scholar

Richard A. Horsley was the Distinguished Professor of Liberal Arts and the Study of Religion at the University of Massachusetts Boston until his retirement in 2007.

He described his view of the historical Jesus in these words (Jesus and the Spiral of Violence, pp. 207–208):

The focal concern of the kingdom of God in Jesus’ preaching and practice, however, is the liberation and welfare of the people. Jesus’ understanding of the "kingdom of God" is similar in its broader perspective to the confident hopes expressed in then-contemporary Jewish apocalyptic literature. That is, he had utter confidence that God was restoring the life of the society, and that this would mean judgment for those who oppressed the people and vindication for those who faithfully adhered to God’s will and responded to the kingdom. That is, God was imminently and presently effecting a historical transformation. In modern parlance that would be labeled a "revolution."

Horsley has a PhD from Harvard and previously taught at Wesleyan University.

== Bibliography ==
- 1970. "Paul and the Pneumatikoi: First Corinthians Investigated in Terms of the Conflict between Two Different Religious Mentalities." PhD diss., Harvard University.
- 1985. With John S. Hanson. Bandits, Prophets, and Messiahs: Popular Movements in the Time of Jesus. Minneapolis: Winston. Reprint, Harrisburg, PA: Trinity, 1999.
- 1987. Jesus and the Spiral of Violence: Popular Jewish Resistance in Roman Palestine. San Francisco: Harper & Row. Reprint, Minneapolis: Fortress, 1993.
- 1988. Sociology and the Jesus Movement. New York: Crossroad.
- 1989. The Liberation of Christmas: The Infancy Narratives in Social Context. New York: Crossroad. Reprint, Eugene, OR: Wipf & Stock, 2006.
- 1995. Galilee: History, Politics, People. Harrisburg, PA: Trinity.
- 1996. Archaeology, History, and Society in Galilee: The Social Context of Jesus and the Rabbis. Harrisburg, PA: Trinity.
- 1997. And Neil Asher Silberman. The Message and the Kingdom: How Jesus and Paul Ignited a Revolution and Transformed the Ancient World. New York: Grossett/Putnam. Reprint, Minneapolis: Fortress, 2002.
- 1997. Editor. Paul and Empire: Religion and Power in Roman Imperial Society. Harrisburg, PA: Trinity.
- 1998. 1 Corinthians. Abingdon New Testament Commentaries. Nashville: Abingdon.
- 1999. With Jonathan A. Draper. Whoever Hears You Hears Me: Prophets, Performance, and Tradition in Q. Harrisburg, PA: Trinity.
- 2001. Hearing the Whole Story: The Politics of Plot in Mark's Gospel. Louisville: Westminster John Knox.
- 2003. Jesus and Empire: The Kingdom of God and the New World Disorder. Minneapolis: Fortress.
- 2003. And Tom Thatcher. John, Jesus, and the Renewal of Israel. Grand Rapids: Eerdmans.
- 2003. Religion and Empire: People, Power, and the Life of the Spirit. Facets. Minneapolis: Fortress.
- 2004. Editor. Hidden Transcripts and the Arts of Resistance: Applying the Work of James C. Scott to Jesus and Paul. Semeia Studies 48. Atlanta: Society of Biblical Literature.
- 2004. Paul and the Roman Imperial Order. New York: Trinity.
- 2005. Editor. Christian Origins. A People's History of Christianity 1. Minneapolis: Fortress.
- 2006. Editor. Oral Performance, Popular Tradition, and Hidden Transcript in Q. Semeia Studies 60. Atlanta: Society of Biblical Literature.
- 2007. Scribes, Visionaries, and the Politics of Second Temple Judea. Louisville: Westminster John Knox.
- 2008. Jesus in Context: Power, People, and Performance. Minneapolis: Fortress.
- 2008. Wisdom and Spiritual at Corinth: Studies in First Corinthians. Eugene, OR: Cascade Books.
- 2009. Covenant Economics: A Biblical Vision of Justice for All. Louisville: Westminster John Knox.
- 2010. Revolt of the Scribes: Resistance and Apocalyptic Origins. Minneapolis: Fortress.
- 2011. Jesus and the Powers: Conflict, Covenant, and the Hope of the Poor. Minneapolis: Fortress.
- 2012. With Patrick A. Tiller. After Apocalyptic and Wisdom: Rethinking Texts in Context. Eugene, OR: Cascade Books.
- 2012. The Prophet Jesus and the Renewal of Israel: Moving beyond Diversionary Debate. Grand Rapids: Eerdmans.
- 2013. Jesus and the Politics of Roman Palestine. Columbia: University of South Carolina Press.
- 2013. Text and Tradition in Performance and Writing. Biblical Performance Criticism Series 9. Eugene, OR: Cascade Books.
- 2014. Jesus and Magic: Freeing the Gospel Stories from Modern Misconceptions. Eugene, OR: Cascade Books.

Publications by Richard A. Horsley by year

1976 Horsley, Richard A. “Pneumatikos vs. Psychikos: Distinctions of Spiritual Status among the Corinthians.” Harvard Theological Review 69 (1976): 269-88. ——. Review of Property and Riches in the Early Church: Aspects of a Social History of Early Christianity, by Martin Hengel, Journal of the American Academy of Religion 44.3 (1976): 568-9.

1977 ——. “Wisdom of Word and Words of Wisdom in Corinth.” Catholic Biblical Quarterly 39 (1977): 224-39.

1978 ——. “Consciousness and Freedom among the Corinthians: 1 Corinthians 8-10.” Catholic Biblical Quarterly 40 (1978): 574-89. ——. “The Background of the Confessional Formula in 1 Kor 8:6.” Zeitschrift für die neutestamentliche Wissenschaft und die Kunde der älteren Kirche 69 (1978): 130-35. ——. “The Law of Nature in Philo and Cicero.” Harvard Theological Review 71 (1978): 35-59. ——. “How Can Some of You Say That There is No Resurrection of the Dead: Spiritual Elitism in Corinth.” Novum Testamentum 20 (1978): 203-31.

1979 ——. “Josephus and the Bandits.” Journal for the Study of Judaism 10 (1979): 37-63. ——. “The Sicarii: Ancient Jewish ‘Terrorists’.” The Journal of Religion 59 (1979): 435-58. ——. “Reflections on Witchcraft and European Folk Religion.” History of Religions 19 (1979): 71-95. ——. “Spiritual Marriage with Sophia.” Vigiliae Christianae 33 (1979): 30-54. ——. “Who Were the Witches? The Social Roles of the Accused in the European Witch Trials.” The Journal of Interdisciplinary History 9 (1979): 689-715.

1981 ——. “Ancient Jewish Banditry and the Revolt against Rome, A.D. 66-70.” Catholic Biblical Quarterly 43 (1981): 409-32.

1984 ——. “Popular Messianic Movements around the Time of Jesus.” Catholic Biblical Quarterly 46 (1984): 471-95.

1985 ——. “‘Like One of the Prophets of Old’: Two Types of Popular Prophets at the Time of Jesus.” Catholic Biblical Quarterly 47 (1985): 435-63. ——. “Menahem in Jerusalem: A Brief Messianic Episode among the Sicarii – Not ‘Zealot Messianism’.” Novum Testamentum 27 (1985): 334-48.

1986 ——. “The Zealots. Their Origin, Relationships, and Importance in the Jewish Revolt.” Novum Testamentum 28 (1986): 159-92. ——. “High Priests and the Politics of Roman Palestine. A Contextual Analysis of the Evidence in Josephus.” Journal for the Study of Judaism 17 (1986): 23-55. ——. “Popular Prophetic Movements at the Time of Jesus. Their Principal Features and Social Origins.” Journal for the Study of the New Testament 26 (1986): 3-27. ——. “Ethics and Exegesis: ‘Love Your Enemies’ and the Doctrine of Nonviolence.” Journal of the American Academy of Religion 54 (1986): 3-31. Repr., pages 72-101 in The Love of Enemy and Nonretaliation in the New Testament. Edited by Willard M. Swartley. Louisville, KY: Westminster John Knox, 1992.

1987 ——. “'Apiru and Cossacks: A Comparative Analysis of Social Form and Historical Role.” Pages 3-26 in Religion, Literature, and Society in Ancient Israel, Formative Christianity and Judaism. Ancient Israel and Christianity. Edited by Jacob Neusner, Peder Borgen, Ernest S. Frerichs, and Richard A. Horsley. Vol. 2 of New Perspectives on Ancient Judaism. Lanham, MD: University Press of America, 1987. ——. Jesus and the Spiral of Violence: Popular Jewish Resistance in Roman Palestine. San Francisco: Harper and Row, 1987. Repr., Minneapolis: Fortress, 1993.

1988 ——. “Bandits, Messiahs, and Longshoremen: Popular Unrest in Galilee around the Time of Jesus.” Pages 183-99 in Society of Biblical Literature 1988 Seminar Papers. Edited by David J. Lull. SBLSPS 27. Atlanta: Scholars Press, 1988. ——. “Liberating Christmas.” Christianity and Crisis 48.18 (December 12, 1988): 436-8.

1989 ——. “Questions about Redactional Strata and the Social Relations Reflected in Q.” Pages 186-203 in Society of Biblical Literature 1989 Seminar Papers. Edited by David J. Lull. SBLSPS 28. Atlanta: Scholars Press, 1989. ——. The Liberation of Christmas: The Infancy Narratives in Social Context. New York: Crossroad, 1989. ——. Sociology and the Jesus Movement. New York: Crossroad, 1989, Repr., 2d. ed. New York: Continuum, 1994.

1991 ——. “Q and Jesus: Assumptions, Approaches, and Analyses.” Semeia 55 (1991): 175-209. ——. “Logoi Prophētōn? Reflections on the Genre of Q.” Pages 195-209 in The Future of Early Christianity. Edited by Birger A. Pearson, A. Thomas Kraabel, George W. E. Nickelsburg, and Norman R. Petersen. Minneapolis: Fortress, 1991. Repr., Richard A. Horsley and Patrick Tiller, pages 191-206 in After Apocalyptic and Wisdom: Rethinking Texts in Context. Eugene, OR: Cascade, 2012. ——. “The Q People: Renovation, not Radicalism.” Continuum 1.3 (1991): 49-63. ——. “Empire, Temple and Community–But No Bourgeoisie! A Response to Blenkinsopp and Petersen.” Pages 163-74 in Second Temple Studies 1. Persian Period. Edited by Philip R. Davies. Journal for the Study of the Old Testament Supplement Series 117. Sheffield: JSOT Press, 1991.

1992 ——. “Tradition and Innovation in Gospel Studies.” Religious Studies Review 18 (1992): 290-5. ——. “‘Messianic’ Figures and Movements in First-Century Palestine.” Pages 276-95 in The Messiah: Developments in Earliest Judaism and Christianity. Edited by James H. Charlesworth. Minneapolis: Fortress, 1992. ——. “Response to Walter Wink, ‘Neither Passivity nor Violence: Jesus’ Third Way’.” Pages 126-36 in The Love of Enemy and Nonretaliation in the New Testament. Edited by Willard M. Swartley. Louisville, KY: Westminster John Knox, 1992.

1993 ——. “Liberating Narrative and Liberating Understanding: The Christmas Story.” Pages 154-71 in The Bible and Liberation: Political and Social Hermeneutics. rev. ed. Edited by Norman K. Gottwald and Richard A. Horsley. Maryknoll, NY: Orbis, 1993. [reprinted from Richard A. Horsley. Pages 144-61 in The Liberation of Christmas: The Infancy Narratives in Social Context. New York: Crossroad, 1989]. ——. “The Imperial Situation of Palestinian Jewish Society.” Pages 395-407 in The Bible and Liberation: Political and Social Hermeneutics, rev. ed. Edited by Norman K. Gottwald and Richard A. Horsley. Maryknoll, NY: Orbis, 1993. [reprinted from Richard A. Horsley. Pages 3–19 in Jesus and the Spiral of Violence: Popular Jewish Resistance in Roman Palestine. San Francisco: Harper and Row, 1987]. ——. “The Kingdom of God and the Renewal of Israel.” Pages 408-27 in The Bible and Liberation: Political and Social Hermeneutics, rev. ed. Edited by Norman K. Gottwald and Richard A. Horsley. Maryknoll, NY: Orbis, 1993. [reprinted from Richard A. Horsley. Pages 167-208 in Jesus and the Spiral of Violence: Popular Jewish Resistance in Roman Palestine. San Francisco: Harper and Row, 1987]. ——. “Palestinian Jewish Groups and their Messiahs in Late Second Temple Times.” Pages 14–29 in Messianism Through History. Edited by Wim Beuken, Seán Freyne, and Anton Weiler. London: SCM; Maryknoll, NY: Orbis, 1993. ——. “Wisdom and Apocalypticism in Mark.” Pages 223-44 in In Search of Wisdom: Essays in Memory of John G. Gammie. Edited by Leo G. Perdue, Bernard Brandon Scott, and William Johnston Wiseman. Louisville, KY: Westminster John Knox, 1993. Repr., Richard A. Horsley and Patrick Tiller. “Apocalypticism and Wisdom: Missing in Mark.” Pages 207-29 in After Apocalyptic and Wisdom: Rethinking Texts in Context. Eugene, OR: Cascade, 2012.

1994 ——. “Innovation in Search of Reorientation: New Testament Studies Rediscovering its Subject Matter.” Journal of the American Academy of Religion 62 (1994): 1127-66. ——. “The Historical Jesus and Archaeology of the Galilee: Questions From Historical Jesus Research to Archaeologists.” Pages 91–135 in Society of Biblical Literature 1994 Seminar Papers. Edited by Eugene Harrison Lovering Jr. SBLSPS 33. Atlanta: Scholars Press. 1994. ——. “The Death of Jesus.” Pages 395-422 in Studying the Historical Jesus: Evaluations of the State of Current Research. Edited by Bruce Chilton and Craig A. Evans. New Testament Tools and Studies 19. Leiden: Brill, 1994. ——. “Wisdom Justified by All Her Children: Examining Allegedly Disparate Traditions in Q.” Pages 733-51 in Society of Biblical Literature 1994 Seminar Papers. Edited by Eugene Harrison Lovering Jr. SBLSPS 33. Atlanta: Scholars Press. 1994. Repr., Richard A. Horsley and Patrick Tiller.” Questions about Wisdom and Apocalypticism in Q.” Pages 163-90 in After Apocalyptic and Wisdom: Rethinking Texts in Context. Eugene, OR: Cascade, 2012. ——. “Jesus, Itinerant Cynic or Israelite Prophet?” Pages 68–97 in Images of Jesus Today. Faith and Scholarship Colloquies 3. Florida Southern College. Edited by James H. Charlesworth and Walter P. Weaver. Valley Forge, PA: Trinity Press International, 1994.

1995 ——. “Social Conflict in the Synoptic Sayings Source Q.” Pages 37–52 in Conflict and Invention: Literary, Rhetorical, and Social Studies on the Sayings Gospel Q. Edited by John S. Kloppenborg. Valley Forge, PA: Trinity Press International, 1995. ——. “Archaeology of Galilee and the Historical Context of Jesus.” Neotestamentica 29 (1995): 211-29. ——. “Archaeology and the Villages of Upper Galilee: A Dialogue with Archaeologists.” Bulletin of the American Schools of Oriental Research no. 297 (February, 1995): 5-16. ——. Galilee: History, Politics, People. Valley Forge, PA: Trinity Press International, 1995. ——. “Response: Richard A. Horsley.” Bulletin of the American Schools of Oriental Research no. 297 (February, 1995): 27-28.

1996 ——. Archaeology, History, and Society in Galilee: The Social Context of Jesus and the Rabbis. Valley Forge, PA: Trinity Press International, 1996. ——. “What has Galilee to do with Jerusalem? Political Aspects of the Jesus Movement.” Hervormde Teologiese Studies 52 (1996): 88-104.

1997 ——. “1 Corinthians: A Case Study of Paul’s Assembly as an Alternative Society.” Pages 242-52 in Paul and Empire: Religion and Power in Roman Imperial Society. Edited by Richard A. Horsley. Harrisburg, PA: Trinity Press International, 1997.

1998 ——. “The Kingdom of God and the Renewal of Israel: Synoptic Gospels, Jesus Movements, and Apocalypticism.” Pages 303-44 in The Origins of Apocalypticism in Judaism and Christianity. Edited by John J. Collins. Vol. 1 of The Encyclopedia of Apocalypticism. Edited by Bernard McGinn, John J. Collins, and Stephen J. Stein. New York: Continuum, 1998. Repr., Richard A. Horsley and Patrick Tiller. Pages 230-79 in After Apocalyptic and Wisdom: Rethinking Texts in Context. Eugene, OR: Cascade, 2012. ——. “Submerged Biblical Histories and Imperial Biblical Studies.” Pages 152-73 in The Postcolonial Bible. Edited by R. S. Sugirtharajah. The Bible and Postcolonialism 1. Sheffield: Sheffield Academic, 1998. ——. “Conquest and Social Conflict in Galilee.” Pages 129-68 in Recruitment, Conquest, and Conflict: Strategies in Judaism, Early Christianity, and the Greco-Roman World. Edited by Peder Borgen, Vernon K. Robbins, and David B. Gowler. Emery Studies in Early Christianity 6. Atlanta: Scholars Press, 1998. ——. 1 Corinthians. Abingdon New Testament Commentaries. Nashville: Abingdon, 1998. ——. “The Slave Systems of Classical Antiquity and Their Reluctant Recognition by Modern Scholars.” Semeia 83-84 (1998): 19-66. ——. “Paul and Slavery: A Critical Alternative to Recent Readings.” Semeia 83-84 (1998): 153-200.

1999 ——. “Jesus and Galilee: The Contingencies of a Renewal Movement.” Pages 57–74 in Galilee Through the Centuries: Confluence of Cultures. Edited by Eric M. Meyers. Duke Judaic Studies Series 1. Winona Lake, IN: Eisenbrauns, 1999. ——. “Synagogues in Galilee and the Gospels.” Pages 46–69 in Evolution of the Synagogue: Problems and Prospects. Edited by Howard Clark Kee and Lynn H. Cohick. Harrisburg, PA: Trinity Press International, 1999. ——. “Introduction.” Pages 1–13,

  	“The Teachings of Jesus and Liberal Individualism.” Pages 15–28,
  	“The Historical Context of Q.” Pages 46–60,
  	“The Contours of Q.” Pages 61–93,
  	“Israelite Traditions in Q.” Pages 94–122,
  	“The Oral Communication Environment of Q.” Pages 123-49,
 	“Recent Studies of Oral-Derived Literature and Q. ” Pages 150-74,
 	“The Covenant Renewal Discourse: Q 6:20–49.” Pages 195-227,

“Prophetic Enmvoys for the Renewal of Israel: Q 9:57–10:16.” Pages 228-49, “The Kingdom of God as the Renewal of Israel.” Pages 260-76, “The Renewal of Israel over against Its Rulers.” Pages 277-91, “The Renewal Movement and the Prophet Performers of Q.” Pages 292-310 in Whoever Hears You Hears Me: Prophets, Performance, and Tradition in Q. Edited by Richard A. Horsley and Jonathan A. Draper. Harrisburg, PA: Trinity Press International, 1999. ——. “The Oral Communication Environment of Q.” Pages 123-149

2000 ——. “Social Relations and Social Conflict in the Epistle of Enoch.” Pages 100-15 in For a Later Generation: The Transformation of Tradition in Israel, Early Judaism, and Early Christianity. Edited by Randall A. Argall, Beverly A. Bow, and Rodney A. Werline. Harrisburg, PA: Trinity Press International, 2000. ——. “Introduction: Krister Stendahl’s Challenge to Pauline Studies.” Pages 1–16 in Paul and Politics: Ekklesia, Israel, Imperium, Interpretation. Edited by Richard A. Horsley, Harrisburg, PA: Trinity Press International, 2000. ——. “Rhetoric and Empire–And 1 Corinthians.” Pages 72–102 in Paul and Politics: Ekklesia, Israel, Imperium, Interpretation. Edited by Richard A. Horsley, Harrisburg, PA: Trinity Press International, 2000.

2001 ——. Hearing the Whole Story: The Politics of Plot in Mark’s Gospel. Louisville, KY: Westminster John Knox, 2001. ——. “Christmas: The Religion of Consumer Capitalism.” Pages 165-87 in Christmas Unwrapped: Consumerism, Christ, and Culture. Edited by Richard A. Horsley and James Tracy. Harrisburg, PA: Trinity Press International, 2001. ——. “Moral Economy, Little Tradition, and Hidden Transcript: Applying the Work of James C. Scott to Q.” Pages 240-59 in Society of Biblical Literature 2001 Seminar Papers. SBLSPS 40. Atlanta: Scholars Press, 2001.

2002 ——. “The Expansion of Hasmonean Rule in Idumea and Galilee: Toward a Historical Sociology.” Pages 134-65 in Second Temple Studies III: Studies in Politics, Class and Material Culture. Edited by Philip R. Davies and John M. Halligan. Journal for the Study of the Old Testament Supplement Series 340. London: Sheffield Academic; 2002. ——. “Power Vacuum and Power Struggle in 66-7 C.E.” Pages 87–109 in The First Jewish Revolt: Archaeology, History, and Ideology. Edited by Andrea M. Berlin and J. Andrew Overman. London: Routledge, 2002.

2003 ——. “Subverting Disciplines: The Possibilities and Limitations of Postcolonial Theory for New Testament Studies.” Pages 90–105 in Toward a New Heaven and a New Earth: Essays in Honor of Elisabeth Schüssler Fiorenza. Edited by Fernando F. Segovia. Maryknoll, NY: Orbis, 2003. ——. Religion and Empire: People, Power, and the Life of the Spirit. Minneapolis: Fortress, 2003. ——. “Oral Tradition in New Testament Studies.” Oral Tradition 18.1 (2003): 34-6. ——. Jesus and Empire: The Kingdom of God and the New World Disorder. Minneapolis: Fortress, 2003. ——. “A Response to Robert Gundry’s Review of Hearing the Whole Story.” Journal for the Study of the New Testament 26 (2003): 151-69. ——. “Feminist Scholarship and Postcolonial Criticism: Subverting Imperial Discourse and Reclaiming Submerged Histories.” Pages 297-317 in Walk in the Ways of Wisdom: Essays in Honor of Elisabeth Schüssler Fiorenza. Edited by Shelly Matthews, Cynthia Briggs Kittredge, and Melanie Johnson-Debaufre. Harrisburg, PA: Trinity Press International, 2003. ——. “Religion and Other Products of Empire.” Journal of the American Academy of Religion 71 (2003): 13-44. ——. “Rejoinder: Thoughts from the Belly of the Beast.” Journal of the American Academy of Religion 71 (2003): 129-33. ——. “Who is Your Savior?” The Other Side 39.6 (2003): 22-5.

2004 ——. “The Origins of the Hebrew Scriptures in Imperial Relations.” Pages 107-134 in Orality, Literacy, and Colonialism in Antiquity. Edited by Jonathan A. Draper. Society of Biblical Literature Semeia Studies 47. Leiden: Brill; Atlanta: SBL, 2004. Rev., Richard A. Horsley. “The Origins of the Hebrew Scriptures under Imperial Rule. Pages 31-52 in Text and Tradition in Performance and Writing. Eugene, OR: Cascade, 2013. ——. “Introduction–Jesus, Paul, and the ‘Arts of Resistance’: Leaves from the Notebook of James C. Scott.” Pages 1-26 in Hidden Transcripts and the Arts of Resistance: Applying the Work of James C. Scott to Jesus and Paul. Edited by Richard A. Horsley. Society of Biblical Literature Semeia Studies 48. Atlanta: SBL, 2004. ——. “The Politics of Disguise and Public Declaration of the Hidden Transcript: Broadening Our Approach to the Historical Jesus with Scott’s ‘Arts of Resistance’ Theory.” Pages 61-80 in Hidden Transcripts and the Arts of Resistance: Applying the Work of James C. Scott to Jesus and Paul. Edited by Richard A. Horsley. Society of Biblical Literature Semeia Studies 48. Atlanta: SBL, 2004. ——. “The Pharisees and Jesus in Galilee and Q.” Pages 117-45 in Vol. 1 of When Judaism and Christianity Began: Essays in Memory of Anthony J. Saldarini. Edited by Alan J. Avery-Peck, Daniel J. Harrington, and Jacob Neusner. Supplements to the Journal for the Study of Judaism 85. Leiden: Brill, 2004. ——. “Introduction.” Pages 1–23 in Paul and the Roman Imperial Order. Edited by Richard A. Horsley. Harrisburg, PA: Trinity Press International, 2004.

2005 ——. “Prominent Patterns in the Social Memory of Jesus and Friends.” Pages 57–78 in Memory, Tradition, and Text: Uses of the Past in Early Christianity. Edited by Alan Kirk and Tom Thatcher. Society of Biblical Literature Semeia Studies 52. Atlanta: SBL, 2005. ——. “Of Enoch, Nickelsburg, and Other Scribes of Righteousness.” Review of Rabbinic Judaism 8 (2005): 249-66. ——. “Jesus Movements and the Renewal of Israel.” Pages 23–46 in Christian Origins. A People’s History of Christianity, vol. 1. Edited by Richard A. Horsley. Minneapolis: Fortress, 2005. Repr., Pages 11–39 in A People’s History of Christianity–Student Edition: From the Early Church to the Reformation, Vol. 1. Edited by Denis R. Janz. Minneapolis: Fortress, 2014. ——. “The Politics of Cultural Production in Second Temple Judea: Historical Context and Political-Religious Relations of the Scribes Who Produced 1 Enoch, Sirach, and Daniel.” Pages 123-45 in Conflicted Boundaries in Wisdom and Apocalypticism. Edited by Benjamin Givens Wright III and Lawrence Mitchell Wills. Society of Biblical Literature Symposium Series 35. Atlanta: SBL, 2005. Repr., “The Politics of Cultural Production in Second Temple Judea: The Historical Context of Sirach, 1 Enoch and Daniel.” Pages 56–80 in Richard A. Horsley and Patrick Tiller. After Apocalyptic and Wisdom: Rethinking Texts in Context. Eugene, OR: Cascade, 2012. ——. “Jesus and Empire.” Union Seminary Quarterly Review 59 (2005): 44-74. ——. “Paul’s Assembly in Corinth: An Alternative Society.” Pages 371-95 in Urban Religion in Roman Corinth: Interdisciplinary Approaches. Edited by Daniel N. Schowalter and Steven J. Friesen. Harvard Theological Studies 53. Cambridge, MA: Harvard University Press, 2005. ——. “Abandoning the Unhistorical Quest for an Apolitical Jesus.” Pages 288-301 in The Historical Jesus in Recent Research. Edited by James D. G. Dunn and Scot McKnight. Winona Lake, IN: Eisenbrauns, 2005.

2006 ——. “Introduction.” Pages vii-xvi in Performing the Gospel: Orality, Memory, and Mark: Essays Dedicated to Werner Kelber. Edited by Richard A. Horsley, Jonathan A. Draper, and John Miles Foley. Minneapolis: Fortress, 2006. ——. “A Prophet Like Moses and Elijah: Popular Memory and Cultural Patterns in Mark.” Pages 166-90 in Performing the Gospel: Orality, Memory, and Mark: Essays Dedicated to Werner Kelber. Edited by Richard A. Horsley, Jonathan A. Draper, and John Miles Foley. Minneapolis: Fortress, 2006. ——. “Renewal Movements and Resistance to Empire in Ancient Judea.” Pages 69–77 in The Postcolonial Reader. Edited by R. S. Sugirtharajah. Oxford: Blackwell, 2006. [reprinted from Richard A. Horsley. Pages 74–92 in Religion and Empire: People, Power, and the Life of the Spirit. Minneapolis: Fortress, 2003]. ——. “Early Christian Movements: Jesus Movements and the Renewal of Israel.” Hervormde Teologiese Studies 62.4 (2006): 1201-25. ——. “Performance and Tradition: The Covenant Speech in Q.” Pages 43–70 in Oral Performance, Popular Tradition, and Hidden Transcript in Q. Edited by Richard A. Horsley. Society of Biblical Literature Semeia Studies 60. Atlanta: SBL, 2006. ——. “Moral Economy and Renewal Movement in Q.” Pages 143-57 in Oral Performance, Popular Tradition, and Hidden Transcript in Q. Edited by Richard A. Horsley. Society of Biblical Literature Semeia Studies 60. Atlanta: SBL, 2006.

2007 ——. “The Political Roots of Early Judean Apocalyptic Texts.” Pages 262-78 in To Break Every Yoke: Essays in Honor of Marvin L. Chaney. Edited by Robert B. Coote and Norman K. Gottwald. Sheffield: Phoenix, 2007. ——. Scribes, Visionaries, and the Politics of Second Temple Judea. Louisville, KY: Westminster John Knox, 2007.

2008 ——. “‘My Name is Legion’: Spirit Possession and Exorcism in Roman Palestine.” Pages 41-57 in Inquiry into Religious Experience in Early Judaism and Christianity, Experientia Vol. 1. Edited by Frances Flannery, Colleen Shantz, and Rodney A. Werline. Society of Biblical Literature Symposium Series 40. Atlanta: SBL, 2008. ——. “Introduction: The Bible and Empires.” Pages 1–7 in In the Shadow of Empire: Reclaiming the Bible as a History of Faithful Resistance. Edited by Richard A. Horsley. Louisville, KY: Westminster John Knox, 2008. ——. “Jesus and Empire.” Pages 75–96 in In the Shadow of Empire: Reclaiming the Bible as a History of Faithful Resistance. Edited by Richard A. Horsley. Louisville, KY: Westminster John Knox, 2008. ——. Wisdom and Spiritual Transcendence at Corinth: Studies in First Corinthians. Eugene, OR: Cascade, 2008. ——. Jesus in Context: Power, People, and Performance. Minneapolis: Fortress, 2008. ——. “Oral Performance and Mark: Some Implications of The Oral and the Written Gospel, Twenty-five Years Later.” Pages 45–70 in Jesus, the Voice, and the Text: Beyond the Oral and the Written Gospel. Edited by Tom Thatcher. Waco, TX: Baylor University Press, 2008. Repr., Richard A. Horsley. “Oral Performance and the Gospel of Mark.” Pages 220-45 in Text and Tradition in Performance and Writing. Eugene, OR: Cascade, 2013.

2009 ——. Covenant Economics: A Biblical Vision of Justice for All. Louisville, KY: Westminster John Knox, 2009. ——. “Jesus and the Renewal of Covenantal Economics.” Pages 181-207 in The Bible and the American Future. Edited by Robert Jewett with Wayne L. Alloway Jr. and John G. Lacey. Eugene, OR: Cascade, 2009. ——. “The Language(s) of the Kingdom: From Aramaic to Greek, Galilee to Syria, Oral to Oral-Written.” Pages 401-25 in A Wandering Galilean: Essays in Honour of Seán Freyne. Edited by Zuleika Rodgers with Margaret Daly-Denton and Anne Fitzpatrick McKinley. Supplements to the Journal for the Study of Judaism 132. Leiden: Brill, 2009. Repr., Richard A. Horsley. “The Language(s) of the Kingdom: From Aramaic to Greek, Galilee to Syria.” Pages 198-219 in Text and Tradition in Performance and Writing. Eugene, OR: Cascade, 2013.

2010 ——. “The Gospel of Mark in the Interface of Orality and Writing.” Pages 144-65 in The Interface of Orality and Writing: Speaking, Seeing, Writing in the Shaping of New Genres. Edited by Annette Weissenrieder and Robert B. Coote. Wissenshaftliche Untersuchungen zum Neuen Testament 260. Tübingen: Mohr Siebeck, 2010. ——. “Jesus and the Politics of Roman Palestine.” Journal for the Study of the Historical Jesus 8 (2010): 99-145. ——. Revolt of the Scribes: Resistance and Apocalyptic Origins. Minneapolis: Fortress, 2010. ——. “Oral and Written Aspects of the Emergence of the Gospel of Mark as Scripture.” Oral Tradition 25.1 (2010): 93-114. Repr., Richard A. Horsley. “Oral Performance in the Emergence of the Gospel of Mark as Scripture.” Pages 279-301 in Text and Tradition in Performance and Writing. Eugene, OR: Cascade, 2013.

2011 ——. “Oral Communication, Oral Performance, and New Testament Interpretation.” Pages 125-55 in Method and Meaning: Essays on New Testament Interpretation in Honor of Harold W. Attridge. Edited by Andrew B. McGowan and Kent Harold Richards. Society of Biblical Literature Resources for Biblical Study 67. Atlanta: SBL, 2011. Repr., Richard A. Horsley. Pages 1–30 in Text and Tradition in Performance and Writing. Eugene, OR: Cascade, 2013. ——. “Jesus-in-Context: A Relational Approach.” Pages 207-40 in Vol. 1 of Handbook for the Study of the Historical Jesus. Edited by Tom Holmén and Stanley E. Porter. Leiden: Brill, 2011. ——. Jesus and the Powers: Conflict, Covenant, and the Hope of the Poor. Minneapolis: Fortress, 2011.

2012 ——. The Prophet Jesus and the Renewal of Israel: Moving Beyond a Diversionary Debate. Grand Rapids: Eerdmans, 2012.

2013 ——. “‘It Is More Complicated’: Reflections on Some Suggestive Essays.” Pages 241-60 in Postcolonialism and the Hebrew Bible: The Next Step. Edited by Roland Boer. Society of Biblical Literature Semeia Studies 70. Atlanta: SBL, 2013. ——. Text and Tradition in Performance and Writing. Biblical Performance Criticism Series 9. Eugene, OR: Cascade, 2013.

2014 ——. “Centralization of Political-Economic Power and the Generation of Poverty: The Mission of Jesus.” Pages 83–105 in The Bible, the Economy, and the Poor. Edited by Ronald A. Simkins and Thomas M. Kelly. Journal of Religion and Society Supplement Series 10 (2014). ——. Jesus and the Politics of Roman Palestine. Columbia: University of South Carolina, 2014. ——. “Social Movements in Galilee.” Pages 167-74 in Vol. 1 of Galilee in the Late Second Temple and Mishnaic Periods. Life, Culture, and Society. Edited by David A. Fiensy and James Riley Strange. Minneapolis: Fortress, 2014. ——. Jesus and Magic: Freeing the Gospel Stories from Modern Misconceptions. Eugene, OR: Cascade, 2014. ——. Review of Zealot: The Life and Times of Jesus of Nazareth, by Reza Aslan, Critical Research on Religion 2.2 (2014): 195-205.

2015 ——. “You Shall Not Bow Down and Serve Them: Economic Justice in the Bible.” Interpretation 69 (2015): 415-31. ——. “Response: A Component Community of an Alternative Society.” Pages 285-93 in The People beside Paul: The Philippian Assembly and History from Below. Edited by Joseph A. Marchal. Early Christianity and Its Literature 17. Atlanta: SBL, 2015. ——. “Why Bother with Biblical Studies?” Pages 313-56 in Reading the Bible in an Age of Crisis: Political Exegesis for a New Day. Edited by Bruce Worthington. Minneapolis: Fortress, 2015.

2016 ——. “Jesus-in-Movement and the Roman Imperial (Dis)order.” Pages 47–69 in An Introduction to Empire in the New Testament. Edited by Adam Winn. Society of Biblical Literature Resources for Biblical Study 84. Atlanta: SBL Press, 2016. ——. Foreword to Money and Possessions, by Walter Brueggemann, xi-xvii. Louisville, KY: Westminster John Knox, 2016.

Co-authored Publications by Richard Horsley Horsley, Richard A. and John S. Hanson. Bandits, Prophets, and Messiahs: Popular Movements at the Time of Jesus. Minneapolis: Winston, 1985. Repr., with a new preface. Harrisburg, PA: Trinity Press International, 1999. Horsley, Ritta and Richard A. Horsley. “On the Trail of the ‘Witches:’ Wise Women, Midwives and the European Witch Hunts.” Pages 1-28 in Vol. 3 of Women in German Yearbook. Feminist Studies in German Literature & Culture. Edited by Marianne Burkhard and Edith Waldstein. Lincoln, NE, 1986. Horsley, Richard A. and Neil Asher Silberman. The Message and the Kingdom: How Jesus and Paul Ignited a Revolution and Transformed the Ancient World. Minneapolis: Fortress, 1997. Callahan, Allen Dwight, Richard A. Horsley, and Abraham Smith. “Introduction: The Slavery of New Testament Studies.” Semeia 83-84 (1998): 1-15. Callahan, Allen Dwight and Richard A. Horsley. “Slave Resistance in Antiquity.” Semeia 83-84 (1998): 133-51. Horsley, Richard A. and Jonathan A. Draper. Whoever Hears You Hears Me: Prophets, Performance, and Tradition in Q. Harrisburg, PA: Trinity Press International, 1999. Horsley, Richard A. and Patrick Tiller. “Ben Sira and the Sociology of the Second Temple.” Pages 74–107 in Second Temple Studies III: Studies in Politics, Class and Material Culture. Edited by Philip R. Davies and John M. Halligan. Journal for the Study of the Old Testament Supplement Series 340. London: Sheffield Academic Press, 2002. Repr., pages 19–55 in Richard A. Horsley and Patrick Tiller. After Apocalyptic and Wisdom: Rethinking Texts in Context. Eugene, OR: Cascade, 2012. Horsley, Richard A. and Patrick Tiller. After Apocalyptic and Wisdom: Rethinking Texts in Context. Eugene, OR: Cascade, 2012. Horsley, Richard A. and Tom Thatcher. John, Jesus and the Renewal of Israel. Grand Rapids: Eerdmans, 2013.

Publications Edited by Richard Horsley ——. ed. Paul and Empire: Religion and Power in Roman Imperial Society. Harrisburg, PA: Trinity Press International, 1997. ——. ed. Paul and Politics: Ekklesia, Israel, Imperium, Interpretation. Harrisburg, PA: Trinity Press International, 2000. ——. ed. Paul and the Roman Imperial Order. Harrisburg, PA: Trinity Press International, 2004. ——. ed. Hidden Transcripts and the Arts of Resistance: Applying the Work of James C. Scott to Jesus and Paul. Society of Biblical Literature Semeia Studies 48. Atlanta: SBL, 2004. ——. ed. Christian Origins. A People’s History of Christianity, vol. 1. Minneapolis: Fortress, 2005. ——. ed. Oral Performance, Popular Tradition, and Hidden Transcript in Q. Society of Biblical Literature Semeia Studies 60. Atlanta: SBL, 2006. ——. ed. In the Shadow of Empire: Reclaiming the Bible as a History of Faithful Resistance. Louisville, KY: Westminster John Knox, 2008.

Publications Co-edited by Richard Horsley Neusner, Jacob, Peder Borgen, Ernest S. Frerichs, and Richard A. Horsley, eds. Religion, Literature, and Society in Ancient Israel, Formative Christianity and Judaism. Ancient Israel and Christianity. Vol. 2 of New Perspectives on Ancient Judaism. Lanham, MD: University Press of America, 1987 Neusner, Jacob, Peder Borgen, Ernest S. Frerichs, and Richard A. Horsley, eds. The Social World of Formative Christianity and Judaism. Philadelphia: Fortress, 1988. Gottwald, Norman K. and Richard A. Horsley, eds. The Bible and Liberation: Political and Social Hermeneutics. rev. ed. Maryknoll, NY: Orbis, 1993. Callahan, Allen Dwight, Richard A. Horsley, and Abraham Smith, eds. Slavery in Text and Interpretation. Semeia 83-84. Atlanta: Scholars Press, 1998. Horsley, Richard A. and James Tracy, eds. Christmas Unwrapped: Consumerism, Christ, and Culture. Harrisburg, PA: Trinity Press International, 2001. Horsley, Richard A., Jonathan A. Draper, and John Miles Foley, eds. Performing the Gospel: Orality, Memory, and Mark: Essays Dedicated to Werner Kelber. Minneapolis: Fortress, 2006.
