= The Bible Unearthed =

2001 book about the archaeology of Israel

- Dust-jacket for The Bible Unearthed
- Author: Israel Finkelstein and Neil Asher Silberman
- Language: English
- Subject: Archaeology, Bible studies
- Publisher: Free Press
- Publication date: 2001
- Publication place: United States
- Media type: Print (Hardback)
- Pages: 385 pp
- ISBN: 978-0-684-86912-4
- OCLC: 44509358
- Dewey Decimal: 221.9/5 21
- LC Class: BS621 .F56 2001
- Website: Simon and Schuster website

The Bible Unearthed: Archaeology's New Vision of Ancient Israel and the Origin of Its Sacred Texts is a 2001 book by Israel Finkelstein, Professor of Archaeology at Tel Aviv University, and Neil Asher Silberman, an archaeologist, historian and contributing editor to Archaeology Magazine. The book discusses the archaeology of ancient Israel and its relationship to the origins and content of the Hebrew Bible.

Finkelstein and Silberman contend that the composition of the Bible began in the Iron Age, centuries after the events of Israel's founding myths—the patriarchs and the Exodus from Egypt. They argue that numerous biblical passages conflict with the Bronze Age and Iron Age archaeological record of the Land of Israel, and that the text reflects an authorship bias toward the Kingdom of Judah at the expense of the Kingdom of Israel. They also reject the historical plausibility of a prosperous united kingdom of Israel and Judah ruled by David and Solomon from Jerusalem in the 10th century BCE, instead positing this narrative as an ideological construct promoted by late Judahite kings such as Hezekiah and Josiah. The book was both praised and criticized by biblical scholars for its reconstruction of ancient Israel's history.

== Methodology ==
The methodology applied by the authors is historical criticism with an emphasis on archaeology. Writing on the website of "The Bible and Interpretation" in March 2001, the authors describe their approach as one "in which the Bible is one of the most important artifacts and cultural achievements [but] not the unquestioned narrative framework into which every archaeological find must be fit." Their main contention is that:

...an archaeological analysis of the patriarchal, conquest, judges, and United Monarchy narratives [shows] that while there is no compelling archaeological evidence for any of them, there is clear archaeological evidence that places the stories themselves in a late 7th-century BCE context.

On the basis of this evidence they propose

... an archaeological reconstruction of the distinct histories of the kingdoms of Israel and Judah, highlighting the largely neglected history of the Omride Dynasty and attempting to show how the influence of Assyrian imperialism in the region set in motion a chain of events that would eventually make the poorer, more remote, and more religiously conservative kingdom of Judah the belated center of the cultic and national hopes of all Israel.

As noted by a reviewer on Salon.com the approach and conclusions of The Bible Unearthed are not particularly new. Ze'ev Herzog, professor of archaeology at Tel Aviv University, wrote a cover story for Haaretz in 1999 in which he reached similar conclusions following the same methodology; Herzog noted also that some of these findings have been accepted by the majority of biblical scholars and archaeologists for years and even decades, even though they have only recently begun to make a dent in the awareness of the general public.

== Content ==
Early biblical archaeology was conducted with the presumption that the Bible must be true, finds only being considered as illustrations for the biblical narrative, and interpreting evidence to fit the Bible. Some archaeologists such as Eilat Mazar continue to take this "Bible and spade" approach, or, like the journal Bible and Spade, attempt to treat archaeology as a tool for proving the Bible's accuracy, but since the 1970s most archaeologists, such as Kenneth Kitchen, have begun instead to interpret the evidence only in the light of other archaeology, treating the Bible as an artifact to be examined, rather than as an unquestioned truth. This approach has led to results both in favor and against the historicity of the Old Testament.

=== Ancestors and anachronisms ===
Egypt in the 15th century BCE, the time of the Exodus and the conquest of Canaan as described in the Book of Joshua according to the Biblical chronology. As the map indicates, Canaan was occupied by Egypt at that time, a fact that the Bible fails to register.

The Bible Unearthed begins by considering what it terms the 'preamble' of the Bible—the Book of Genesis—and its relationship to archaeological evidence for the context in which its narratives are set. Archaeological discoveries about society and culture in the ancient Near East lead the authors to point out a number of anachronisms, suggestive that the narratives were actually set down in the 9th–7th centuries BCE:

- Aramaeans are frequently mentioned, but no ancient text mentions them until around 1100 BCE, and they only begin to dominate Israel's northern borders after the 9th century BCE.
- The text describes the early origin of the neighbouring kingdom of Edom, but Assyrian records show that Edom only came into existence after the conquest of the region by Assyria in the late 8th century BCE; before then it was without functioning kings, was not a distinct state, and archaeological evidence shows that the territory was only sparsely populated.
- The Joseph story refers to camel-based traders carrying gum, balm, and myrrh, which is unlikely prior to the first millennium, such activity only became common in the 8th–7th centuries BCE, when Assyrian hegemony enabled this Arabian trade to flourish into a major industry. Recent excavations in the Timna Valley discovered what may be the earliest bones of domesticated camels found in Israel or even outside the Arabian peninsula, dating to around 930 BCE. This is seen as evidence that the stories of Abraham, Joseph, Jacob and Esau were written after this time.
- The land of Goshen has a name that comes from an Arabic group who dominated the Nile Delta only in the 6th and 5th centuries, given as the place and period of the Exodus in Genesis 45:9–10, placing the Exodus incongruently nearly a millennium after its biblical timeline.
- The Egyptian Pharaoh is portrayed as fearing invasion from the east, even though Egypt's territory stretched to the northern parts of Canaan, with its main threat consequently being from the north, until the 7th century

The book comments that this corresponds with the documentary hypothesis, in which textual scholarship argues for the majority of the first five biblical books being written between the 8th and 6th centuries. Although archaeological results, and Assyrian records, suggest that the Kingdom of Israel was the greater of the two, it is the Kingdom of Judah which is afforded greater prominence by Genesis, whose narratives concentrate on Abraham, Jerusalem, Judah (the patriarch), and Hebron, more than on characters and places from the northern kingdom (Israel); the Bible Unearthed explains this pre-eminence of Yahwist text as an attempt to seize the opportunity, afforded by the destruction of Israel in 720 BCE, to portray the Israelites as a single people, with Judah having (always) had primacy.

=== Origin of the Israelites ===
The book remarks that, despite modern archaeological investigations and the meticulous ancient Egyptian records from the period of Ramesses II, also known as Ozymandias (13th century B.C.), there is an obvious lack of any archaeological evidence for the migration of a band of Semitic people across the Sinai Peninsula, except for the Hyksos. Although the Hyksos are in some ways a good match, their main centre being at Avaris (later renamed 'Pi-Ramesses'), in the heart of the region corresponding to the 'land of Goshen', and Manetho later wrote that the Hyksos eventually founded the Temple in Jerusalem, it throws up other problems, as the Hyksos became not slaves but rulers, and they were chased away rather than chased to bring them back. Nevertheless, the book posits that the exodus narrative perhaps evolved from vague memories of the Hyksos expulsion, spun to encourage resistance to the 7th century domination of Judah by Egypt.

Finkelstein and Silberman argue that instead of the Israelites conquering Canaan after the Exodus (as suggested by the book of Joshua), most of them had in fact always been there; the Israelites were simply Canaanites who developed into a distinct culture. Recent surveys of long-term settlement patterns in the Israelite heartlands show no sign of violent invasion or even peaceful infiltration, but rather a sudden demographic transformation about 1200 BCE in which villages appear in the previously unpopulated highlands; these settlements have a similar appearance to modern Bedouin camps, suggesting that the inhabitants were once pastoral nomads, driven to take up farming by the Late Bronze Age collapse of the Canaanite city-culture.

The authors take issue with the book of Joshua's depiction of the Israelites conquering Canaan in only a few years—far less than the lifetime of one individual—in which cities such as Hazor, Ai, and Jericho, are destroyed. Finkelstein and Silberman view this account as the result of the telescoping effect of the vagaries of folk memory about the destruction caused by other events; modern archaeological examination of these cities shows that their destruction spanned a period of many centuries, with Hazor being destroyed 100 to 300 years after Jericho, while Ai (whose name actually means 'the ruin') was completely abandoned for roughly a millennium "before the collapse of Late Bronze Canaan. ... Like Jericho, there was no settlement at the time of its supposed conquest by the children of Israel."

=== David and Solomon or the Omrides? ===
Although the Book of Samuel and initial parts of the Books of Kings, portray Saul, David and Solomon ruling in succession over a powerful and cosmopolitan united kingdom of Israel and Judah, Finkelstein and Silberman regard modern archaeological evidence as showing that this may not be true. Archaeology instead shows that in the time of Solomon, the northern kingdom of Israel was quite small, too poor to be able to pay for a vast army, and with too little bureaucracy to be able to administer a kingdom, certainly not an empire; it only emerged later, around the beginning of the 9th century BCE, in the time of Omri. There is little to suggest that Jerusalem, called by the Bible David's capital, was "more than a typical hill country village" during the time of David and of Solomon, and Judah remained little more than a sparsely populated rural region until the 8th century BCE. Although the Tel Dan Stele seems to confirm that a "House of David" existed, and "clearly validates the biblical description of a figure named David becoming the founder of the dynasty of Judahite kings in Jerusalem", it says nothing else about him.

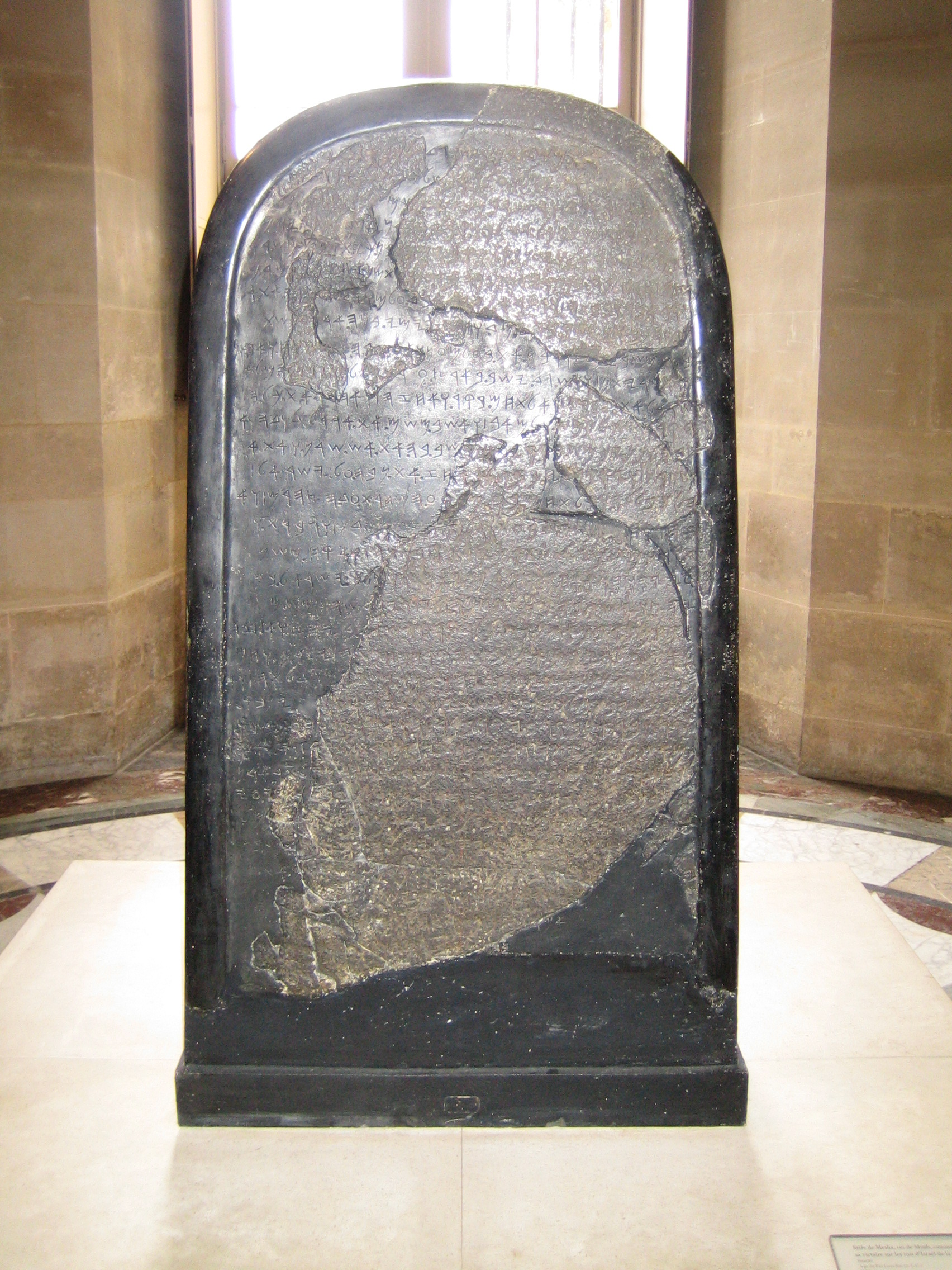
Mesha Stele

There are remains of once grand cities at Megiddo, Hazor and Gezer, with archeological evidence showing that they suffered violent destruction. This destruction once was attributed to the 10th century BCE campaigns by Shishak, these cities therefore being ascribed to David and Solomon as proof of the Bible's account of them, but the destruction layers have since been redated to the late 9th century BCE campaign of Hazael, and the cities to the time of the Omride kings.

The Tel Dan Stele, the Mesha Stele, the Black Obelisk of Shalmaneser, and direct evidence from excavations, together paint a picture of the Omride kings ruling a rich, powerful, and cosmopolitan empire, stretching from Damascus to Moab, and building some of the largest and most beautiful constructions of Iron Age Israel; by contrast, the Bible only remarks that the Omrides 'married foreign women' (presumably to make alliances) and upheld Canaanite religion, both of which it regards as wicked. The Bible Unearthed concludes that the biblical writers deliberately invented the empire, power, and wealth, of Saul, David, and Solomon, by appropriating the deeds and achievements of the Omrides, so that they could then denigrate the Omrides and obscure their accomplishments, since these kings held a religious viewpoint that was anathema to the biblical editors.

=== Hezekiah and monolatry ===
The Book of Kings, as it stands today, seems to suggest that the religion of Israel and Judah was primarily monotheistic, with one or two wayward kings (such as the Omrides) who tried to introduce Canaanite polytheism, the people occasionally joining in this 'apostasy' from monotheism, but a close reading and the archaeological record reveals that the opposite was true. Iron Age remains show that in the time of the setting of the Book of Kings, sacrifices continued to be offered at hilltop shrines (which the Bible terms "high places"), incense and libations were being offered throughout the land, and clay figurines of deities were still being used in homes everywhere in the land as household gods. Inscriptions from "the early eighth century site of Kuntillet Ajrud in northeastern Sinai" as well as "in a late-monarchic inscription from the Shephelah of Judah", even seem to refer to "the goddess Asherah as being the consort of YHWH".

The world changed for Judah when the kingdom of Israel fell to the Assyrians in 720 BCE. Judah was flooded with refugees; the population of Israel had been nine times larger than that of Judah, so many small Judean villages suddenly became cities, archaeology evidencing that the population of Jerusalem itself expanded by about 15-fold, turning it from a small hilltown into a large city. The social and religious struggles, which obviously would occur with such a large influx of population, are not mentioned by the Bible. Finkelstein and Silberman argue that the priests of Jerusalem began to promote Yahweh-based monolatry, aligning themselves with king Hezekiah's anti-Assyrian views, perhaps because they believed that Assyrian domination of Israel had caused social injustice, or perhaps because they just wanted to gain economic and/or political control over the newly wealthy countryside; Hezekiah advanced their agenda, banning the worship of deities other than Yahweh, destroying the hilltop shrines, actions which The Bible Unearthed views as preparation for rebelling against Assyria.

By 701 BCE, the Assyrians had captured most of Judah, and then they besieged Jerusalem; the Bible's coverage of the events leading up to the siege is sparse, briefly listing only a few refortifications of Jerusalem, giving a passing mention to the Siloam tunnel, and briefly admitting to the loss of most of Judah's cities, but archaeology gives much more detail. For example, the fortifications of Lachish were heavily strengthened by Hezekiah, but it was besieged, fell, and was then burnt to the ground; according to an illustration on the walls of the Assyrian palace at Ninevah, the Assyrians deported the city's population and religious objects before they burnt it.

The Bible claims that nearly 200,000 men in the army besieging Jerusalem were slaughtered one night by an angel, causing the Assyrian king Sennacherib to relent and return to Assyria; it immediately goes on to state that Sennacherib was killed by his sons, while he was praying to his god, implying that this was shortly after the battle. However, as The Bible Unearthed points out, this contrasts with the Assyrian record on the Taylor Prism, in which Hezekiah's mercenaries abandoned him, and he only then convinced the Assyrian army to leave by handing over not only vast amounts of money, jewels, and high quality ivory-inlaid furniture, but also his own daughters, harem, and musicians, and making Judah into a tributary state of the Assyrians. Additionally, although Sennacherib was clearly murdered (by person(s) uncertain), it was in 681 BCE; he had lived for over 19 years beyond the end of the siege, conducting several military campaigns elsewhere, and rebuilding and refurnishing his palace entirely.

Hezekiah predeceased Sennacherib, dying just a couple of years after the siege. His successor (and son), Manasseh, reversed the religious changes, re-introducing religious pluralism; Finkelstein and Silberman suggest that this may have been an attempt to gain co-operation from village elders and clans, so that he would not need so much centralised administration, and could therefore allow the countryside to return to economic autonomy. According to the archaeology there must have been a deliberate expansion of agriculture into the Judean desert, and the rich finds from this period suggest that much profit was gained from Judah's now peaceful position in the middle of many of the caravan routes between Assyria's allies; the state certainly increased its administration of trade to levels that far exceed those before.

Hezekiah's actions had given away the gold and silver from the Jerusalem Temple, impoverished his state, lost him his own daughters and concubines, and reduced his territory to a small region around Jerusalem, most of the people elsewhere in Judah being deported; Manasseh had brought peace and prosperity back to the country, but because the Book of Kings bases its narrative on theological prejudice, it condemns him as the most sinful monarch ever to rule Judah and hails instead Hezekiah as the great king. The Bible Unearthed suggests that the priesthood and populace outside Jerusalem may well have held the opposite opinion—that Hezekiah's imposition of monolatry was blasphemous, and the disasters that befell the country during his reign had been punishment from the gods.

=== Josiah and the birth of the Bible ===
As recorded in the Book of Kings, Manasseh's grandson, Josiah, enacted a large religious reform soon after he became king; he ordered renovations to the Jerusalem Temple, during which the High Priest 'found' a scroll of the law, which insisted on monotheism with sacrifice centralised at a single temple—that in Jerusalem. Finkelstein and Silberman note that most scholars regard the core of Deuteronomy as being the "scroll of the law" in question, and regard it as having been written not long before it was 'found', rather than being an ancient missing scroll as characterised in the Bible; Deuteronomy is strikingly similar to early 7th century Assyrian vassal-treaties, in which are set out the rights and obligations of a vassal state (in this case Judah) to their sovereign (in this case, Yahweh). Josiah imposed this scroll as the new religious orthodoxy, and, like Hezekiah before him, destroyed the old cult centres; Josiah even went so far as to slaughter the priests of these shrines, burn their bodies, and bury their bones in the tombs near them, upon the old altars.

The sudden collapse of the Assyrian Empire in the last decades of the 7th century BCE offered an opportunity for Josiah to expand Judah's territory into the former kingdom of Israel, abandoned by the Assyrians. It was now that the author of Deuteronomy, working in Josiah's court, reworked older legends, texts, and histories into a single national history; with the message that it had been the non-Deuteronomic practices of the Israelites that had led to their downfalls, and implied that Joshua, as well as David in some respects, was a foreshadowing of what Josiah could achieve.

Archaeology suggests that Josiah was initially successful, extending his territory northwards towards Bethel, a cult-centre of the kingdom of Israel; however he then rode out to meet the Egyptian Pharaoh—Necho—at Meggido. Necho had been merely 'passing through', leading an army to join the Assyrian civil war on the side of the Assyrian (rather than Babylonian) faction, but Josiah was killed; the circumstances of his death are uncertain, though the Book of Chronicles claims that despite Necho's lack of enmity for Josiah, Josiah insisted on attacking him. Finkelstein and Silberman suggest that Necho may have objected to Josiah's expansionist policies, which could have threatened the Egyptian dominance of the region to the west of Judah (the Philistine lands) or of the strategically important Jezreel Valley to its north, or could equally have objected to the effect of the new (deuteronomic) social policies on the caravan routes, which ran through southern Judah.

With Josiah's death Egypt became suzerain over Judah. The new king, Egypt's vassal ruler, undid Josiah's changes, restoring the former shrines and returning the country once again to religious pluralism. But when the Babylonian faction eventually won the Assyrian civil war, they set out to forcibly retake the former Assyrian tributaries. Judah, as a loyal Egyptian vassal-state, resisted, with disastrous consequences: the Babylonians plundered Jerusalem in 597 BCE and imposed their own vassal king; these events are described in the Bible and confirmed, with variations, in the Babylonian Chronicle. A few years later, the king of Judah rebelled against his Babylonian masters, and the Babylonians returned to destroy all the cities in Judah, burning Jerusalem to the ground in 587 BCE.

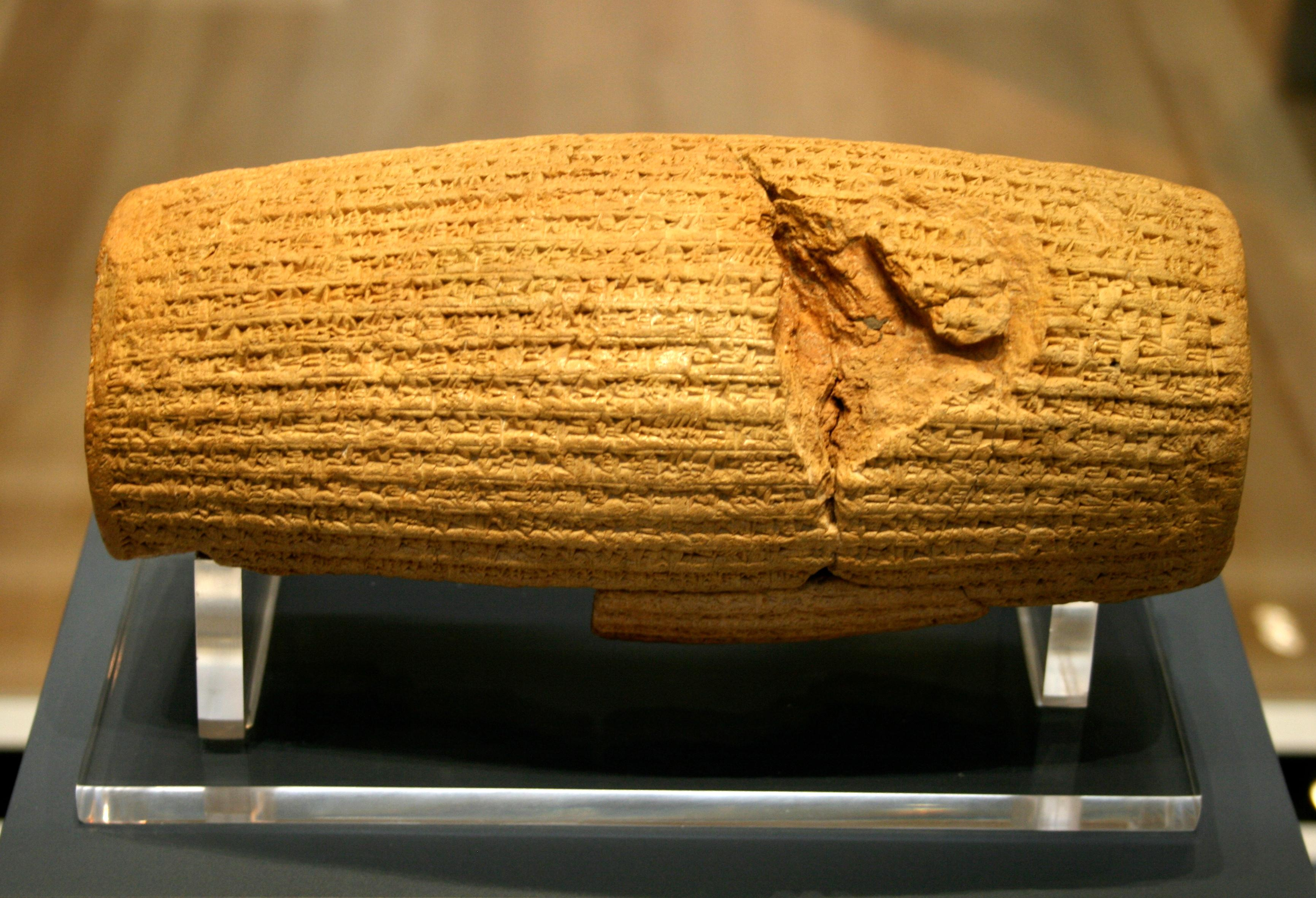
The Cyrus cylinder, a contemporary cuneiform document proclaiming Cyrus as legitimate king of Babylon.

In 539 BCE, the Achaemenids conquered Babylon, and, in accordance with their Zoroastrian perspective, allowed the people deported by the Babylonians to return; this is described by the Cyrus Cylinder, which also indicates that the Persians repaired the temples in these conquered lands, returning any sacred artifacts to them. According to the archaeological record, no more than 25% of the population had actually been deported; according to the Book of Ezra and its parallel passages in the First Book of Esdras, when the deportees began to return, their leader—Zerubbabel—refused to allow the undeported Israelites to assist them in reconstructing the Jerusalem temple, apparently believing that only the former deportees had the right to determine the beliefs and practices which could count as the orthodoxy. Although the undeported majority then tried to stop the reconstruction, Darius, the new Achaemenid king, eventually allowed it to continue.

The conflict between the returnees and those who had always been in Judah evidently required resolution; the two groups had to be reintegrated. Finkelstein and Silberman argue that the Deuteronomic law advanced by parts of the deported elite (the ancestors of the returnees), and the laws and legends of the inveterate inhabitants, were melded together into a single Torah so that it could form a central authority able to unite the population. Artaxerxes, Darius' grandson, commissioned Ezra to take charge of Judah, following the divine laws which Ezra was holding in his hand; The Bible Unearthed comments that academics like Richard Elliott Friedman propose that Ezra himself was the final redactor of the Torah, noting that the Bible identifies him as the scribe of the law of the god of heaven.

== Reception ==
The Bible Unearthed was well received by some biblical scholars and archaeologists and critically by others. Baruch Halpern, professor of Jewish Studies at Pennsylvania State University and leader of the archaeological digs at Megiddo for many years, called it "the boldest and most exhilarating synthesis of Bible and archaeology in fifty years", despite disagreeing with Finkelstein on the historicity of the United Monarchy. Jonathan Kirsch, writing in the Los Angeles Times, called it "a brutally honest assessment of what archeology can and cannot tell us about the historical accuracy of the Bible", which embraces the spirit of modern archaeology by approaching the Bible "as an artifact to be studied and evaluated rather than a work of divine inspiration that must be embraced as a matter of true belief". Phyllis Trible, professor of biblical studies at Wake Forest University, concluded her review in The New York Times as follows:

Finkelstein and Silberman have themselves written a provocative book that bears the marks of a detective story. In juxtaposing the biblical record and archaeological data, they work with tantalizing fragments of a distant past. Assembling clues to argue their thesis requires bold imagination and disciplined research. The Bible Unearthed exhibits both in abundance. Imagination invariably exceeds the evidence; research makes plausible the reconstruction. Fortunately, the book does not achieve its goal: "to attempt to separate history from legend." It is better than that, for it shows how intertwined they are. What actually happened and what a people thought happened belong to a single historical process. That understanding leads to a sobering thought. Stories of exodus from oppression and conquest of land, stories of exile and return and stories of triumphal vision are eerily contemporary. If history is written for the present, are we doomed to repeat the past?

A review of the book by fellow archaeologist William G. Dever was published in the Biblical Archaeology Review and subsequently in the Bulletin of the American Schools of Oriental Research. At the outset of the review, Dever described the book as a "convoluted story", writing that "This clever, trendy work may deceive lay readers". What proceeded was heated exchanges between Dever and Finkelstein. Dever's review noted that the book had many strengths, notably archaeology's potential for re-writing the history of "Ancient Israel", but complained that it misrepresented his own views and concluded by characterizing Finkelstein as "idiosyncratic and doctrinaire". Finkelstein's reaction was to call Dever a "jealous academic parasite," and the debate quickly degenerated from that point.

Evangelical Christian biblical scholar Kenneth Kitchen was critical, writing that "[A] careful critical perusal of this work—which certainly has much to say about both archaeology and the biblical writings—reveals that we are dealing very largely with a work of imaginative fiction, not a serious or reliable account of the subject", and "Their treatment of the exodus is among the most factually ignorant and misleading that this writer has ever read." Another evangelical, Richard Hess, also being critical, wrote that "The authors always present their interpretation of the archaeological data but do not mention or interact with contemporary alternative approaches. Thus the book is ideologically driven and controlled."

Writing for the July/August 2006 issue of Biblical Archaeology Review, Michael D. Coogan of Stonehill College, editor of The New Oxford Annotated Bible, argues that Finkelstein and Silberman "move from the hypothetical to the improbable to the absurd." According to Coogan, Finkelstein's revised chronology for the cities attributed to David and Solomon is "not accepted by the majority of archaeologists and biblical scholars".

The book became a bestseller within its field. In February 2009, Amazon.com ranked it as the 8th most popular in the fields of Old Testament Christian Theology, and the Archaeology of Christianity, as well as being the 22nd most popular book on the history of Israel. In 2006, the popularity of the text led to a four-part documentary series upon it, which was subsequently broadcast on The History Channel.

Several books were published in response to The Bible Unearthed:

- Who Were the Early Israelites and Where Did They Come From? by William G. Dever;
- David's Secrets Demons (2004) by Baruch Halpern;
- On the Reliability of the Old Testament (2006) by Kenneth Kitchen.

== See also ==
- Dating the Bible#Torah
- Biblical archaeology

== Bibliography ==
- Finkelstein, Israel; Silberman, Neil Asher, The Bible Unearthed: Archaeology's New Vision of Ancient Israel and the Origin of Its Sacred Texts. Simon & Schuster, 2002 ISBN 0-684-86912-8 at Internet Archive
