= Israel Finkelstein =

Israeli archaeologist and professor

- ישראל פינקלשטיין
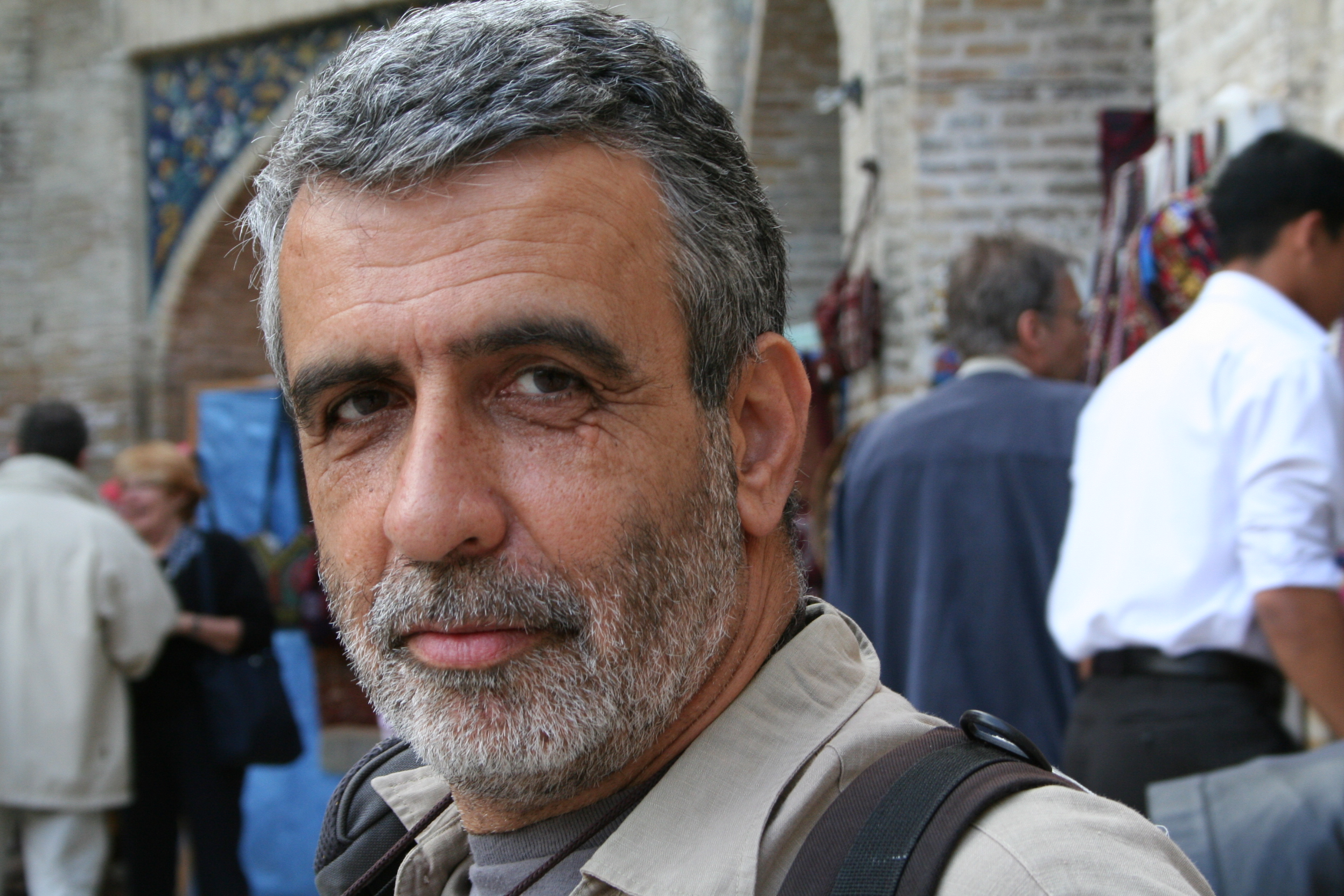
- Finkelstein in c. 2010
- Born: March 29, 1949 (age 77); Tel Aviv, Israel
- Education: Tel Aviv University
- Known for: The Bible Unearthed
- Spouse: Joelle Cohen
- Children: 2
- Awards: Dan David Prize
- Scientific career
- Fields: Archaeology
- Workplaces: Tel Aviv University; University of Haifa
- Website: israelfinkelstein.wordpress.com

Israel Finkelstein (Hebrew: ישראל פינקלשטיין; born March 29, 1949) is an Israeli archaeologist, professor emeritus at Tel Aviv University and the head of the School of Archaeology and Maritime Cultures at the University of Haifa. Finkelstein is active in the archaeology of the Levant and is an applicant of archaeological data in reconstructing biblical history. Finkelstein is the current excavator of Megiddo, a key site for the study of the Bronze and Iron Ages in the Levant. Finkelstein's fieldwork in northern Israel and the West Bank, as well as his development of the "Low Chronology", upended prior archaeological assessments by showing that the Kingdom of Israel was substantially larger and more prosperous when it coexisted alongside the Kingdom of Judah. Finkelstein has used these insights to challenge the biblical narrative that David and Solomon ruled a united monarchy of Israel and Judah from Jerusalem in the 10th century BCE.

Finkelstein is a member of the Israel Academy of Sciences and Humanities an associé étranger of the French Académie des Inscriptions et Belles-Lettres, and International Honorary Member of the American Academy of Arts and Sciences. In 2005, he won the Dan David Prize for his study of the history of Israel in the 10th and 9th centuries BCE. In 2009, he was named chevalier of the Ordre des Arts et des Lettres by the French Minister of Culture, and in 2010, received a doctorate honoris causa from the University of Lausanne. He is a member of the selection committee of the Shanghai Archaeology Forum, the Chinese Academy of Social Sciences.

Among Finkelstein's books are The Bible Unearthed: Archaeology's New Vision of Ancient Israel and the Origin of its Sacred Texts (2001) and David and Solomon: In Search of the Bible's Sacred Kings and the Roots of the Western Tradition (2006), co-written with Neil Asher Silberman. Also he wrote the textbooks on the emergence of Ancient Israel, titled The Archaeology of the Israelite Settlement (1988); on the archaeology and history of the arid zones of the Levant, titled Living on the Fringe (1995); and on the Northern Kingdom of Israel, titled The Forgotten Kingdom (2013). Other books deal with biblical historiography: Hasmonean Realities Behind Ezra, Nehemiah and Chronicles (2018), Essays on Biblical Historiography: From Jeroboam II to John Hyrcanus (2022), and Jerusalem The Center of the Universe (2024).

== Background ==
=== Family ===
Israel Finkelstein was born to an Ashkenazi Jewish family in Tel Aviv, Israel, on March 29, 1949. His parents were Zvi (Grisha) Finkelstein and Miriam Finkelstein (née Ellenhorn). His great-grandfather on his mother's side, Shlomo Ellenhorn, came to Palestine from Grodno (today in Belarus) in the 1850s and settled in Hebron. He was one of the first physicians in the Bikur Cholim Hospital in Jerusalem, and is listed among the group of people who purchased the land in 1878 in order to establish Petah Tikva – the first modern Jewish settlement in Palestine outside the four holy cities. Finkelstein's father emigrated from Ukraine. Finkelstein is married to Joelle (née Cohen). They are the parents of two daughters.

=== Education ===
Israel Finkelstein attended the PICA elementary school (1956–1963) and Ahad Ha'am High School (1963–1967), both in Petah Tikva. He then served in the Israel Defense Forces (1967–1970). He studied archaeology and Near Eastern civilizations, and geography at Tel Aviv University, receiving his BA in 1974. While there, Finkelstein was a student of Prof. Yohanan Aharoni. He continued as a research student under the supervision of Prof. Moshe Kochavi, receiving his MA in 1978 (thesis on Rural Settlement in the Yarkon Basin in the Iron Age and Persian-Hellenistic Periods). He graduated as a PhD in 1983 with a thesis titled "The Izbet Sartah Excavations and the Israelite Settlement in the Hill Country".

== Academic career ==
From 1976 to 1990, Finkelstein taught at the Department of Land of Israel Studies, Bar-Ilan University, beginning as a teaching assistant. He spent the academic year of 1983–84 in a research group led by Prof. Yigael Yadin in the Institute of Advanced Studies in the Hebrew University, Jerusalem. In 1986/1987, Finkelstein taught at the Department for Near Eastern Languages and Civilizations, University of Chicago. In 1987 he was appointed an associate professor with tenure at Bar-Ilan University and in 1990 moved to the Department of Archaeology and Ancient Near Eastern Civilizations at Tel Aviv University. In 1992/93 Finkelstein spent a sabbatical year as a visiting scholar at the Department of Near Eastern Languages and Civilizations, Harvard University. Since 1992, he has been a Full Professor at Tel Aviv University. He served as the chairperson of the Department of Archaeology and Near Eastern Studies (1994–1998) and as Director of The Sonia and Marco Nadler Institute of Archaeology (1996–2003). In 1998–1999 Finkelstein was a visiting scholar in the Centre de Recherche d'Archéologie Orientale and the École Pratique des Hautes Études in the Sorbonne, Paris.

Finkelstein was the editor of Tel Aviv, the journal of the Institute of Archaeology of Tel Aviv University (2008–2021), and the executive editor of the Monograph Series by the Institute of Archaeology, Tel Aviv University (2005–2021). He is a member of editorial boards, including the Palestine Exploration Quarterly and the Archaeology and Biblical Studies series of the Society of Biblical Literature.

== Fieldwork ==
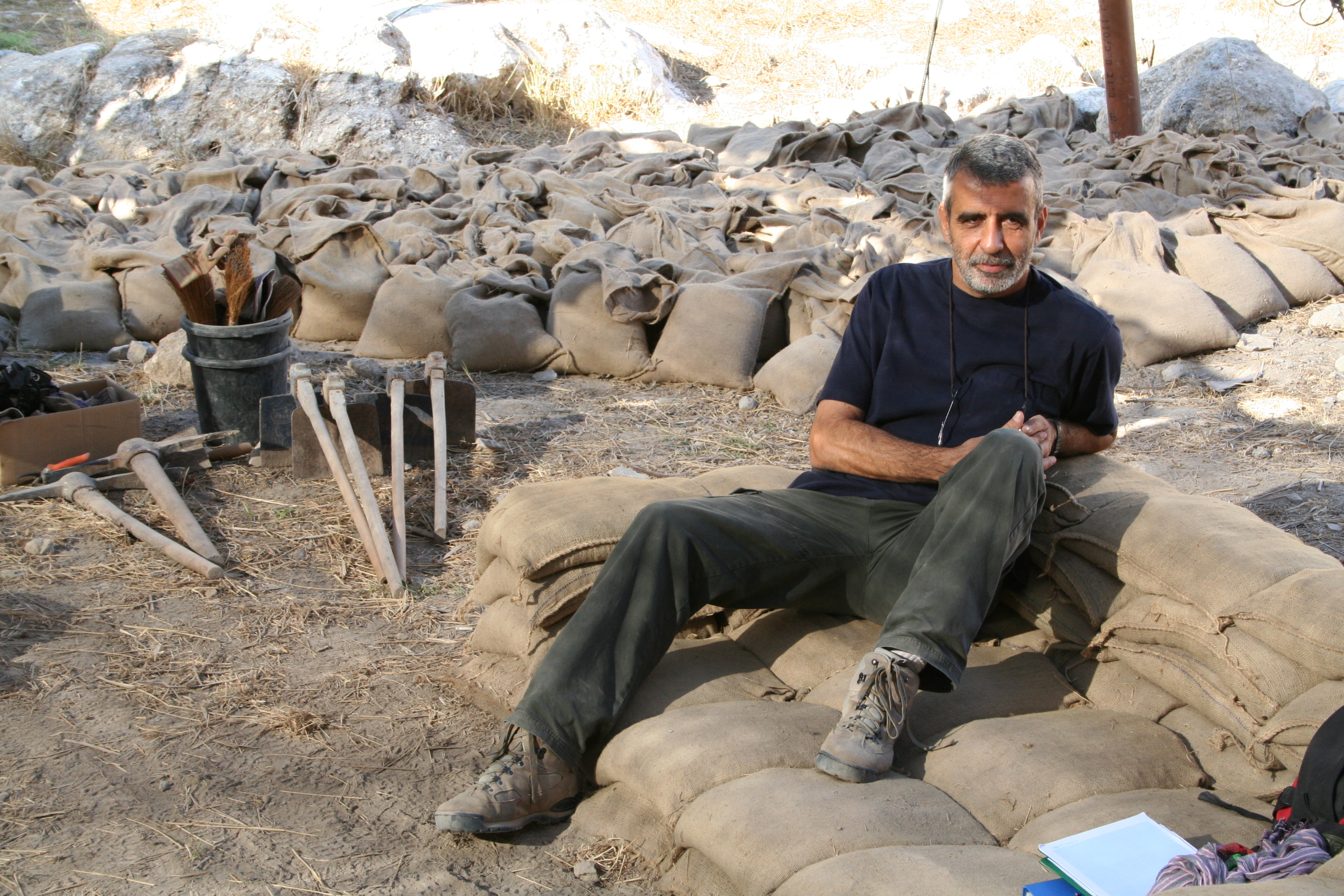
Directing excavations at Tel Meggido

Finkelstein was trained as a field archaeologist in the excavations of Tel Beer Sheva (1971, Director: Yohanan Aharoni) and Tel Aphek (1973–1978, Directors: Moshe Kochavi and Pirhiya Beck). Starting in 1976, he carried out his own fieldwork in a variety of sites and regions:

=== Past excavations and surveys ===
In 1976–1978, he field-directed (under Prof. Moshe Kochavi) the excavations at 'Izbet Sartah, an Iron I–IIA village-site east of Tel Aviv. In the same years he conducted surveys of Byzantine monastic remains in southern Sinai, and directed salvage excavations at the mound of ancient Bene Beraq near Tel Aviv. In 1980, Finkelstein co-directed (together with I. Beit-Arieh and B. Cresson) the excavation of Tel Ira, an Iron II site in the Beer-sheba Valley

In the 1980s Finkelstein moved to projects in the highlands. He directed the excavation at biblical Shiloh, a site which features Middle Bronze, Late Bronze and Iron I remains (for the results, see I. Finkelstein, editor, Shiloh: The Archaeology of a Biblical Site, Tel Aviv 1993). Another comprehensive project was the Southern Samaria Survey, which covered an area of ca. 1,000 km^{2} in the highlands north of Jerusalem. In parallel, he carried out soundings at sites northeast of Jerusalem: Khirbet ed-Dawwara, an Iron I–IIA site in the desert fringe near Jerusalem; and the Intermediate Bronze site of Dhahr Mirzbaneh.

Finkelstein's most extensive field work is the excavation at Megiddo (1994–present: co-directors David Ussishkin until 2012, and Matthew J. Adams and Mario A.S. Martin since 2014). Megiddo is considered one of the most important Bronze and Iron Age sites in the Levant.

In 2006–2020, Finkelstein was co-director of excavations and geo-archaeology work in the Iron Age sites of Atar Haroa and Nahal Boqer, and the Intermediate Bronze Age sites of Mashabe Sade and En Ziq (with Ruth Shahack-Gross).

In 2017–2019, Finkelstein co-directed the Shmunis Family Excavations at Kiriath-Jearim, a biblical site in the highlands west of Jerusalem associated with the Ark Narrative in the Book of Samuel (with Christophe Nicolle and Thomas Römer, the College de France).

== Other projects ==
In 2009–2014, Finkelstein was principal investigator of a European Research Council-funded project titled Reconstructing Ancient Israel: The Exact and Life Sciences Perspectives (with Steve Weiner of the Weizmann Institute of Science as co-Principal Investigator). The project was organized into 10 tracks dealing with radiocarbon dating, ancient DNA, geoarchaeology, paleoclimate, petrography, metallurgy, daily mathematics, advanced imaging of ostraca, residue analysis and archaeozoology. Samples were taken from a large number of sites in Israel and Greece.

Another project focused on the petrography of the Amarna clay tablets (1997–2022 with Yuval Goren and Nadav Na'aman; the results were published in: Y. Goren, I. Finkelstein and N. Na'aman; Inscribed in Clay: Provenance Study of the Amarna Letters and other Ancient Near Eastern Texts, Tel Aviv 2004.

Other studies dealt with the paleoclimate of the Levant (2009–2019, with Dafna Langgut of Tel Aviv University and Thomas Litt of the University of Bonn); The Archaeological and Historical Realities behind the Pentateuch (2016–2019, with Konrad Schmid of the University of Zurich, Thomas Römer and Christophe Nihan of the University of Lausanne and Oded Lipschits of Tel Aviv University); ancient DNA of animals and Humans (2009–present, with Meirav Meiri of Tel Aviv University, in cooperation with Joseph Maran and Philipp Stockhammer of the Universities of Heidelberg and Munich, Liran Carmel of the Hebrew University, and David Reich of Harvard University).

Another project is the study of 'Digital Epigraphy', in which algorithmic methods were introduced to the study of Iron Age Hebrew inscriptions, 2008–present, with Eli Piasetzky of Tel Aviv University. This study was later expanded, introducing computer science methods to the investigation of biblical texts (with Barak Sober of the Hebrew University and Eli Piasetzky of Tel Aviv University).

== Scholarly contributions ==
Finkelstein has written on a variety of topics, including the archaeology of the Bronze Age and the exact and life sciences contribution to archaeology. Much of his work has been devoted to the Iron Age and, more specifically, to questions related to the history of Ancient Israel.

=== Emergence of Ancient Israel ===
The classical theories on the emergence of Israel viewed the process as a unique event in the history of the region. Finkelstein suggested that it was a long-term process of a cyclical nature. He demonstrated that the wave of settlement in the highlands in the Iron Age I (c. 1150–950 BCE) was the last in a series of such demographic developments – the first had taken place in the Early Bronze and the second in the Middle Bronze. The periods between these peaks were characterized by low settlement activity. Finkelstein explained these oscillations as representing changes along the sedentary/ pastoral-nomadic continuum, which were caused by socioeconomic and political dynamics. Hence, a big portion of the people who settled in the highlands in the early Iron Age were locals of a pastoral-nomadic background. Others, who originated from local sedentary background, moved to the highlands as a result of the Bronze Age collapse – which in turn was related to a long period of dry climate in c. 1250–1100 BCE. Since eventually these groups formed the Northern Kingdom of Israel, they can be labeled "Israelites" as early as their initial settlement process.

Finkelstein regards the biblical account on the Conquest of Canaan in the Book of Joshua as an ideological manifesto of the Deuteronomistic author/s of the late 7th century BCE, describing a "conquest to be" under King Josiah of Judah rather than a historical event at the end of the Bronze Age. He proposed that the original Conquest Account may have originated in the Northern Kingdom of Israel in the early 8th century BCE; it could have been influenced by memories of the turmoil that had taken place in the lowlands in the late Iron I (10th century BCE), rather than the end of the Late Bronze Age (late 12th century BCE).

=== Low Chronology ===
Until the 1990s, the chronology of the Iron Age in the Levant had been anchored in the biblical account of the great United Monarchy of David and Solomon. Accordingly, the Iron I ended ca. 1000 BCE and the Iron IIA was dated from 1000 BCE until the campaign of Pharaoh Sheshonq I (biblical Shishak) ca. 925 BCE. The two Iron IIA palaces at Megiddo were conceived as the material manifestation for the Solomonic Empire. While preparing for the excavations at Megiddo in the early 1990s, Finkelstein noticed difficulties in this scheme. Noteworthy among them is the appearance of similar traits of material culture at Megiddo in a layer that was dated to the time of King Solomon in the middle of the 10th century, and at Samaria and Jezreel in contexts dated to the time of the Omride Dynasty (of the Northern Kingdom of Israel) in the early 9th century BCE. To resolve these difficulties, Finkelstein proposed to "lower" the dates of the Iron Age strata in the Levant by several decades.

According to Finkelstein's Low Chronology, the Iron Age I lasted until the middle of the 10th century BCE, while the Iron IIA is dated between the middle of the 10th century and ca. 800 BCE, if not slightly later. This means that the Megiddo palaces and other features which had traditionally been attributed to the time of King Solomon – features which date to the late Iron IIA – should indeed be associated with the endeavors of the Omride Dynasty in the first half of the 9th century BCE. A big debate ensued. Starting in the late 1990s, the focus of the discussion shifted to the interpretation of radiocarbon determinations for organic samples from key sites, such as Tel Rehov and Megiddo. All in all, the radiocarbon results put the Iron I/IIA transition ca. the middle of the 10th century (rather than 1000 BCE as had traditionally been proposed), and the Iron IIA/B transition in the early days of the 8th century (rather than ca. 925 BCE). These data have far-reaching implications far beyond the Levant, first and foremost for the chronology of the Aegean basin.

In parallel, and not directly connected, Finkelstein dealt with the chronology of Philistine pottery of the Iron Age I. The traditional theory fixed the appearance of Philistine pottery – and hence the settlement of the Philistines in the southern coastal plain of the Levant – in accordance with the confrontation between Ramses III and the Sea Peoples in the early 12th century BCE. In other words, Philistine pottery appears during the last phase of Egyptian rule in Canaan. Finkelstein proposed that the locally made Monochrome pottery known from several sites in Philistia, which is widely understood as representing the earliest phase of Philistine settlement, should be dated after the withdrawal of Egypt from Canaan in the 1130s.

Finkelstein sees the biblical description of the time of David and Solomon as multilayered. He acknowledges the historicity of the founders of the Davidic Dynasty, places them in the 10th century BCE, and considers the possibility that the description of the rise of David to power conceals old memories of his activity as a leader of an ʿApiru-band that was active in the southern fringe of Judah. Yet, he sees the description of a great United Monarchy as an ideological construct that represents the ideology of late-monarchic author/s in the late 7th century BCE, first and foremost the pan-Israelite ideology of the days of King Josiah of Judah. According to him, the historical David and Solomon ruled over a small territory in the southern highlands – a territory not very different from that of Jerusalem of the Late Bronze Age. Finkelstein sees much of the description of King Solomon as representing realities from late monarchic times. He understands the description of the Philistines in the Bible as portraying realities in Philistia in late-monarchic times.

==== Criticism of the Low Chronology ====
Finkelstein's theories about Saul, David and Solomon have been criticized by fellow archaeologists. Amihai Mazar described Finkelstein's Low Chronology proposal as "premature and unacceptable". Amnon Ben-Tor accused him of employing a "double standard", citing the biblical text where it suited him and deploring its use where it did not. Other criticisms came from William G. Dever (who dismissed the Low Chronology as "idiosyncratic"), Lawrence Stager, Doron Ben-Ami, Raz Kletter and Anabel Zarzeki-Peleg. David Ussishkin, despite agreeing with many of Finkelstein's theories about the United Monarchy, has also shown doubts and reservations about Finkelstein's Low Chronology.

A 2004 debate between Finkelstein and William G. Dever, mediated by Hershel Shanks (editor of the Biblical Archaeology Review), quickly degenerated into insults, with Dever calling Finkelstein "idiosyncratic and doctrinaire" and Finkelstein dismissing Dever as a "jealous academic parasite". Dever later accused Finkelstein of supporting post-Zionism, to which Finkelstein replied by accusing Dever of being "a biblical literalist disguised as a liberal". Shanks described the exchange between the two as "embarrassing".

According to an evangelical dictionary from 2005, most archaeologists were not accepting the Low Chronology, but the number of its adepts was slowly growing.

Amihai Mazar responded to the Low Chronology with a compromise solution, the Modified Conventional Chronology, which got more traction. The problem is that MCC is silent upon many key events. Ussishkin thinks that the dispute between the three chronologies does not admit a solution.

=== "New Canaan" ===
Following the results of the excavations at Megiddo, Finkelstein argued that the material culture of the Iron I in the northern valleys continues that of the Late Bronze Age. In other words, the collapse of the Late Bronze city-states under Egyptian domination in the late 12th century BCE was followed by revival of some of the same centers and rise of others in the Iron I. He termed this phenomenon "New Canaan". Accordingly, the major break in the material culture of Canaan took place at the end of the Iron I in the 10th century BCE rather than the end of the Late Bronze Age. Finkelstein associated the violent destruction of the revived city-states with the expansion of the highlanders (early Israelites). He suggested that memories of the turmoil in the lowlands in the late Iron I can be found in northern traditions regarding skirmishes with Canaanite cities which appear in the heroic stories in the Book of Judges.

=== The Northern Kingdom ===
Finkelstein dealt with a variety of themes related to the archeology and history of the Northern Kingdom of Israel. He proposed that the first North Israelite territorial polity emerged in the Gibeon-Bethel plateau in the late Iron I and early Iron IIA. He found archaeological evidence for this in the system of fortified sites, such as Tell en-Nasbeh, Khirbet ed-Dawwara, et-Tell ("Ai") and Gibeon. Historical evidence for the existence of this polity can be found in the campaign of Pharaoh Sheshonq I in this region in the middle-to-second half of the 10th century BCE. According to Finkelstein, positive memories in the Bible of the House of Saul, which originated from the North, represent this early Israelite entity. He suggested that this north Israelite polity ruled over much of the territory of the highlands, that it presented a threat to the interests of Egypt of the 22nd Dynasty in Canaan, and that it was taken over during the campaign of Sheshonq I.

Finkelstein proposed that in its early days, the Northern Kingdom (Jeroboam I and his successors) ruled over the Samaria Highlands, the western slopes of the Gilead and the area of the Jezreel Valley. The expansion of Israel further to the north came during the days of the Omride Dynasty in the first half of the 9th century BCE, and even more so in the time of Jeroboam II in the first half of the 8th century BCE. Finkelstein described the special features of Omride architecture and, with his Megiddo team, dealt with different subjects related to the material culture of the Northern Kingdom, such as metallurgy and cult practices.

Finkelstein also reflected on biblical traditions related to the Northern Kingdom, such as the Jacob cycle in Genesis (a study carried out with Thomas Römer), the Exodus tradition, the heroic stories in the Book of Judges and remnants of royal traditions in the Books of Samuel and Kings. He suggested that these North Israelite traditions were first committed to writing in the days of Jeroboam II (first half of the 8th century BCE), that they were brought to Judah with Israelite refugees after the takeover of Israel by Assyria, and that they were later incorporated into the Judahite-dominated Bible. Finkelstein sees the biblical genre of deploying "history" in the service of royal ideology as emerging from Israel (the North) of the 8th century BCE.

=== Archaeology and history of Jerusalem ===
Finkelstein has recently dealt with the location of the ancient mound of Jerusalem (with Ido Koch and Oded Lipschits). The conventional wisdom sees that "City of David" ridge as the location of the original settlement of Jerusalem. Finkelstein and his colleagues argued that the "City of David" ridge does not have the silhouette of a mound; that it is located in topographical inferiority relative to the surrounding area; and that the archaeological record of the ridge does not include periods of habitation attested in reliable textual records. According to them, the most suitable location for the core of ancient Jerusalem is the Temple Mount. The large area of the Herodian platform (today's Harem esh-Sharif) may conceal a mound, which – similar to other capital cities in the Levant – included both the royal compound and habitation quarters. Locating the mound of Ancient Jerusalem on the Temple Mount resolves many of the difficulties pertaining to the "City of David" ridge.

According to Finkelstein, the history of Jerusalem in biblical times should be viewed in terms of three main phases:

- Firstly, until the 9th century BCE, Jerusalem was restricted to the mound on the Temple Mount and ruled over a modest area in the southern highlands. Accordingly, Jerusalem of the time of David and Solomon can be compared to Jerusalem of the Amarna period in the 14th century BCE: it had the size of a typical highlands mound (for instance, Shechem), ruled over a restricted area, but still had impact beyond the highlands.
- Secondly, the first expansion of Jerusalem came in the 9th century BCE, perhaps in its second half, when the town grew significantly in a southerly direction. Remains of the Iron IIA were unearthed south of al-Aqsa Mosque, above the Gihon Spring and to the south of the Dung Gate of the Old City. In parallel to this development, Judah expanded to the Shephelah in the west and Beer-sheba Valley in the south, and for the first time became a territorial kingdom rather than a city-state restricted to the highlands.
- Thirdly, the most impressive phase in the settlement history of Jerusalem commenced in the late 8th century BCE and lasted until its destruction by the Babylonians in 586 BCE. At that time Jerusalem expanded dramatically, to include the entire "City of David" ridge, as well as the "Western Hill" (the Armenian and Jewish Quarter of today's Old City). This expansion was the result of the arrival of Israelite refugees after the demise of the Northern Kingdom in 722–720 BCE. These groups brought with them traits of Northern material culture, and more important – their foundation myths, royal traditions and heroic stories. These Northern traditions were later incorporated into the Judahite Bible.

=== Jerusalem and Yehud/Judea of the Persian and Hellenistic periods ===
Finkelstein noted that in the Persian Period, Jerusalem was limited to the mound on the Temple Mount – and even there was sparsely settled – and that Yehud of that time was also thinly settled. As the description of the construction of the wall of Jerusalem in Nehemiah 3 must relate to the big city (extending beyond the old mound on the Temple Mount), it probably portrays the construction of the fortifications by the Hasmoneans.

Finkelstein further noted that many of the sites mentioned in the lists of returnees in Ezra and Nehemiah were not inhabited in the Persian Period and hence sees these lists as reflecting the demographic situation in days of the Hasmoneans. The same holds true, in his opinion, for the genealogies in 1 Chronicles. Finkelstein then looked into the accounts of Judahite monarchs in 2 Chronicles, which do not appear in Kings. He called attention to similarities between these texts and 1 Maccabees, and proposed to understand Chronicles as representing legitimacy needs of the Hasmoneans. This means that at least 2 Chronicles dates to the late 2nd century BCE, probably to the days of John Hyrcanus.

=== Scribal activity in Israel and Judah ===
Dating the appearance of inscriptions and the dissemination of writing in Israel and Judah has far-reaching implications in the study of the material culture of the Hebrew Kingdom and in biblical historiography. Finkelstein dealt with three aspects of this theme. (a) With Benjamin Sass, he suggested a new dating method for the alphabetic inscriptions which predate ca. 800 BCE. In the past, dating these inscriptions was based on assumptions which stemmed from interpretation of biblical texts, for instance the mention of scribes in the court of King David in the 10th century BCE. Yet, this is a circular argument, as biblical texts may portray realities of the time of their authors more than the situation in the past. Therefore, Finkelstein and Sass focused on the archaeological contexts of the inscriptions: the layer in which a given inscription was found, its relative chronology according to the ceramic assemblage, and absolute chronology according to 14c dating. They showed that Proto-Canaanite writing continued until the 9th century BCE and that Hebrew writing did not appear before the very late 9th century. (b) Following the same method – of scrutinizing the archaeological contexts of ancient inscriptions – Finkelstein dated the beginning of scribal activity in Judah to the late 8th century BCE (about a century later than in Israel) and showed that writing disseminated there only in the 7th century. (c) A research group which was headed by Finkelstein (with Eli Piasetzky and others) introduced computer science methods to the study of First Temple period Hebrew ostraca. The group concentrated on two avenues: multi-spectral imaging of inscriptions, and the number of "hands" in the Samaria and Arad ostraca; the latter enables better understanding of literacy and ability to compose biblical texts in Israel and Judah.

=== Archaeology of Jordan ===
On the archaeology of Jordan, Finkelstein suggested (with Oded Lipschits) a reconstruction of the Genesis of Moab and pointed to architecture characteristics of the Omride dynasty (Israel) in two sites in Moab which are mentioned in the late 9th-century BCE Mesha inscription. In addition, he discussed the settlement history of the Transjordanian highlands, the copper industry in the eastern Arabah Valley, and sites in the Gilead, Ammon and Edom.

=== Archaeology and history of arid zones ===
A central theme in Finkelstein's work (with Ruth Shahak-Gross and others) is the archaeology and history of the arid zones, especially the Negev Highlands. Finkelstein concentrated on two waves of activity in this area. (a) The Early Bronze and the Intermediate Bronze. He showed that this wave of activity took place in the Early Bronze III and the first half of the Intermediate Bronze (ca. 2900–2200 BCE). The inhabitants of the sites engaged in animal husbandry but did not practice seasonal agriculture. The main impetus for this settlement wave was demand of copper in Old Kingdom of Egypt, which accelerated copper production in the Arabah Valley. Activity in the Negev Highlands sites ceased with the decline of the Old Kingdom. (b) An early phase of the Iron Age (ca. 950–850 BCE). The focus is on sites which were previously described as fortresses constructed by the United Monarchy of Ancient Israel. Finkelstein and his associates showed that they were built by the local inhabitants, who, in this case too, engaged in animal husbandry but not in seasonal agriculture. And yet again, the prosperity in the region was linked to copper production in the Arabah Valley. Another project focused on water cisterns and reservoirs in the region. It showed that the "open" (not rock-cut) water reservoirs, which had been dated solely to the Iron Age, were in fact the most common method of water-supply from the Early Bronze to medieval times.

=== Archaeological science ===
Finkelstein played a pioneering role in the introduction of exact and life sciences methods and techniques to archaeology. He put special emphasis on advanced dating methods, first and foremost radiocarbon, but also archaeo-magnetism and OSL (Optically Stimulated Luminescence). He also engaged in studies of geo-archaeology (looking at sediments from ancient sites to identify subsistence patterns of their inhabitants), molecular residues in ceramic vessels (which points to early trade link with the Far East) and archaeo-metallurgy.

Three fields are of special interest: (a) Paleoclimate of the Levant according to pollen in sediments extracted from the Sea of Galilee and the Dead Sea (with DafnaLanggut). The study revealed patterns of climate change in the Bronze and Iron Ages; especially important is evidence for a dry period in the later part of the Late Bronze Age, that was a prime mover in the collapse of ancient civilizations during the "Crisis Years"; at the end of the Bronze Age. (b) A study of Ancient DNA of Bronze and Iron Age individuals (with researchers from the Hebrew University and Harvard), which pointed to migration of groups from the northeast of the ancient Near East to the Levant in the third and second millennia BCE. (c) Introduction of computer science methods to the study of ancient inscriptions and texts. One track – regarding Hebrew ostraca—was described above; another track (with Eli Piasetzky, Nahum Dershovitz and Thomas Römer) deals with attempts to distinguish between genres in the biblical text.

=== Hebrew Bible authorship ===
Finkelstein has written extensively on the authorship and composition of the Hebrew Bible based on archaeological insights into the history of ancient Israel. In 2025, Finkelstein summarized his findings as follows:

As far as I can judge, the earliest texts in the Bible were composed in the Kingdom of Israel in the first half of the 8th century BCE. Composition of texts intensified in the 7th century [BCE] in Judah, mainly in the days of King Josiah. The latest texts were put in writing around the 2nd century BCE.

Finkelstein coauthored a 2025 study that used word-frequency analysis to establish probable authorship of several biblical passages of uncertain origin, "including the Book of Esther, the so-called 'Ark Narrative' in the first and second books of Samuel, and stories about Abraham in the Book of Genesis."

== Published works ==
=== Books ===
In addition to the excavation reports cited above.

- Sinai in Antiquity, Tel Aviv, 1980, in Hebrew (ed., with Zeev Meshel).
- The Archaeology of the Israelite Settlement, Jerusalem, 1988, ISBN 965-221-007-2.
- Archaeological Survey of the Hill Country of Benjamin, Jerusalem, 1993, ISBN 965-406-007-8 (ed., with Yitzhak Magen).
- From Nomadism to Monarchy: Archaeological and Historical Aspects of Early Israel, Jerusalem, 1994, ISBN 965-217-117-4 (ed., with Nadav Na'aman).
- Living on the Fringe: The Archaeology and History of the Negev, Sinai and Neighbouring Regions in the Bronze and Iron Ages, Sheffield, 1995, ISBN 1-85075-555-8.
- The Bible Unearthed: Archaeology's New Vision of Ancient Israel and the Origin of Its Sacred Texts, New York, 2001, ISBN 0-684-86912-8 (with Neil Asher Silberman). Translated to twelve languages.
- David and Solomon: In Search of the Bible's Sacred Kings and the Roots of the Western Tradition, New York, 2006, ISBN 0-7432-4362-5 (with Neil Asher Silberman). Translated to six languages.
- The Quest for the Historical Israel: Debating Archeology and the History of Early Israel, Atlanta, 2007, ISBN 978-1-58983-277-0 (with Amihai Mazar).
- Un archéologue au pays de la Bible, Montrouge, 2008, six articles revised and translated from English illustrating the development of Biblical archeology since 1970, ISBN 978-2-227-47521-2.
- The Forgotten Kingdom: The Archaeology and History of Northern Israel, Society of Biblical Literature (from the SBL website), Atlanta, 2013.
- Hasmonean Realities behind Ezra, Nehemiah and Chronicles, Atlanta, 2018.
- Aux origines de la Torah: nouvelles rencontres, nouvelles perspectives, Montrouge, 2019, another thematic selection of revised articles for which there is no English-language equivalent, ISBN 978-2-227-49470-1 (with Thomas Römer).
- Essays on Biblical Historiography: From Jeroboam II to John Hyrcanus, Tübingen, 2022.
- Jerusalem the Center of the Universe: Its Archaeology and History (1800-100 BCE), Atlanta, 2024, ISBN 978-1-62837-601-2.

=== Articles ===
About 450 scholarly articles. For many of them, see the list of publications at Academia.edu.

- Israel Finkelstein, Eran Arie, Mario A.S. Martin & Eli Piasetzky, New Evidence on the Late Bronze/Iron I Transition at Megiddo: Implications for the End of the Egyptian Rule and the Appearance of Philistine Pottery, Ägypten und Levante 27, 2017 pp.261-280 PDF
- Israel Finkelstein, Dafna Langgut, Meirav Meiri & Lidar Sapir-Hen, Egyptian Imperial Economy in Canaan: Reaction to the Climate Crisis at the End of the Late Bronze Age, Ägypten und Levante 27, 2017, pp. 249-260 PDF

=== Festschrifts ===
Finkelstein has co-edited festschrifts for Nadav Na'aman, Benjamin Sass and David Ussishkin as well as being honoured with two himself:

- Bene Israel: Studies in the Archaeology of Israel and the Levant during the Bronze and Iron Ages in Honour of Israel Finkelstein, Leiden and London, 2008 (eds. Alexander Fantalkin and Assaf Yasur-Landau).
- Rethinking Israel: Studies in the History and Archaeology of Ancient Israel in Honor of Israel Finkelstein, Winona Lake, 2017 (eds. Oded Lipschits, Yuval Gadot and Matthew J. Adams).

== YouTube series ==
The Shmunis Family Conversations in the Archaeology and History of Ancient Israel with Israel Finkelstein series is a YouTube series hosted by the W.F. Albright Institute of Archaeological Research's Albright Live YouTube Channel.

== Awards and recognition ==
Finkelstein is the Laureate of the Dan David Prize in 2005. The select committee noted that he is "widely regarded as a leading scholar in the archaeology of the Levant and as a foremost applicant of archaeological knowledge to reconstructing biblical Israelite history. He excels at creatively forging links between archaeology and the exact sciences and he has revolutionized many of these fields. … Finkelstein has had an impact on radically revising the history of Israel in the 10th and 9th centuries BCE. He has transformed the study of history and archaeology in Israeli universities, moving from a 'monumental' to a 'systemic' study of the archaeological evidence."

In 2014, Finkelstein was awarded the Prix Delalande Guérineau: Institut de France, l'Académie des Inscriptions et Belles-Lettres, for his book Le Royaume biblique oublié (The Forgotten Kingdom).

He is the recipient of the 2017 MacAllister Field Archaeology Award from the American Society of Overseas Research.

His other awards include the French decoration of Chevalier de l'ordre des Arts et des Lettres, (2009) and the Doctorat honoris causa of the University of Lausanne (2010).
