= Neil Asher Silberman =

American historian (born 1950)

Neil Asher Silberman (born June 19, 1950 in Boston, Massachusetts) is an American archaeologist and historian with a special interest in biblical archaeology. He is the author of several books, including The Hidden Scrolls, The Message and the Kingdom: How Jesus and Paul Ignited a Revolution and Transformed the Ancient World (with Richard Horsley), The Bible Unearthed: Archaeology's New Vision of Ancient Israel and the Origin of Its Sacred Texts (with Israel Finkelstein), and Digging for God and Country. A graduate of Wesleyan University, he studied Near Eastern archaeology at the Hebrew University of Jerusalem. Awarded a 1991 Guggenheim Fellowship, he is a contributing editor to Archaeology and a member of the editorial board of the International Journal of Cultural Property. He served as the president of the ICOMOS International Scientific Committee on Interpretation and Presentation (ICIP) and was a member of the ICOMOS International Advisory Committee and Scientific Council from 2005–2015. In 2015 he was named a Fellow of US/ICOMOS.

With Israel Finkelstein, Silberman wrote The Bible Unearthed: Archaeology's New Vision of Ancient Israel and the Origin of Its Sacred Texts (2001) and David and Solomon: In Search of the Bible's Sacred Kings and the Roots of the Western Tradition (2006). His other books on the themes of history, heritage, and contemporary society include Archaeology and Society in the 21st Century (2001); Heavenly Powers (1998); The Message and the Kingdom (1997); The Archaeology of Israel (1995); Invisible America (1995); The Hidden Scrolls (1994); A Prophet from Amongst You: The Life of Yigael Yadin (1993); Between Past and Present (1989); and Digging for God and Country (1982).

Since 1998 Silberman has been involved in the field of public heritage interpretation and presentation, working on various projects in Europe and the Middle East. From 2004 to 2007 he served as director of the Ename Center for Public Archaeology and Heritage Presentation in Belgium. In 2008 he was appointed to the faculty of the Department of Anthropology of the University of Massachusetts Amherst and became one of the founders of its Center for Heritage and Society. In 2012 he became a managing partner of Coherit Associates, an international heritage consultancy specializing in heritage policy and in public engagement programs.
