= Karl Heinrich Graf =

German Old Testament scholar (1815–1869)

Karl Heinrich Graf (February 28, 1815 – July 16, 1869) was a German Old Testament scholar and orientalist. He was born at Mülhausen (now Mulhouse) in Alsace and died in Meissen in Saxony.

He studied Biblical exegesis and oriental languages at the University of Strassburg under Édouard Reuss, and, after holding various teaching posts, was made instructor in French and Hebrew at the Landesschule of Meissen, receiving in 1852 the title of professor.

Graf was one of the chief founders of Old Testament criticism. In his principal work, Die geschichtlichen Bücher des Alten Testaments (1866) he sought to show that the priestly legislation of Exodus, Leviticus and Numbers is of later origin than the book of Deuteronomy. He still, however, held the accepted view, that the Elohistic narratives formed part of the Grundschrift and therefore belonged to the oldest portions of the Pentateuch.

The reasons urged against the contention that the priestly legislation and the Elohistic narratives were separated by a space of 500 years were so strong as to induce Graf in an essay, Die sogenannte Grundschrift des Pentateuchs, published shortly before his death, to regard the whole Grundschrift as post-exilic and as the latest portion of the Pentateuch. The idea had already been expressed by Reuss, but since Graf was the first to introduce it into Germany, the theory, as developed by Julius Wellhausen, has been called the Graf-Wellhausen hypothesis.

Graf also wrote, a study of Jacques Lefèvre d'Étaples (Strassburg, 1842), Der Segen Moses Deut. 33 (1857) and Der Prophet Jeremia erklärt (1862). See T. K. Cheyne, Founders of Old Testament Criticism (1893); and Otto Pfleiderer's book translated into English by J. F. Smith as Development of Theology (1890).
