= Julius Wellhausen =

German theologian and orientalist (1844–1918)

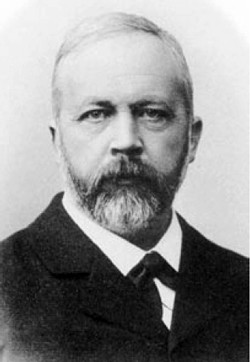
- Born: 17 May 1844; Hamelin, Hanover, Germany
- Died: 7 January 1918 (aged 73); Göttingen, Hanover, Germany
- Education: Göttingen
- Church: Lutheran
- Offices held: Professor of Old Testament at Göttingen, Greifswald, Halle and Marburg
- Title: Doctor

Julius Wellhausen (17 May 1844 – 7 January 1918) was a German biblical scholar and orientalist. In the course of his career, his research interest moved from Old Testament research through Islamic studies to New Testament scholarship. Wellhausen contributed to the composition history of the Pentateuch/Torah and studied the formative period of Islam. For the former, he is credited as one of the originators of the documentary hypothesis.

== Biography ==
Wellhausen was born at Hamelin in the Kingdom of Hanover. The son of a Protestant pastor, he later studied theology at the University of Göttingen under Georg Heinrich August Ewald and became Privatdozent for Old Testament history there in 1870. In 1872, he was appointed professor ordinarius of theology at the University of Greifswald. However, he resigned from the faculty in 1882 for reasons of conscience, stating in his letter of resignation:

"I became a theologian because the scientific treatment of the Bible interested me; only gradually did I come to understand that a professor of theology also has the practical task of preparing the students for service in the Protestant Church, and that I am not adequate to this practical task, but that instead despite all caution on my own part I make my hearers unfit for their office. Since then my theological professorship has been weighing heavily on my conscience."

He became professor extraordinarius of oriental languages in the faculty of philology at Halle, was elected professor ordinarius at Marburg in 1885 and was transferred to Göttingen in 1892, where he stayed until his death.

Among theologians and biblical scholars, he is best known for his book, Prolegomena zur Geschichte Israels (Prolegomena to the History of Israel); his work in Arabic studies (specifically, the magisterial work entitled The Arab Kingdom and its Fall) remains celebrated, as well. After a detailed synthesis of existing views on the origins of the first five books of the Bible, Wellhausen aimed at placing the development of these books into a historical and social context. The resulting argument, called the documentary hypothesis, became the dominant model for many biblical scholars and remained so for most of the 20th century.

According to Alan Levenson, Wellhausen considered theological anti-Judaism, as well as antisemitism, to be normative.

== Prolegomena zur Geschichte Israels and documentary hypothesis ==
Wellhausen was famous for his critical investigations into Old Testament history and the composition of the Hexateuch. He is perhaps best known for his Prolegomena zur Geschichte Israels (1883, first published in 1878 as Geschichte Israels) in which he advanced a definitive formulation of the documentary hypothesis. It argues that the Torah had its origins in a redaction of four originally-independent texts dating from several centuries after the time of Moses, their traditional author.

Wellhausen's hypothesis remained the dominant model for Pentateuchal studies until the last quarter of the 20th century, when it began to be advanced by other biblical scholars who saw more and more hands at work in the Torah and ascribed them to periods even later than Wellhausen had proposed.

Regarding his sources, Wellhausen described Wilhelm de Wette as "the epoch-making opener of the historical criticism of the Pentateuch." In 1806, De Wette provided an early, coherent mapping of the Old Testament writings of the J, E, D, and P, authors. Soon after, he was cast out of his university post. Young Julius Wellhausen thus largely continued the work of de Wette.

== Other works ==
A select list of his works are as follows:

- De gentibus et familiis Judaeis (Göttingen, 1870)
- Der Text der Bücher Samuelis untersucht (Göttingen, 1871)
- Die Phariseer und Sadducäer, a classic treatise upon this subject (Greifswald, 1874)
- Prolegomena zur Geschichte Israels (Berlin, 1882; 3rd edition, 1886; Eng. trans., Edinburgh, 1883, 1891; 5th German edition, 1899; first published in 1878 as Geschichte Israels; English translation Prolegomena to the History of Ancient Israel, Forgotten Books, 2008, ISBN 978-1-60620-205-0. Also available on Project Gutenberg )
- Muhammed in Medina, a translation of Al-Waqidi (Berlin, 1882)
- Die Composition des Hexateuchs und der historischen Bücher des Alten Testaments (1876/77, 3rd edition 1899)
- Israelitische und jüdische Geschichte (1894, 4th edition 1901)
- Reste arabischen Heidentums (1897)
- Das arabische Reich und sein Sturz, in its time the standard modern account of Umayyad history (1902), English translation The Arab Kingdom and its Fall (1927)
  - Urdu Translation: "Saltanat e Arab Aur Uska Suqoot".
- Skizzen und Vorarbeiten (1884–1899)
- Medina vor dem Islam (1889)
- New and revised editions of Friedrich Bleek's Einleitung in das Alte Testament (4–6, 1878–1893).
- Die kleinen Propheten, a critical brochure (1902)
- "The Book of Psalms" in Sacred Books of the Old Testament (Leipzig, 1895; Eng. trans., 1898)

In 1906 Die christliche Religion, mit Einschluss der israelitisch-jüdischen Religion appeared, in collaboration with Adolf Jülicher, Adolf Harnack and others. He also produced less influential work as a New Testament commentator, publishing Das Evangelium Marci, übersetzt und erklärt in 1903, Das Evangelium Matthäi and Das Evangelium Lucae in 1904, and Einleitung in die drei ersten Evangelien in 1905.

== Additional sources ==
- Gilman, D. C.; Peck, H. T.; Colby, F. M., eds. (1905). "Wellhausen, Julius" . New International Encyclopedia (1st ed.). New York: Dodd, Mead.
