= Prolegomena (disambiguation) =

Prolegomenon (usually plural prolegomena) is an Ancient Greek word (προλεγόμενον) used to mean "prologue" or "introduction", to introduce a larger work, e.g.: a book.

Prolegomena may also refer to:

- Prolegomena to Any Future Metaphysics by Immanuel Kant
- Prolegomena to a Theory of Language by Louis Hjelmslev
- Ibn Khaldun's Prolegomena, or Muqaddimah, an early Islamic treatise on world history, by Ibn Khaldun
- Prolegomena zur Geschichte Israels (Prolegomena to the History of Israel), a book by German biblical scholar Julius Wellhausen
