= Alan Levenson =

Alan T. Levenson holds the Schusterman/Josey Chair in Judaic History and was the Director of the Schusterman Center for Judaic and Israel Studies at the University of Oklahoma from 2015 until 2024, receiving the University of Oklahoma Regents’ Award for his stewardship of the Center. Levenson has written extensively on the modern Jewish experience for both scholarly and popular audiences. His book, Between Philosemitism and Antisemitism: Defenses of Jews and Judaism in Germany, 1871-1932 was nominated for a National Jewish Book Award Prize (paperback edition 2013), and his textbook, Modern Jewish Thinkers, is widely used in classes on Jewish thought. He has won a number of prestigious fellowships, including an ACLS, and has lectured in the United States, Israel and Germany. Since arriving at the University of Oklahoma, he has completed four major projects: The Making of the Modern Jewish Bible (2011), a history of Bible translations/commentaries in the modern era; and, as General Editor, The Wiley-Blackwell History of Jews and Judaism (2012), Joseph: Portraits Through the Ages (2016), and most recently Maurice Samuel: Life and Letters of a Secular Jewish Contrarian (2022). He received his BA/MA from Brown University magna cum laude, and his Ph.D. from Ohio State University. Levenson's works are found in libraries worldwide.

== Publications ==
- Maurice Samuel: Life and Letters of a Secular Jewish Contrarian (University of Alabama Press, 2022)
- Joseph: Portraits Through the Ages (University of Nebraska Press, 2016)
- Modern Jewish Thinkers: An Introduction (Rowman & Littlefield, 2002)
- Between Philosemitism and Antisemitism: Defenses of Jews and Judaism in Germany, 1871-1932 (University of Nebraska Press, 2004)
- The Making of the Modern Jewish Bible (Rowman & Littlefield, 2011)
- The Wiley-Blackwell History of Jew and Judaism (Wiley-Blackwell, 2012)
