= Friedrich Bleek =

German theologian (1793–1859)

Friedrich Bleek (4 July 1793, in Ahrensbök, Holstein – 27 February 1859, in Bonn) was a German Protestant theologian. He is considered one of the foremost biblical scholars in 19th-century Germany. He studied at Kiel and then at the University of Berlin, where De Wette, August Neander, and Friedrich Schleiermacher shaped his scholarly direction. He became a tutor at the university in 1818, and an assistant professor in 1823. He was appointed professor of theology at the University of Bonn, and held the position until his death.

== Life ==
At the age of 16, Bleek attended the gymnasium at Lübeck, where his interest in ancient languages led him to the study of theology. After his preparatory course at the gymnasium, he studied philosophy for two years at the University of Kiel. From 1814 to 1817, he studied under Wilhelm Martin Leberecht de Wette, Johann August Wilhelm Neander, and Friedrich Daniel Ernst Schleiermacher at the University of Berlin. After passing examinations for entering the ministry in 1818, Bleek was called back to Berlin as a tutorial fellow in theology, a temporary post obtained for him by the theological faculty.

In addition to fulfilling his duties in the theological seminary, he published two dissertations in Schleiermacher and G. C. F. Lücke's Journal (1819–1820, 1822), one on the origin and composition of the Sibylline Oracles, Über die Entstehung und Zusammensetzung der Sibyllinischen Orakel, and the other on the authorship and purpose of the Book of Daniel, Über Verfasser und Zweck des Buches Daniel.

Bleek's accomplishments were recognized by the minister of public instruction, who continued Bleek's stipend as Repetent for a third year and promised further advancement in due time. However the attitude of the political authority underwent a change. De Wette was dismissed from his professorship in 1819, and Bleek, a favorite pupil, came under government suspicion as an extreme democrat. Not only was his stipend as Repetent discontinued, but his nomination to the office of professor extraordinarius, which had already been signed by the minister Karl Altenstein, was withheld. Eventually it was found that Bleek had been confused with Baueleven Blech, and in 1823 he received the appointment.

During the six years that Bleek remained at Berlin, he twice declined a call to the office of Professor Ordinarius of Theology, first time at Greifswald and next time at Königsberg. In 1829, however, he was induced to accept Lücke's chair in the recently founded University of Bonn and took up his duties there that summer. He worked there for thirty years. In 1843 he was raised to the office of consistorial councillor and was selected by the university to hold the office of rector, a distinction which was not hitherto conferred upon any theologian of the Reformed Church. He died suddenly of apoplexy on 27 February, 1859.

== Family ==
In 1826 he married Auguste Seth; their youngest child Johannes became a preacher who also edited some of his father’s works.

== Writings ==
Bleek's works belong entirely to the domain of biblical criticism and exegesis. His views on questions of Old Testament criticism were advanced for the time; for on all the disputed points concerning the unity and authorship of the books of the Old Covenant he was opposed to received opinion. But with respect to the New Testament, his position was conservative. Bleek was an opponent of the Tübingen school, and his defence of the genuineness and authenticity of the Gospel of St John is among the ablest that have been written. Although on some minor points his views did not altogether coincide with those of the traditional school, his critical labors on the New Testament must be regarded as among the most important contributions to the maintenance of orthodox opinions.

His most known work was his commentary on the Epistle to the Hebrews (German: Brief an die Hebräer erläutert durch Einleitung, Ubersetzung, und fortlaufenden Commentar) in three parts issued in 1828, 1836 and 1840. It won the highest praise from men like De Wette and Franz Hermann Schulze-Delitzsch. Bleek abridged this work for his college lectures, and it was published in that condensed form in 1868. In 1846 he published his contributions to the criticism of the gospels (Beiträge zur Evangelien Kritik, pt. i.). This work contained his defence of St John's gospel and was developed from a review of J. H. A. Ebrard's Wissenschaftliche Kritik der Evangelischen Geschichte (1842).

== Posthumously published works ==
The following works were published after Bleek's death:

1. Introduction to the Old Testament (Einleitung in das Alte Testament), (3rd ed., 1869); Eng. trans. by G. H. Venables (from 2nd ed., 1869); in 1878 a new edition (the 4th) appeared, under the editorship of Julius Wellhausen, who made extensive alterations and additions
2. Introduction to the New Testament (Einleitung in das Neue Testament) (3rd ed., W Mangold, 1875), Eng. trans. (from 2nd German ed.) by William Urwick (1869, 1870)
3. Exposition of the First Three Gospels (Synoptische Erklärung der drei ersten Evangelien), ed. by H. Holtzmann (1862)
4. Lectures on the Apocalypse (Vorlesungen über die Apokalypse), (Eng. trans. 1875). Besides these there has also appeared a small volume containing Lectures on Colossians, Philemon and Ephesians (Berlin, 1865)

Bleek also contributed many articles to the Studien und Kritiken. For further information on Bleek's life and writings, see Kamphausen's article in Herzog-Hauck, Realencyklopädie; Frédéric Lichtenberger's Histoire des idées religieuses en Allemagne, vol. iii.; Diestel's Geschichte des Alten Testamentes (1869); and T. K. Cheyne's Founders of Old Testament Criticism (1893).
