= Holiness code =

Leviticus chapters 17–26

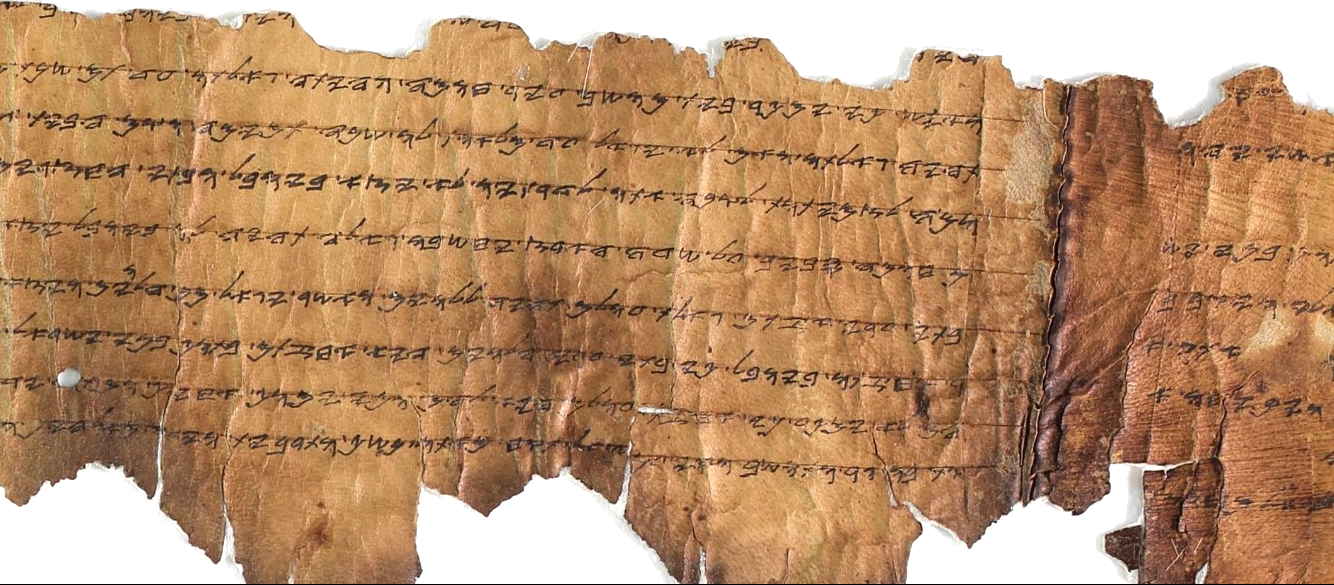
Part of the Paleo-Hebrew Leviticus scroll, which contains the oldest known copy of the Holiness Code.

The Holiness code is used in biblical criticism to refer to Leviticus chapters 17–26, and sometimes passages in other books of the Pentateuch, especially Numbers and Exodus. It is so called due to its highly repeated use of the word holy (Hebrew: קדוש qəḏōš). Kadash is usually translated as "holy", but originally meant "set apart", with "special", "clean/pure", "whole" and "perfect" as associated meanings. The term Holiness Code was first coined as the Heiligkeitsgesetz (literally "Holiness Law"; the word 'code' therefore means criminal code) by German theologian August Klostermann in 1877. Critical biblical scholars have regarded it as a distinct unit and have noted that the style is noticeably different from the main body of Leviticus. Unlike the remainder of Leviticus, the many laws of the Holiness Code are expressed very closely packed together, and very briefly.

According to most versions of the documentary hypothesis, the Holiness Code represents an earlier text that was edited and incorporated into the Priestly source and the Torah as a whole, although some scholars, such as Israel Knohl, believe the Holiness Code to be a later addition to the Priestly source. This source is often abbreviated as "H". Prof. Joel Baden has argued that H, uniquely within P, contains textual references to the Deuteronomist source. A date generally accepted by the proponents of the four-source hypothesis is sometime in the seventh century BC, when it presumably originated among the priests in the Temple in Jerusalem.

The Holiness Code also uses a noticeably different choice of vocabulary, repeating phrases such as I, Yahweh, am holy; I am Yahweh; and I am Yahweh, who makes you holy, (Note: Yahweh's name, written as 'YHWH' in the Hebrew Bible, has traditionally been rendered in English as the LORD (Adonai) or God by Jews and Christians. See Names of God in Judaism and Names of God in Christianity.) an unusually large number of times. Additionally, Leviticus 17 begins with This is the thing which Yahweh has commanded, saying ..., and Leviticus 26 strongly resembles the conclusion of a law code, despite the presence of further laws afterward, such as at Leviticus 27, giving the Holiness Code the appearance of a single distinct unit.

Professor Christine Hayes discusses a difference between the Holiness Code and the rest of Leviticus: in the Holiness Code, Israel itself is regarded as holy, not just the priestly class:

This theme, and the exhortation, "you shall be holy, for I the Lord your God am holy," they find their fullest expression in the block of text; Leviticus 17 through 26 that's referred to as the Holiness Code. There's an important difference between Leviticus 1 through 16 and the Holiness Code. According to Leviticus 1 through 16, Israel's priests are designated as holy: a holy class within Israel, singled out, dedicated to the service of God and demarcated by rules that apply only to them. Israelites may aspire to holiness, but it’s not assumed. However, in the Holiness Code, we have texts that come closer to the idea that Israel itself is holy by virtue of the fact that God has set Israel apart from the nations to himself, to belong to him, just as he set apart the seventh day to himself to belong with him.

== Identification of Holiness texts ==
Initially, the Holiness Code was considered part of the Priestly source by some scholars holding to the documentary hypothesis. However, other scholars generally believed it to have been an originally separate legal code (referred to as "H") which the Priestly source edited and chose to embed into their writing after. Some such editing is simply the addition of phrases such as And the LORD spake unto Moses, saying, speak unto the children of Israel, and say unto them, designed to put the code into the context of the remainder of a code being given by God, as is the case for the remainder of Leviticus.

By 1955, scholars agreed that the Holiness Code consisted of at least Leviticus 17–26, but some twenty passages outside of it were also identified as H, including Leviticus 11 (verses 1f. and 25–40 being contested), Numbers 15:34–41 and Exodus 31:13f..

=== H texts in Leviticus ===
- Leviticus 11 (verses 1f. and 25–40 contested)

It is also alleged by critical scholarship that several additional laws, written with a style unlike that of the Holiness Code but like that of the remainder of Leviticus, were inserted into the body of the text by the Priestly source. These alleged additions are:

- The prohibition against consuming the naturally dead (Leviticus 17:15–16)
- The order to make trespass offerings after sexual involvement with an engaged slavewoman (Leviticus 19:20–22)
- The prohibition against an anointed high priest uncovering his head or rending his clothes (Leviticus 21:10)
- The prohibition against offerings by Aaronic priests who are blemished (Leviticus 21:21–22)
- The order to keep the sabbath, passover, and feast of unleavened bread (Leviticus 23:1–10a)
- The order to keep Yom Kippur, and Sukkot (Leviticus 23:23–44)
- The order for continual bread and oil (Leviticus 24:1–9)
- Case law concerning a blasphemer (Leviticus 24:10–15a and 24:23)
- The order for a trumpet sounding on Yom Kippur (Leviticus 25:9b)
- Rules concerning redeeming property (Leviticus 25:23 and 25:26–34)
- Order to release Israelite slaves at the year of jubilee (Leviticus 25:40, 25:42, 25:44–46)
- Rules concerning redeeming people (Leviticus 25:48–52, and 25:54)

The section concerning continual bread and oil is, in critical scholarship, viewed as part of the description of the structure of the tabernacle, and vestments, present at the end of Exodus, which has accidentally become inserted at this point due to scribal error. The case law example of blasphemy is believed to be the work of one of the later editions of the Priestly source, in which several other case law examples were added, such as that concerning the daughters of Zelophehad (Numbers 36). The remainder of the alleged additions arguably deform the laws from the manner they would otherwise have, to the laws supported by the Priestly Code. Whether these represent alterations to the law over time, lawmaking by the writer of the political faction supported by the Priestly source, or simply details present but not originally thought worth mentioning, is a matter of some debate.

=== H texts in Exodus and Numbers ===
More recent critical scholarship, particularly that of Israel Knohl, and Jacob Milgrom, has argued instead that the Holiness Code (H) was the appendage, and the Priestly Code (P) the original. This view also identifies passages outside the traditional area of H, specifically in Exodus and Numbers, as belonging to the Holiness Code rather than P, such as the order to sound a trumpet on certain dates. In consequence, this view sees the author of H as the editor of P, rather than the reverse, in particular as P is able to be read coherently even when devoid of H. Nevertheless, the presence of what appears to be a clear ending to H (specifically Leviticus 26, which would be expected to have been moved), such as to be after Leviticus 27, if H were the addition, rather than the original, has presented some problems for such revising of the theory.

Israel Knohl (1995) argued that Numbers 25:6–18 and the entire chapter of Numbers 31 were part of the Holiness code (H), which was later added to the Priestly source. He pointed to similarities in content, such as the focus on purification in Numbers 5:1–4, chapter 19 and 31:19–24, as well as in linguistics in Numbers 10:9, 27:17, 31:6,19 and Exodus 40:15, all of which had been previously identified with the Holiness School (HS) by other scholars. Some linguistic and theological features also distinguish Numbers 31 from the Priestly Torah (PT) text, such as the wrath of God, which is mentioned several times by HS but never by PT. Some scholars think that the text of Numbers 25:6–18 was written at a time when the priestly line of Phinehas' descendants was being challenged. Sarah Shectman (2009) agreed with Knohl and other scholars that Numbers 25:6–18 is to be identified as an H text, and argued that traditional interpretations of verse 25:6 as an act of sexual transgression were incorrect. In fact, Zimri and Kozbi were not guilty of sexual transgressions at all; sex with a foreigner is never even considered a capital offence by the Holiness code (H). Rather, they had come too close to the holy Tabernacle, also called the 'Tent of the Congregation', an act which in previous episodes in the Book of Numbers (also probably authored by H) had also caused Yahweh to cast a plague on the Israelites, or to threaten doing so.

Texts in the books of Exodus and Numbers which have so far been identified as H texts by scholars include:

- Exodus 20:11 (contested)
- Exodus 20:18
- Exodus 31:12–17 (verses 16 and 17 contested)
- Exodus 40:15
- Numbers 5:1–4
- Numbers 8:19
- Numbers 10:9
- Numbers 15:34–41
- Numbers 17:11–12
- Numbers 19
- Numbers 25:6–18, see also Numbers 31 § Authorship and Numbers 31 § Motive
- Numbers 27:1–11
- Numbers 27:17
- Numbers 31
- Numbers 36:1–12

== Composition ==
The Holiness Code is a collection of many laws concerning several subjects. Critical scholarship therefore regards it as being generally a work constructed by the collecting together of a series of earlier collections of laws. One of the most noticeable elements of the work is a large section concerning various sexual activities, which are prohibited "lest the land vomit you out". These prohibitions include sexual relations with one's mother, step-mother, sister, step-sister, sister-in-law, aunt, granddaughter, daughter-in-law, with a woman as well as her daughter, with a ritually unclean woman, with the wife of a neighbor, with another man, or with an animal; and the sacrifice of children to Molech (numerated just prior to Lev.18:22. These prohibitions are listed in Leviticus 18, and again in chapter 20, both times with the warning "lest the land vomit you out."

While Leviticus 18 presents them as a simple list, Leviticus 20 presents them in a chiastic structure based on how serious a crime they are viewed, as well as presenting the punishment deemed appropriate for each, ranging from excommunication to execution. Leviticus 20 also presents the list in a more verbose manner.

Furthermore, Leviticus 22:11–21 parallels Leviticus 17, and there are, according to textual criticism, passages at Leviticus 18:26, 19:37, 22:31–33, 24:22, and 25:55, which have the appearance of once standing at the end of independent laws or collections of laws as colophons. For this reason, several scholars view the five sections preceding between each of these passages as deriving from originally separate documents. In particular, the two segments containing the sexual prohibitions, Leviticus 17:2–18:26 and Leviticus 20:1–22:33, are seen as being based on essentially the same law code, with Leviticus 20:1–22:33 regarded as the later version of the two.

Chapter 19, which ends in a colophon, has a similarity with the Ten Commandments (Ethical Decalogue), although presenting a more detailed and expanded version, leading critical scholars to conclude it represents a much later version of that decalogue. Notably, it contains the commandment popularly referred to as love thy neighbour as thyself (the Great Commandment).

By this reckoning, there are thus at least five earlier law collections which were redacted together, with an additional hortatory conclusion, to form the Holiness Code. Two of which contain a list of sexual prohibitions, and one of which was a development of the Ritual Decalogue.

== Comparison with other biblical law codes ==
Most critical scholars and religious commentaries regard the Holiness Code as bearing strong resemblance, in several places, to the writing of Ezekiel. Ezekiel dwells repeatedly on offences which the Holiness Code condemns, and spends little time concerned with those outside it (e.g. Leviticus 18:8–17 in comparison with Ezekiel 22:10–11), and several extensive lists of such parallels exist. There is also a great similarity between Ezekiel's writing and the hortatory elements, particularly the conclusion, of the Holiness Code. These strong similarities have led many critical scholars to question whether Ezekiel was the author of the code, or at least the collector, and it remains an open question whether the Holiness Code influenced Ezekiel, or Ezekiel influenced the Holiness Code.

The Holiness Code has a similarity of structure with both the Covenant Code and the Deuteronomic Code. Like these, it opens with a law regulating ceremonies at the altar, lists a series of disparate laws, and then closes with a set of promises for obeying the law, and curses for failing to do so. While some of the laws appear more developed than Deuteronomy, for example, the law concerning weights and measures is more detailed, the majority show less development, and the implication of multiple sanctuaries implied by the Holiness Code's laws, concerning altar ceremonies, is usually understood to imply a date prior to the banning of sanctuaries outside the temple at Jerusalem. A similar comparison with the Covenant Code implies that the date of the Holiness Code is between that of the Covenant Code, and that of the Deuteronomic Code, highly suitable for the position it finds itself within the Torah.

In the documentary hypothesis, the Priestly source is a work which, after its initial edition, suffered under the hand of several later, less skilled, editors, who each variously inserted documents, added additional laws, or expanded on the laws already present. Thus the original narrative, and the legal code within it, became surrounded by an extensive body of legal, and ritual, elements, as well as numerical, genealogical, and geographic, data. The underlying narrative, in the hypothesis, is based on JE, which already possessed a legal code, namely the Covenant Code and Ritual Decalogue. The majority of critical scholars thus support the position that, while the Ritual Decalogue was replaced by the Ethical Decalogue, the Holiness Code was chosen, or designed, to replace the Covenant Code.

== Modern view of Leviticus ==
The Holiness Code is believed to have been written as a form to avoid sexual deviations, sexually transmittable diseases and other forms of physical illness for the people of Israel with some specified as applicable for Proselytes. Some of its teachings are still in practice in the evangelical church, however see Leviticus 18 and Biblical law in Christianity for details.

Among Mainline Protestants, there is debate about how much of this passage can be applicable today since the Levitical priesthood and animal sacrifice ended in AD 70, with the destruction of Jerusalem by the Romans. Many in these groups see references to sexuality therein and as being reiterated for emphasis elsewhere in the Bible; for example, in the Epistle to the Romans. Orthodox Jews continue many of the practices, but they generally regard precepts not in current practice as being in only temporary abeyance until a Third Temple can be rebuilt and they can be restored.

== See also ==
- Leviticus 18 and Leviticus 19
- Outward holiness
- Q-D-Š
