= Ten Commandments (disambiguation) =

The Ten Commandments are a set of biblical principles relating to ethics and worship, which play a fundamental role in Judaism and most forms of Christianity.

Ten Commandments may also refer to:

== Rules ==
- Ritual Decalogue, the laws listed in the Book of Exodus, 34:11–26
- Ten Commandments for Drivers
- Ten Commandments of Computer Ethics
- "Hutu Ten Commandments", a propaganda document published in 1990 in Rwanda
- Alternatives to the Ten Commandments, secular and humanist alternatives to the biblical list
- The Ten Commandments of the Mafia, the ten primary rules of the mafia

== Film and TV ==
- The Ten Commandments (1923 film), a 1923 silent film directed by Cecil B. DeMille, starring Theodore Roberts
- The Ten Commandments (1945 film), an Italian film
- The Ten Commandments (1956 film), a 1956 epic film directed by Cecil B. DeMille, starring Charlton Heston
- The Ten Commandments (2007 film), an animated film starring the voices of Ben Kingsley and Christian Slater
- The Ten Commandments: The Musical, a 2006 musical film starring Val Kilmer as Moses
- The Ten Commandments (miniseries), a two-part 2006 television mini-series, directed by Robert Dornhelm
- Exodus: Gods and Kings, a 2014 film starring Christian Bale, which was based on the biblical story of Moses and the Ten Commandments
- Os Dez Mandamentos (Moses and the Ten Commandments), a 2015 Brazilian primetime telenovela
- The Ten Commandments: The Movie, a 2016 Brazilian film based on the 2015 primetime telenovela

== Music ==
=== Musicals ===
- Les Dix Commandements (musical), a 2000 French musical by Élie Chouraqui and Pascal Obispo
- Ten Dual Commandments, A song in the musical Hamilton

=== Albums ===
- Ten Commandments (Ozzy Osbourne album), 1990
- Ten Commandments (Sammi Cheng album), 1994
- The Ten Commandments (Malevolent Creation album), 1991, the first album from the death metal band Malevolent Creation

=== Songs ===
- "Ten Commandments" (song), a song by Lil' Mo, 2002
- "Ten Commandments", a song by New Model Army (band), 1986
- "Ten Commandments", a song by Prince Buster, 1963

== Places ==
- The Ten Commandments On Earth, one of the names for The Cross (Barre, Massachusetts)

== See also ==
- "Ten Crack Commandments", a song by The Notorious B.I.G.
- Ten Commandments in Catholic theology
- Decalogue (disambiguation)
- Les Dix Commandements (disambiguation) (French: The Ten Commandments)
- The Eleventh Commandment (disambiguation)
- 613 commandments
- The 614th Commandment
