= Decalogue (disambiguation) =

The Decalogue is the Ten Commandments, the list of ethical principles in Exodus 20:1–17 and Deuteronomy 5:6–21.

Decalogue may also refer to:

- Ritual Decalogue, also called the Ten Commandments by some, the laws listed in the Book of Exodus, 34:11–26
- Dekalog, a 1989 series of ten films by Krzysztof Kieślowski based on the Ten Commandments
- Virgin Decalog, book collections of Doctor Who short stories published by Virgin Publishing
- The Decalogue of a Ukrainian Nationalist, principles of the OUN
- "Decalogue", satirical poem by Ambrose Bierce
- Decalogue (album), a 2009 album by Stoupe the Enemy of Mankind
- The Decalogue (album), a 2019 album by Timo Andres and Sufjan Stevens

== See also ==
- Ten Commandments (disambiguation)
- Decalogue Stone (disambiguation)
- Deckalogue
