= Leviticus 18 =

Chapter of the Bible

- ← chapter 17 chapter 19 →
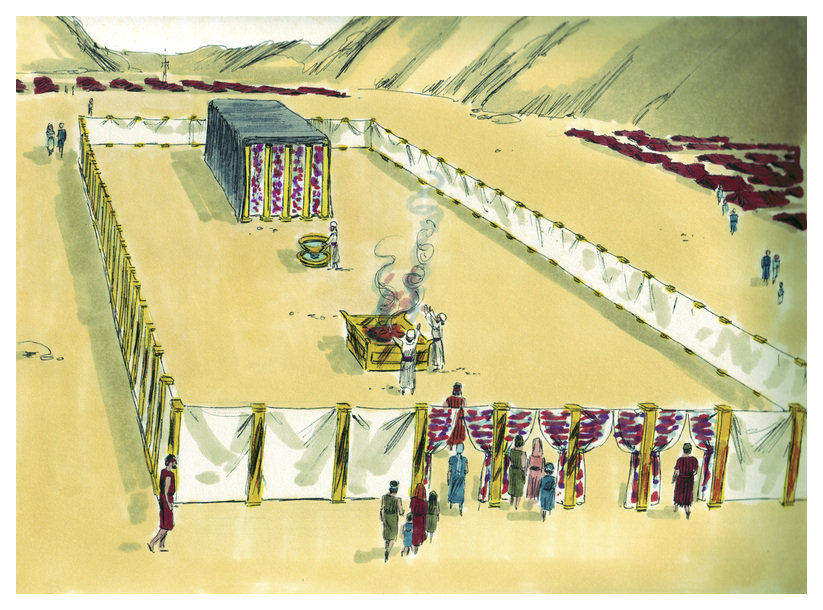
- "Tabernacle", Biblical illustrations, Sweet Media, 1984
- Book: Book of Leviticus
- Hebrew Bible part: Torah
- Order in the Hebrew part: 3
- Category: Torah
- Christian Bible part: Old Testament
- Order in the Christian part: 3

Leviticus 18 (the eighteenth chapter of the Book of Leviticus) deals with a number of sexual activities considered abominable, including incest and bestiality. The chapter also condemns Moloch worship. It is part of the Holiness Code (Leviticus 17–26), and its sexual prohibitions are largely paralleled by Leviticus 20, except that chapter 20 has more emphasis on punishment.

Leviticus 18:22 has traditionally been interpreted as prohibiting homosexual acts, but its meaning is debated, with some scholars suggesting it applies only to specific contexts like adultery, rape, or incest and others arguing it evolved over time.

== Text ==
The original text of Leviticus 18, like that of most of the Hebrew Bible, is written in Hebrew. The oldest extant versions of the text in Hebrew are found in the Dead Sea Scrolls, the Samaritan Pentateuch, and the Masoretic Text. An ancient Greek translation from the third century BCE, the Septuagint, also exists. Since the addition of chapter divisions in the thirteenth century CE, this chapter is divided into 30 verses.

The chapter begins with God speaking to Moses (verse 1) and giving him a message for the Israelites (2), warning them to keep God's laws rather than Canaanite or Egyptian practices (3–5). Then God is quoted as listing people with whom sex is forbidden due to family relationships (6–19). In verse 20, God prohibits sexual relations with a neighbor's wife, and in verse 21 God prohibits passing one's children through fire to Moloch. Verse 22 is the famous verse about "lie with a man," discussed below, while in verse 23 God forbids bestiality, and, according to some translations, pedophilia. In the final verses (24–30), God warns that breaking these laws will produce defilement and that the Canaanites are about to be displaced from the land of Canaan as a result of following these practices, and warn of a similar fate for the Israelites if they fall into these practices.

== Incest ==
The Bible lists several types of relationship which it regards as incestuous unions; one list appears in the Deuteronomic Code, and two lists occur in the Holiness Code of Leviticus. These lists only mention relationships with female relatives; excluding lesbianism, which implies that the list is addressed to men. These lists then compare as follows:

Forbidden for men only
Forbidden for women only
Forbidden for both men and women

			Leviticus 18	Leviticus 20	Deuteronomy
Grandparent's spouse (including other grandparent)					
Parent's spouse		Parent			
Parent's spouse		Stepparent			
Parent-in-law					
Uncle/Aunt	Parent's sibling				
Uncle/Aunt	Uncle's/Aunt's Spouse	Father's sibling's spouse			
Uncle/Aunt	Uncle's/Aunt's Spouse	Mother's sibling's spouse			
Parent's child	Half-Sibling (mother's side)				
Parent's child	Father's child	Sibling			
Parent's child	Father's child	Half-Sibling (father's side)			
Brother's wife					(Permitted if the brother died childless (Levirate marriage))
Step sibling					
Sibling-in-law (if the spouse was still alive)					
Nephew/Niece	Sibling's child				
Nephew/Niece	Nephew/Niece-in-law	Spouse's brother's child			
Nephew/Niece	Nephew/Niece-in-law	Spouse's sister's child			
Spouse's child		Child			
Spouse's child		Stepchild			
Child-in-law					
Spouse's grandchild (including grandchild)					

One feature of all the lists is that sexual activity between a man and his daughter is not explicitly forbidden. The Talmud argues that this is because the prohibition was obvious, especially given the proscription against a relationship with a granddaughter. The shortness of the list in Leviticus 20, and especially of that in Deuteronomy, is explained by classical Jewish scholarship as being due to the obviousness of the missing prohibitions. The explicit prohibition against engaging in sexual activity with "both a woman and her daughter" implicitly forbids sexual activity between a man and his daughter, as does the prohibition against engaging in sexual activity with "any that is near of kin". Some biblical scholars have instead proposed that it was originally in the list but was then accidentally left out from the copy on which modern versions of the text ultimately depend, due to a mistake by the scribe.

However, most tribal nations also disliked exogamous marriage to completely unrelated people. In several prominent cases in the Torah, incestuous relationships are described. In the biblical narrative, each of these occurred chronologically prior to the establishment of Levitical law. Abraham married his half-sister Sarah, Jacob married his first wife's sister (albeit without his knowledge), and Amram married his paternal aunt Jochebed.

Apart from the questionable case of a man marrying his daughter, the list in Leviticus 18 roughly produces the same rules as were followed in early pre-Islamic Arabic culture.

== Homosexuality ==
Leviticus 18:22 in the Hebrew Bible:

וְאֶ֨ת־זָכָ֔ר לֹ֥א תִשְׁכַּ֖ב מִשְׁכְּבֵ֣י אִשָּׁ֑ה תּֽוֹעֵבָ֖ה הִֽוא:

— Leviticus 18:22, Westminster Leningrad Codex (WLC)

A word-by-word analysis of the WLC Hebrew text of Leviticus 18:22:

Hebrew (WLC)	Transliteration	English
וְאֶ֨ת־	wə-'eṯ-	And DOM
זָכָ֔ר	zā-ḵār,	a male
לֹ֥א	lō	not
תִשְׁכַּ֖ב	ṯīš-kaḇ	you shall lie down
מִשְׁכְּבֵ֣י	mīš-kə-ḇē	beds of/coitally (Note: The word מִשְׁכְּבֵי, miš-kə-ḇê is the construct form of the masculine noun מִשְׁכַּב, miš-kaḇ, which in turn comes from the verb שָׁכַב, šā-ḵaḇ, meaning 'to lie [down]'. The noun מִשְׁכַּב, miš-kaḇ is defined as both a physical place of lying-down (i.e. bed, couch, bier) and the act of lying-down (i.e. for sleep, for intercourse). Strong's Concordance lists 46 occurrences of מִשְׁכַּב, miš-kaḇ. Of those 46, the KJV translates it as 'bed' 34 times, 'bedchamber' 4 times, 'couch' 1 time, and miscellaneous verb forms of 'lying' 7 times. The construct מִשְׁכְּבֵי, miš-kə-ḇê appears only three times in the Bible – twice in Leviticus as מִשְׁכְּבֵ֣י אִשָּׁ֑ה, miš-kə-ḇê 'iš-šāh and once in Genesis 49:4 as מִשְׁכְּבֵ֣י אָבִ֑יךָ, miš-kə-ḇê 'ā·ḇî·ḵā, which is translated as "[to] the bed of your father." Therefore, מִשְׁכְּבֵ֣י אִשָּׁ֑ה, miš-kə-ḇê 'iš-šāh can mean either 'the bed of a woman' or 'the lying-down of a woman'.)
אִשָּׁ֑ה	'īš-šā;	a woman
תּוֹעֵבָ֖ה	tō-'ē-ḇā	an abomination
הִֽוא׃	hī'	it

Leviticus 18:22 has been translated in common English versions as:

Thou shalt not lie with mankind, as with womankind: it is abomination.

— Leviticus 18:22, King James Version

Do not lie with a male as one lies with a woman; it is an abhorrence.

— Leviticus 18:22, JPS Tanakh

You shall not lie with a male as with a woman; it is an abomination.

— Leviticus 18:22, Revised Standard Version and English Standard Version

You shall not lie with a male as with a woman; such a thing is an abomination.

— Leviticus 18:22, New American Bible

Do not practice homosexuality, having sex with another man as with a woman. It is a detestable sin.

— Leviticus 18:22, New Living Translation

The Hebrew wording of Leviticus 18:22 has been traditionally interpreted as prohibiting some or all homosexual acts, although which precise acts, and in which situations, is a matter of ongoing scholarly debate. Some authors state that verse 22 condemns "homosexuality" or "homosexual relations", with other authors maintaining that it condemns only males penetrating males (anal intercourse). Others believe due to study of the language used in the original Hebrew, that the restriction is only relevant in specific situations (in the context idolatry, religious sacrifice or various forms of rape which were common Canaanite or Egyptian practices), and specifically does not apply to modern homosexual relationships. Some researchers speculate that the contents of the text changed over time, where earlier examples would only admonish homosexual incest, and not homosexuality, more broadly in line with surrounding attitudes at the time. Such readings have also been responded to and countered in research.

Lesbianism is not explicitly prohibited in the Torah; however, the rabbi and Jewish scholar Maimonides ruled that lesbianism was prohibited nonetheless as an "Egyptian practice" (Note: Verse 3.) and deserving of punishment by beating.

== Weekly Torah portion ==
The whole chapter is part of the weekly Torah portion (parashah) Acharei Mot (אַחֲרֵי מוֹת) which comprises Leviticus 17:1–18:30.
