= Tzitzit =

Knotted threads on the corners of a tallit gadol or qatan in Judaism

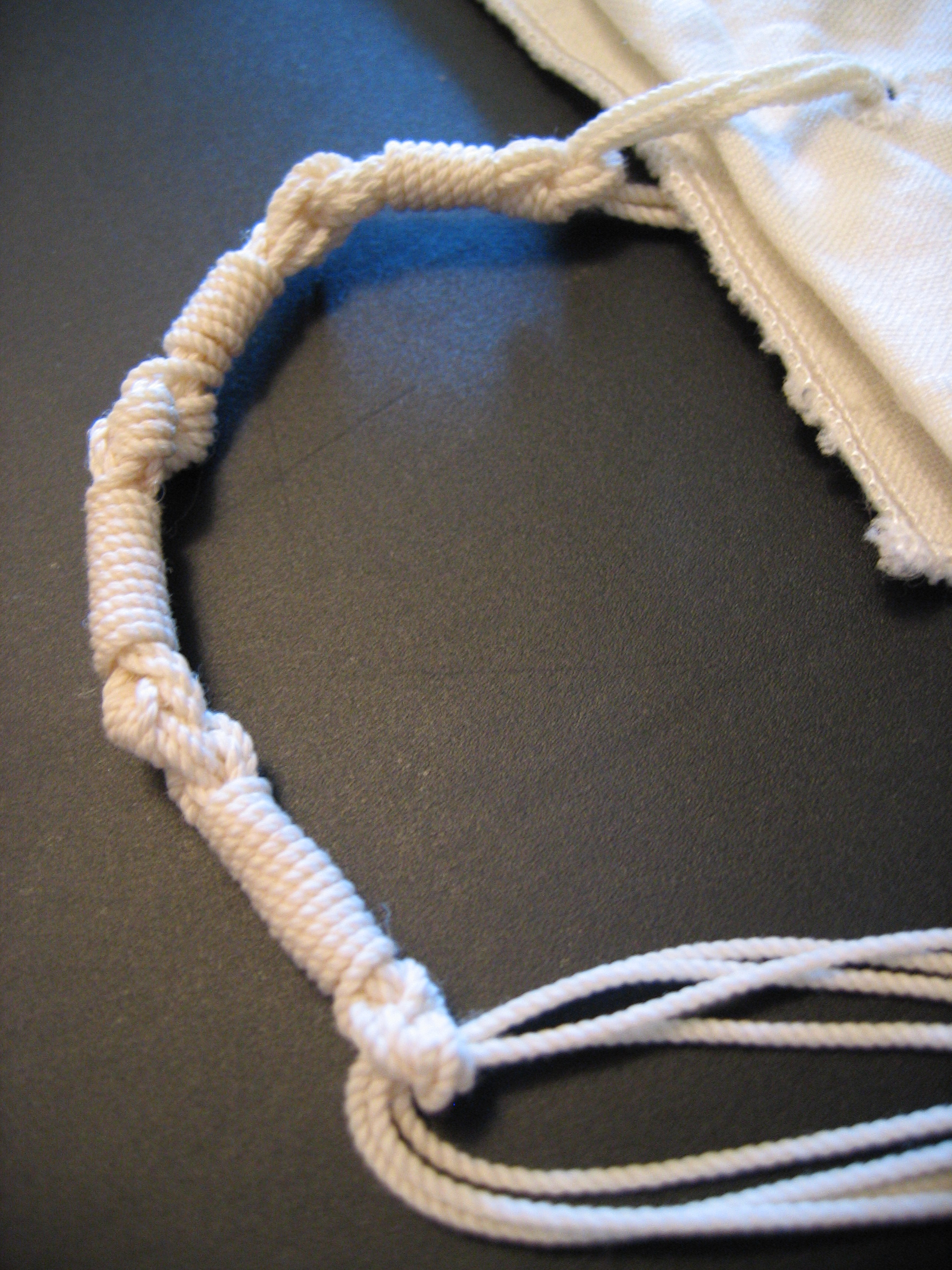
- Tzitzis

Halakhic texts relating to this article
- Torah: Numbers 15:38 and Deuteronomy 22:12
- Babylonian Talmud: Menachos 39-42
- Mishneh Torah: Ahavah (Love): Tzitzit
- Shulchan Aruch: Orach Chayim 8-25

Tzitzit (Hebrew: צִיצִית, romanized: ṣīṣīṯ, [tsiˈtsit]; plural צִיצִיּוֹת ṣiṣiyyōṯ, Ashkenazi: tsitsis; and Samaritan: ࠑࠉࠑࠉࠕ ṣeṣet) are specially knotted ritual fringes, or tassels, worn in antiquity by Israelites and also modern observant Jews and Samaritans. Tzitzit are usually attached to the four corners of the tallit gadol (prayer shawl), usually referred to simply as a tallit or tallis; and tallit katan (everyday undershirt). Through synecdoche, a tallit katan may be referred to as tzitzit.

== Etymology ==
The word may derive from the Hebrew root נ-צ-ה [n-ts-h]. Tzitzit shares this root with the Hebrew for 'lock of hair', or 'dreadlock'. For example, in the Book of Ezekiel an angel grabs the prophet "by the tzitzit of [his] head;" he could be said to be "dragged by his hair."

A popular etymological interpretation of tzitzit derives from another word which shares this root. niṣṣā "budding flower" (נִצָּה) may once have referred to floral ornamentation on clothing. Contemporaneous Akkadian clothing terms exist: sisiktu 'thread', 'edge', 'loom' or ṣiṣṣatu (a floral ornamentation). This hypothesis is supported by the fact that the custom of making fringes from extending the threads of embroidery was common in the ancient Near East as a means of strengthening the fabric. The further analyses of the antique iconography suggest that apart from this pragmatic purpose the tassels could also decorate the cloth and as such be a marker of the social status: the more elaborate and elegant the fringes, the higher the position of the owner. In addition to this, and given the unique nature of each of the tassels, it could also be used as a personal "signet" for sealing documents. This data has led the scholars to assume that the practice itself is of very ancient origins and evolved into Jewish ritual clothing where it was invested with religious meaning.

The ending -it is the feminine adjectival suffix, used here to form a feminine singular noun. In the Hebrew Bible, this noun is used to refer to one or many tassels, but later scholars used the feminine plural ṣiṣiyot. In English-language academic texts, the term is sometimes translated as 'show-fringes'. The Septuagint translation is tassels (Koine Greek: κράσπεδα kráspeda, from singular κράσπεδον kráspedon).

== Torah sources ==
The Hebrew Bible mentions ritual fringes in two places:

Hashem said to Moses as follows: Speak to the sons of Israel and say to them [that they must] make for themselves tzitzit upon the corners of the clothes for generations, and on the tzitzit give a string of techelet. And they shall have for themselves tzitzit and they will see them and they will remember all of the commandments of Hashem and they will do them, and they will not stray after their hearts and eyes so that they shall not pursue after them. So that they will remember and adhere to all of my commandments and will remain holy to their God. I am Hashem your God who took you out of the land of Egypt to be for you a God. I am Hashem your God.

— Numbers 15:37-41, Sefaria Community Translation

You shall make tassels on the four corners of the garment with which you cover yourself.

— Deuteronomy 22:12, Sefaria Community Translation

Since the Hebrew word kanaph can mean 'corner' or 'border', the specific place of the attachment of the fringes is unclear. Their exact number is also not specified. Lastly, the passage lacks any instructions on the binding of the fringes, save for the obligation to include "a cord of blue" (Heb. ptil tchelet). The lack of detail on these points suggests that the tying of tzitzit was to a great extent Oral Torah until the third to first century BCE, with the codifying of the Talmud.

The primary mnemonic purposes of this commandment are expressed clearly: wearing tzitzit reminds a daily practitioner to bring God's love into action by practicing all other commandments. The paragraph from Numbers is included in daily prayer as the final paragraph of the Shema. Here, tzitzit also remind Jews that they are no longer slaves.

== Rabbinic Judaism ==
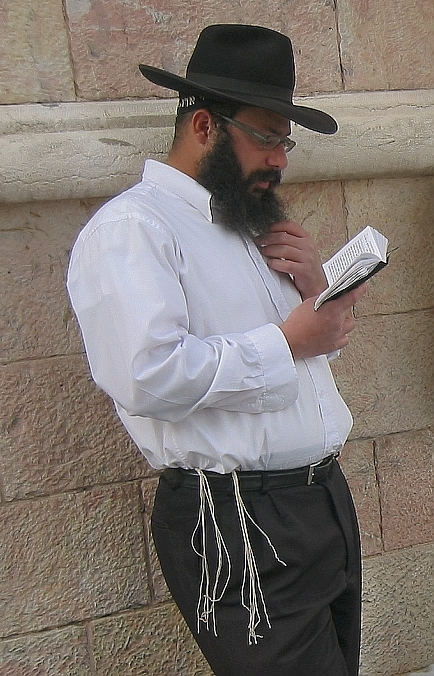
Man wearing tallit katan.

The Talmud equates observance of tzitzit with that of all the 613 commandments. Maimonides includes it as a major commandment along with ritual circumcision and the Passover sacrifice in his Commentary on Pirkei Avot 2:1.

The tallit katan (or arba kanfot) is a four-cornered garment worn by practicing Jews which incorporates four tzitziyot. The tallit katan itself is often referred to as a "tzitzit". A tallit (sometimes distinguished as a tallit gadol "large tallit") is typically worn over the clothes like a cloak, whereas a tallit katan is smaller and worn underneath the clothing. It is a simple garment with a front and back fold, creating four corners to which the tzitzit are fastened. The blue thread mentioned in the Torah, tekhelet, is omitted by most Rabbinic Jews due to controversy over the dye-making process.

=== Fabrics ===
The medieval rabbis debated the source of the tzitzit obligation for garments made from different types of fabric. All agree that garments made from wool or linen (the typical materials of Biblical garments) require tzitzit by Biblical law. However, they debated whether the requirement is Biblical or rabbinic if the garment is made from any other material. The Shulhan Arukh ruled that this obligation is rabbinic, while the Moses Isserles ruled that it is Biblical.

The Torah forbids shatnez ("intertying" wool and linen together). However, unlike other forms of kilʿayim (forbidden mixtures of materials), there is an exception to the rule: shatnez was not only allowed but required in the priestly garments, which combined dyed-wool and linen threads. According to the rabbis, this exemption to shatnez applied only while performing priestly service. Rabbinic Judaism (but not Karaite Judaism or Samaritanism) makes a further exemption to this law for tzitzit, based on the Torah's juxtaposition of the laws for shatnez and tzitzit in Deuteronomy 22:11-12. Thus, according to rabbinic Judaism, both laymen and priests were supposed to wear mixtures of wool and linen all the time. From this perspective, the shatnez of the layman reflects that of the priest.

In practice, the Hazal permitted using wool and linen strings in tandem only when what they hold to be genuine tekhelet is available.

=== Threads and knots ===
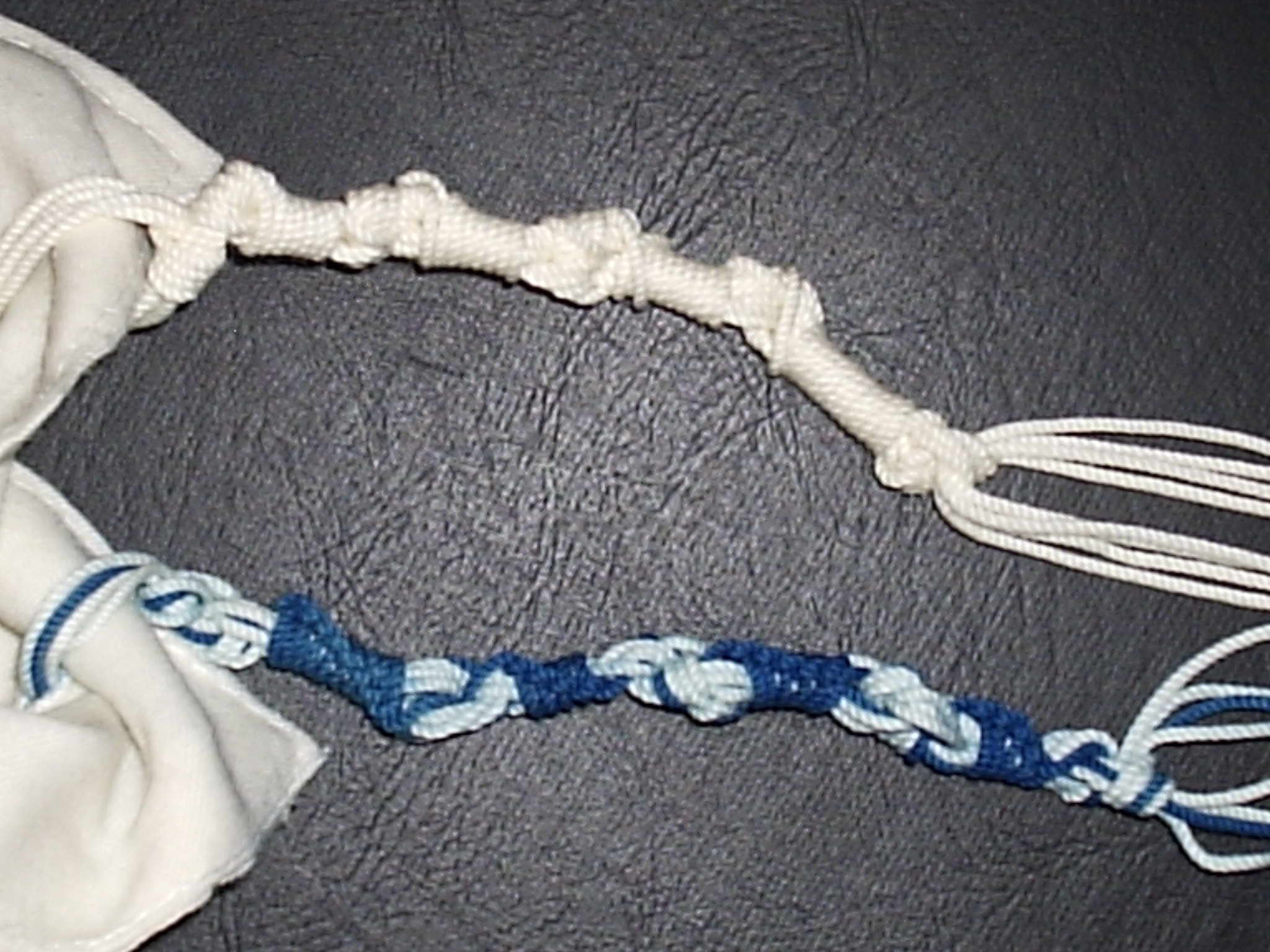
The all-white tzitzit is Ashkenazi. The blue and white tzitzit is knotted according to the Sephardi custom. Note the difference between the 7-8-11-13 scheme and uninterrupted windings (between the knots) on the Ashkenazi, vs. the 10-5-6-5 scheme and ridged winding on the Sephardi tzitzit.

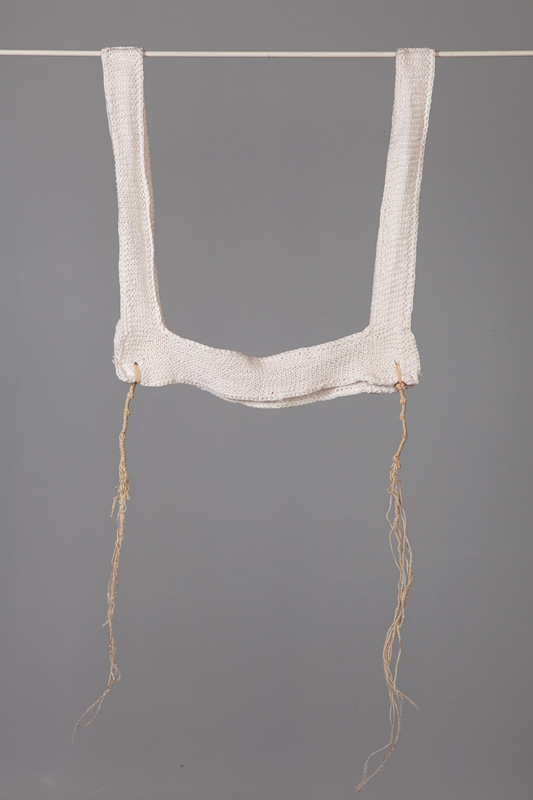
Knitted tallit katan with tzitzit (2 of 4), Basel, 1930s, in the collection of the Jewish Museum of Switzerland.

The tzitzit on each corner is made of four strands, which must be made with intent. These strands are then threaded and hang down, appearing to be eight. (It is customary that each of the four strands is made of eight fine threads, known as kaful shemone). The four strands are passed through a hole (or, according to some, two holes) 1-2 inches (25 to 50 mm) away from the corner of the cloth). There are numerous customs as to how to tie the tassels. The Talmud explains that the Bible requires an upper knot (kesher elyon) and one wrapping of three winds (hulya). The Talmud enjoined that between seven and thirteen hulyot be tied, and that "one must start and end with the color of the garment". As for the making of knots in between the hulyot, the Talmud is inconclusive, and as such, later poskim have interpreted this requirement in various ways. The Talmud described tying assuming the use of tekhelet dye. Following the loss of the source of the dye, various customs of tying were introduced to compensate for the lack of this primary element.

The tying method that gained the widest acceptance can be described as follows. The four strands of the tzitzit are passed through a hole near the garment's corner. The two groups of four ends are double-knotted to each other at the edge of the garment near the hole. One of the four strands (known as the shamash) is made longer than the others. The long end of the shamash is wound around the other seven ends and double-knotted; this is done repeatedly so as to make a total of five double knots separated by four sections of winding, with a total length of at least four inches, leaving free-hanging ends that are twice that long This tying procedure is used for each of the garment's four corners; if it has more than four corners, the four that are farthest apart are used.

In Ashkenazi custom, the four sections of winding number 7-8-11-13 winds, respectively. The total number of winds comes to 39, which is the same number of winds if one were to tie according to the Talmud's instruction of 13 hulyot of 3 winds each. Furthermore, the number 39 is found to be significant in that it is the gematria (numerical equivalent) of the words: "The Lord is One" (Deuteronomy 6:4). Others, especially Sephardic Jews, use 10-5-6-5 as the number of windings, a combination that represents directly the spelling of the Tetragrammaton (whose numerical value is 26).

Before tying begins, a declaration of intent is recited: leShem Mitzvat Tzitzit ('for the sake of the commandment of tzitzit').

=== Interpretations ===
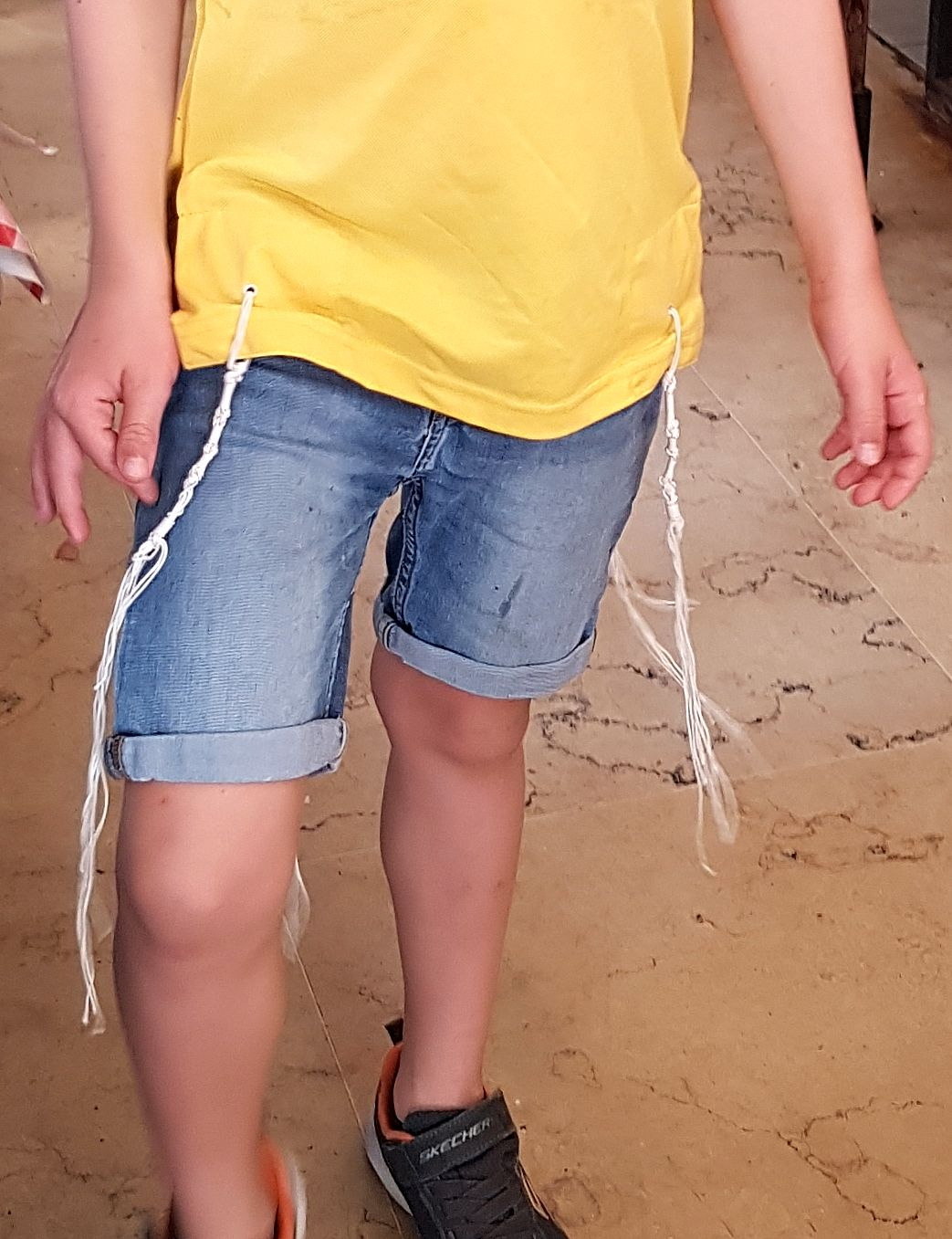
A child's tzitzit attached to school shirt

Rashi, a prominent Jewish commentator, bases the number of knots on a gematria: the word tzitzit (in its Mishnaic spelling, ציצית) has the value 600. Each tassel has eight threads (when doubled over) and five sets of knots, totaling 13. The sum of all numbers is 613, traditionally the number of commandments in the Torah. This reflects the concept that donning a garment with tzitzyot reminds its wearer of all Torah commandments, as specified in Numbers 15:39. (Rashi knots are worn by the majority of Ashkenazic Eastern European Jews.)

Nachmanides disagrees with Rashi, pointing out that the Biblical spelling of the word tzitzit (ציצת) has the gematria of 590 rather than 600, which upends Rashi's proposed gematria. He points out that in the Biblical quote "you shall see it and remember them", the singular form it can refer only to the thread of tekhelet. The tekhelet strand serves this purpose, explains the Talmud, for the blue color of tekhelet resembles the ocean, which in turn resembles the sky, which in turn is said to resemble God's holy throne – thus reminding all of the divine mission to fulfill His commandments. Nachmanides knots are worn by the majority of Sephardic and Temani (Yemenite) Jews.

Modern Biblical scholar Jacob Milgrom notes than in ancient Middle Eastern societies, the corner of the garment was often elaborately decorated to "ma[k]e an important social statement", functioning as a "symbolic extension of the owner himself". He also notes that the Torah requires tekhelet, normally a royal and priestly color, to be used by all Jews: :The tzitzit are the epitome of the democratic thrust within Judaism, which equalizes not by leveling but by elevating. All of Israel is enjoined to become a nation of priests... tzitzit is not restricted to Israel's leaders, be they kings, rabbis or scholars. It is the uniform of all Israel."

Rabbi Leib Mintzberg writes that tzitzit serve as an aesthetic enhancement to clothing, and that the techelet thread is a particularly attractive color. He further suggests that wearing dignified clothing can serve as a reminder of one’s status as a servant of God.

=== Color of the strings ===
==== Tekhelet ====
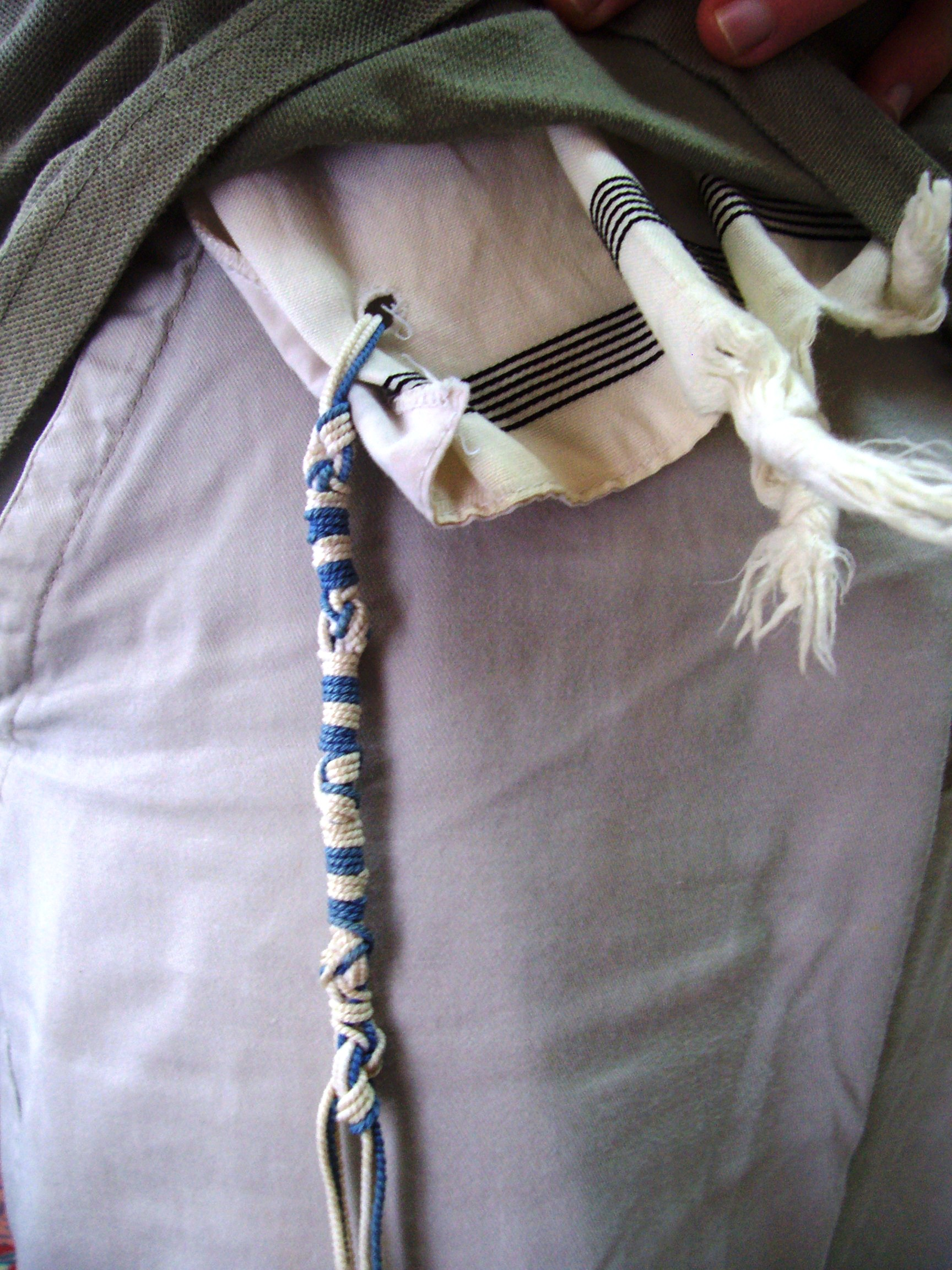
A set of tzitzyot with blue tekhelet thread

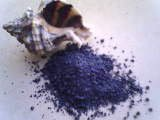
Carthaginian murex pigment from Tunisia

Tekhélet (Biblical Hebrew: תכלת, romanized: təḵēleṯ ) is a dye that the Hebrew Bible commands to use for one, two, or four of the eight half-strings hanging down (as interpreted in Rabbinic Judaism), or a number of cords ranging from one up to the same number of threads as the non-tekhelet threads (according to opinions in Karaite Judaism). At some point following the destruction of the Second Temple, the knowledge and tradition about the correct method of dyeing was lost for Rabbinic Judaism in Israel and since then, most rabbinic diaspora Jews and Israeli Jews as well have worn plain white tzitziyot without any dyes. Tekhelet, which appears 48 times in the Hebrew Bible – translated by the Septuagint as "hyacinthine" (ὑακίνθινος) – is a specific blue-violet dye produced, according to the rabbis, from a creature referred to as a ḥillazon, other blue dyes being unacceptable. Some explain the black stripes found on many traditional prayer shawls as representing the loss of this dye.

While there is no prohibition on wearing blue dye from another source, the rabbis maintain that other kinds of tekhelet do not fulfill the mitzvah of tekhelet, and thus all the strings have been traditionally kept undyed (i.e., white) for many centuries. In recent times, with the (debated) rediscovery of the ḥillazon as the Hexaplex trunculus mollusk, some have noted that one cannot fulfill the mitzvah of tzitzit without the tekhelet strand. This position, however, has been strongly disputed. Others have disputed whether the coloring that comes from the Murex trunculus is the same as the biblical tekhelet, based on the fact that according to traditional Jewish sources tekhelet is supposed to be a dark shade of blue, while wool that was discovered in archaeological excavations and was found to have been colored with Murex dye is violet. Others have also disputed that Murex trunculus might not be the correct chilazon due to its failure in fitting many Rabbinic criteria.

When tekhelet is used, there are varying opinions in rabbinic literature as to how many of the strands are to be dyed: one of eight (Maimonides), two of eight (Abraham ben David), four of eight (Tosafot). While the white threads are to be made of the material of the garment, rabbinic law instructs that the tekhelet-dyed thread must be made of wool.

According to several rabbinic sages, blue is the color of God's Glory. Staring at this color aids in meditation, bringing us a glimpse of the "pavement of sapphire, like the very sky for purity", which is a likeness of the Throne of God. Many items in the Mishkan, the portable sanctuary in the wilderness, such as the Menorah, many of the vessels, and the Ark of the Covenant, were covered with a blue-violet cloth when transported from place to place.

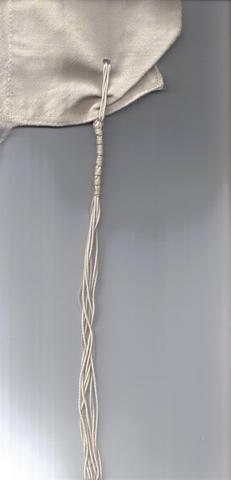
Yemenite tzitzit, based on Maimonides' prescription

==== The other threads ====
The other threads in the tzitzit (all the threads, where tekhelet is not used) are described as "white". This may be interpreted either literally (by Rama) or as meaning the same colour as the main garment (Rambam). Normally, the garment itself is white so that the divergence does not arise. Similarly the threads may be made either of wool or of the same fabric as the garment; again many authorities recommend using a woollen garment so that all views are satisfied.

=== Tzitzit for women ===
In rabbinic law, tzitzit is considered a "time-dependent positive commandment", as the Torah (Numbers 15:39) mentions "seeing" one's tzitzit, and one could not see them in the darkness of night, but rather only in daytime. In general, women are not required to perform time-dependent positive commandments, but may perform them if they choose to. Therefore, many Rishonim explicitly empowered women to wear tzitzit (including Isaac ibn Ghiyyat, Rashi, Rabbeinu Tam, Zerachiah ha-Levi of Girona, Maimonides, Eliezer ben Joel HaLevi, Shlomo ibn Aderet, and Aharon HaLevi). Similarly, the Shulhan Arukh rules that women may wear garments with tzitzit. Opinions differ on whether women may make the blessing on such "optional" commandments; in general, Ashkenazi women make the blessing, and Sephardic women do not.

At the same time, other Rishonim, beginning with Meir of Rothenburg, held that women should not wear tzitzit for various reasons. The Rema states that while women are technically allowed to don a tallit, doing so would appear to be an act of arrogance (yuhara). Yaakov ben Moshe Levi Moelin in the Sefer Maharil 7 and the Targum Pseudo-Jonathan view a garment with tzitzit as a "male garment", and thus forbidden to women as crossdressing. Some other sources mention concern for shatnez or carrying on shabbat.

The vast majority of contemporary Orthodox authorities forbid the donning of a tallit by women, although Moshe Feinstein, Joseph Soloveitchik, and Eliezer Melamed approve women wearing tzitzit in private, if their motivation is "for God's sake" rather than motivated by external movements such as feminism. When Faige Teitelbaum, the Satmar Rebbetzin, died, she was found to be wearing a tallit katan under her clothes.

Women in Conservative Judaism have revived the wearing of the tallit since the 1970s, usually using colors and fabrics distinct from the traditional garment worn by men. The Rabbinical Assembly has since formally approved the wearing and tying of tzitzit by women.

It has become common in non-Orthodox streams for all b’nei mitzvah to receive a tallit at their ceremony, Other women have adopted the tallit later in life, to connect with their communities, embody egalitarian values, or create a personalized connection to Judaism. While 500 years of precedent make it difficult, and sometimes still forbidden, some observant women are beginning to wear a tallit katan.

== Karaite tzitzit ==
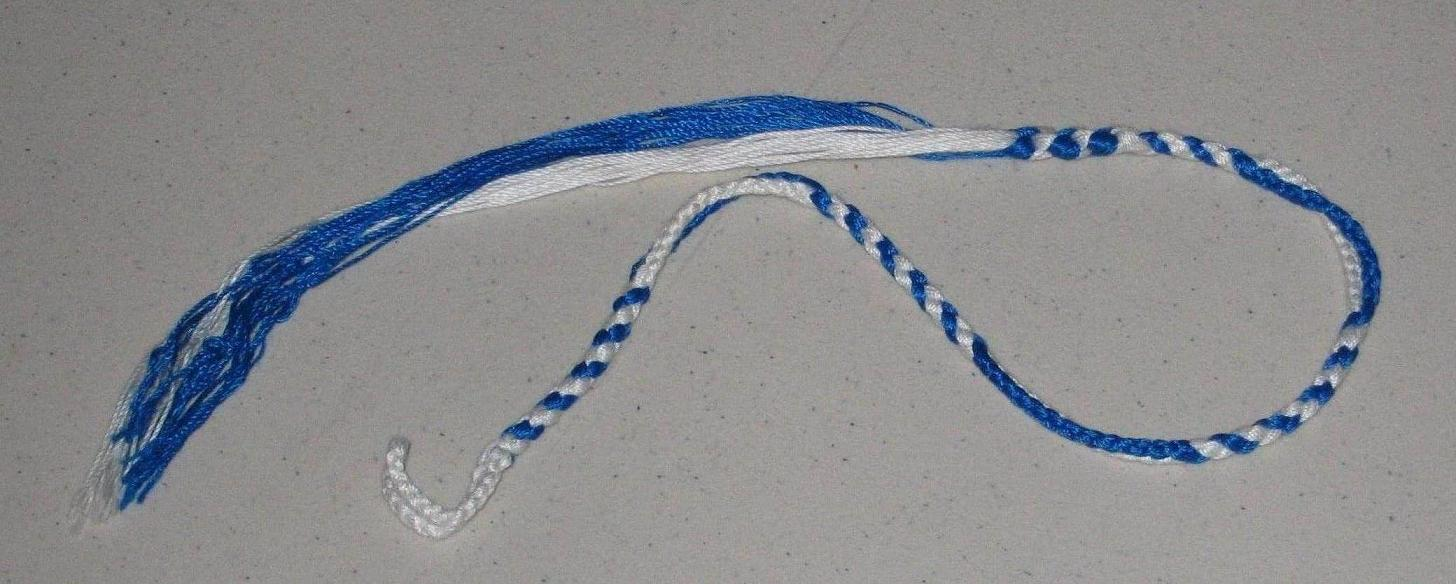
Example of Karaite tzitziyot

Karaite Jews maintain that the tzitziyot must be braided and have the appearance of chains, rather than being knotted as are the tzitziyot of Rabbinic Judaism.

Karaites tzitziyot have blue-violet threads (tekhelet) in them. In contrast to rabbinic Jews, Karaites believe that the tekhelet source can be any dye, except those produced from impure (a definition mostly overlapping "un-kosher") species, such as the molluscs used by Rabbinic Jews. Instead, Karaites propose that the source of the dye was indigo (Indigofera tinctoria) or woad (Isatis tinctoria). Karaites also consider synthetic blue or blue-violet to be acceptable for tekhelet. Contrary to some claims, Karaites do not hang tzitziyot on their walls.

== Samaritan tzitzit ==
In the Samaritan tradition, the tallit is a gown worn over their clothes during most holy days, and the tzitzit are the 22 "buttons" on the right lapel of the gown, and the corresponding loops on its left lapel. The tzitziyot are always in the same color as the gown, which is usually white.

Another version of Samaritan tzitzit is the simple fringes on the sides of the very large white tallit worn by the priests when carrying a Torah scroll.

Similarly to most Orthodox rabbinic Jews, the Samaritans hold that the blue-violet tekhelet thread for their tzitziyot was produced from a specific dye, and claim that the tradition for producing it was lost.

Contrary to some rumors, the Samaritans do not use either rabbinic or Karaite tziziyot.

== In archaeology and secular scholarship ==
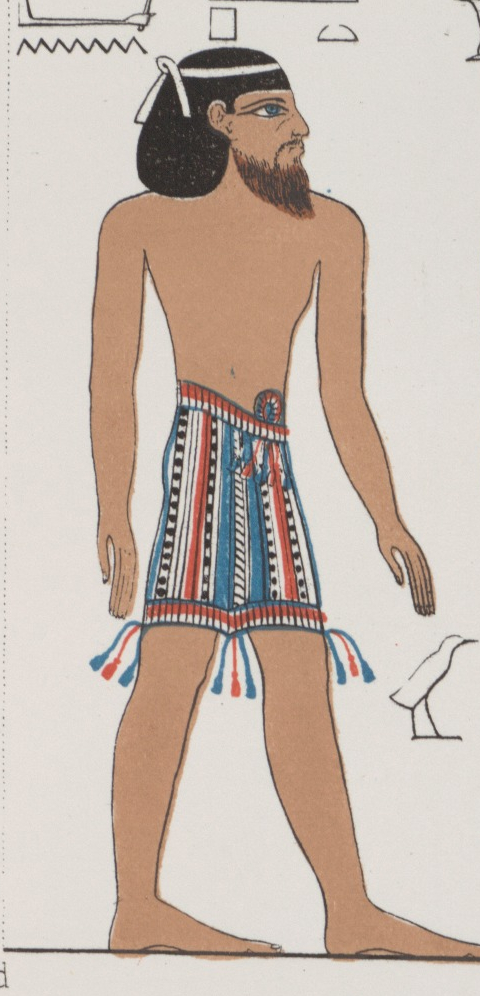
Asiatic (Levantine) man with fringed garment similar to tzitzit (from tomb of Seti I, 13th century BCE)

According to the modern documentary hypothesis, the reference to tzitzit in Numbers comes from the Priestly Code, while that from Deuteronomy comes from the Deuteronomic Code. They are believed to date to around the late 8th century BCE and late 7th century BCE, respectively, some time after the practice became part of regular ritual. However, the custom clearly predates these codes and was not limited to Israelites. Images of the custom have been found on several ancient Near East inscriptions in contexts suggesting that it was practiced across the Near East. While Numbers 15:37-41 uses "tzitzit", Deuteronomy|22:12 employs גְּדִלִים gəḏilim, the plural of an Akkadian loanword for a 'cord' or 'string'. The reason for this lexical change is open to speculation, yet the scholars are inclined to assume that in the times when Deuteronomy was composed, the original meaning of Numbers 15:37 had been lost, and the gəḏilim was a dynamic translation.

== See also ==
- Prayer rope
- Quipu (a form of knot used for record-taking by various cultures in Andes)
