= Deuteronomic Code =

Law code set out in Deuteronomy 12–26

The Deuteronomic Code is the name given by academics to the law code set out in chapters 12 to 26 of the Book of Deuteronomy in the Hebrew Bible. The code outlines a special relationship between the Israelites and Yahweh and provides instructions covering "a variety of topics including religious ceremonies and ritual purity, civil and criminal law, and the conduct of war". They are similar to other collections of laws found in the Torah (the first five books of the Tanakh) such as the Covenant Code at Exodus 20–23, except for the portion discussing the Ethical Decalogue, which is usually treated separately. This separate treatment stems not from any concern over authorship, but merely because the Ethical Decalogue is treated academically as a subject in its own right.

Almost the entirety of Deuteronomy is presented as the last few speeches of Moses, beginning with an historical introduction as well as a second introduction which expands on the Ethical Decalogue, and ending with hortatory speeches and final words of encouragement. Between these is found the law code, at Deuteronomy 12–26. In critical scholarship, this portion, as well as the majority of the remainder of Deuteronomy, was written by the Deuteronomist.

== Dating ==
It is difficult to date the laws found in the Deuteronomic Code. There are many laws unique to Deuteronomy, such as the prohibition of sacrifice outside "the place that the Lᴏʀᴅ your God will choose" (Deuteronomy 12:5) and having a national Passover sacrifice in a national shrine (Deuteronomy 16:1–8). In contrast, other books in the Pentateuch refer to altars throughout Israel without condemnation. Both of these laws were observed for the first time under King Josiah, giving credence to the theory that Deuteronomy was written around that time. Many of the other laws can be found elsewhere in the Torah, and it is likely the Deuteronomistic author(s) were influenced by such laws. Biblical scholar Michael Coogan notes two examples, the Covenant Code and the Ritual Decalogue found in Exodus 20:22–23:33 and Exodus 34 respectively.

It is remarkable that Amos (c. 760 BCE), Hosea (c. 750 BCE), and the undisputed portions of Isaiah (Isaiah 1–39 ["First Isaiah"], c. 700 bce) show no certain traces of any influence from the Deuteronomic Code, or its style, while Jeremiah exhibits marks of these things on nearly every page, especially in his prose. The prophetic teachings, the leading theological ideas, and the principles which the author seeks to inculcate, exhibit many points of contact with that of Jeremiah and Ezekiel, and especially with the characteristic principles of the compiler of the Book of Kings, who must have lived after the events described in that Book, or during the later ones. If the code had been composed between Isaiah and Jeremiah, these facts would be exactly accounted for.

It is for these reasons that the unanimous opinion of modern biblical criticism is that Deuteronomy is not the work of Moses, as is the traditionally held opinion, but that it was, in its main parts, written in the seventh century B.C., during the reign of Josiah. It is not difficult to realize the significance which the book must have had if it were written at this time. It would have formed a great protest against the prevalent tendencies of the age, a century, as Jeremiah readily testifies, in which religious viewpoints, other than that of centralised worship of Yahweh, were making serious encroachments in the Kingdom of Judah, associated with its decline. The Deuteronomic Code thus may be described as the prophetic reformulation and adaptation to new needs of an older legislation, essentially the work not of a jurist or statesman, but of a prophet.

Traditionalists generally maintain that the Deuteronomic Code was, indeed, the work of Moses. As regards the contention that the earlier books do not emphasize the centrality of the Temple worship in Jerusalem, those books primarily discuss the service in the desert Tabernacle. Nevertheless, Leviticus 17 clearly mandates a centralized venue of sacrifice. The similarity to the works of Jeremiah appears to be a result of the renewed interest in Deuteronomy during the reign of King Josiah, but with Jeremiah borrowing from the conventions of Deuteronomy—not the other way around.

== Characteristics ==
It is characteristic of the discourses of the Deuteronomic Code that the writer's aim is throughout parenetic, making passing allusions to history, for example at Deuteronomy 13:4–5, and 24:9, for the sake of the lessons that the writer believes deducible from it. In the treatment of the laws, they are not merely collected, or a series of legal enactments repeated, but developed with reference to the moral and religious purposes which they can subserve, and to the motives from which it is perceived that the Israelite is ought to obey them.

The Deuteronomic Code reflects particular social concerns, more specifically in dealing with the poor and underprivileged. The Deuteronomic Code places special emphasis on the lower class and marginalized. For example, women and children, widows, foreigners and the poor. Deuteronomy 15:12–15 illustrates one example in which a former slave is to receive gifts. The law code seems methodically to provide legal compensation for those who are victimised by the inequities and brutalities that may otherwise inhere in the social system. Duties involving directly the application of a moral principle are especially insisted on, particularly justice, integrity, equity, philanthropy, and generosity; for example insisting on strict impartiality and judges being appointed in every city, as well as insisting that fathers are not to be condemned judicially for the sins of their children, nor vice versa, in stark contrast to some other passages. Nevertheless, despite this general philanthropic nature, breaches of the moral code are punished severely: death is the penalty not only for murder, but also for unchastity, and even for disrespectful behaviour by a son.

The style of the Deuteronomic discourses is very marked, being particularly distinct when compared with the style of the rest of the Torah. Not only do particular words and expressions, embodying often the writer's characteristic thoughts, recur with remarkable frequency, giving a distinctive colouring to every part of his work, but the long and rolling clauses in which the author expresses himself are a new feature in Hebrew literature. Nowhere else in the Old Testament does there breathe such an atmosphere of generous devotion or of benevolence, neither is there such strong eloquence when duties are elsewhere set forth.

== Comparison to other Torah law codes ==
According to textual criticism, Deuteronomy is only remotely related to the Priestly Code and there are certainly no verbal parallels. Some of the institutions and observances codified in the Priestly Code are indeed mentioned, mainly burnt-offerings, peace offerings, heave-offerings, the distinction between "clean" and "unclean", and rules about leprosy. However, they are destitute of the central significance with which they are placed in the Priestly Code.

Conversely, the distinction between priests and other Levites, the Levite cities, the jubilee year, the offering of cereal crops, sin offerings, and Yom Kippur, which are fundamental institutions in the Priestly code, are not mentioned at all in the Deuteronomic Code. In the laws which do touch common ground, there are frequently large discrepancies, which in some cases are regarded irreconcilable by critical scholarship. In the documentary hypothesis, this large variation is explained, by the Code being identified as the work of a group of priests, centred at Shiloh, who were rival to the Aaronid group to whom the Priestly Code is assigned.

Unlike the Priestly Code, with the laws contained in the Holiness Code, the Deuteronomic Code has some parallels, chiefly moral injunctions. Nevertheless, although in such cases the substance is often similar, the expression is nearly always different, for example the commandment concerning mourning at Deuteronomy 14:1 reflects Leviticus 19:28, and likewise the commandments of mixing kinds, at Leviticus 19:15 is reflected at Deuteronomy 16:19–20, but both occur in quite different phrasing. Thus it can not be said that the legislation of Deuteronomy is in any sense an expansion or development of the Holiness Code itself, although the underlying laws appear to have a greater affinity.

As far as critical scholarship is concerned, the Covenant Code, and the Ritual Decalogue which partially repeats it, can be seen to form the foundation of the Deuteronomic legislation. This is evident partly from the numerous verbal coincidences, whole clauses, and sometimes even an entire law, being repeated verbatim, and partly from the fact that frequently a law in Deuteronomy consists of an expansion, or application to particular cases, of a principle laid down more briefly in the Covenant Code or Ritual Decalogue. This can, for example, be seen in Deuteronomy 16:1–17, concerning the three annual feasts, which are described very basically in the Covenant Code, at Exodus 23:14–17. The civil and social enactments which are new to Deuteronomy make provision chiefly for cases likely to arise in a more highly organised community than is contemplated in the legislation of the Covenant Code, and therefore critical scholarship regards the Deuteronomic Code as a development of the Covenant Code reflecting the increased organisation of society in the time between the two.

Repeatedly and pointedly the older laws of the Covenant Code are restated in Deuteronomy in terms which inescapably suggest the influence of Amos, Hosea and Isaiah. The difference between the two codes may be summarised as further tempering law on behalf of the offender, and providing a still more merciful view with respect to the weak, and powerless. It is a matter of dispute whether the author knew the Covenant Code and Ritual Decalogue as separate works, or after they had been united into JE, as rather than copying, the laws of the Deuteronomic Code are variously free modification or enlargement of them. Consequently, amongst critical scholarship, some think it to be simply an enlarged edition of the old code, whereas others feel it to have been intended as a replacement.

In the Deuteronomic Code, it is strictly laid down that sacrifice is to be offered at a single central sanctuary. However, in the Tanakh, from the Book of Joshua to the Books of Kings (I Kings 6), sacrifices are frequently described as offered in various parts of the land, without any suggestion, by either the characters present in the narrative, or the narrator themselves, that any law, such as that of Deuteronomy, is being broken. Other laws appear to more specifically point to a terminus post quem, after which the code must have been composed. The law concerning the king, and the prohibitions against acquiring "many horses", "many wives", and "silver and gold... in great quantity", at Deuteronomy 17:14–20, appears to be coloured by reminiscences of Solomon (c. 950 BCE), and the forms of idolatry referred to, especially worship of "any of the host of heaven", as described at Deuteronomy 17:3, appear to refer to behaviour during the reign of Ahaz (c. 730 BCE).

The Deuteronomic Code is composed of several mitzvot or commandments, approximately one third of the mitzvot in the Torah, and is therefore a major constituent of Jewish Law. While several of the laws are repetitions of those present elsewhere in the Torah, many have notable variations, and there are additionally many further laws which are unique to the code.

=== Laws similar to those elsewhere in the Torah ===
Laws of religious observance

- Against worshipping other gods and committing human sacrifice, at Deuteronomy 12:29–31
- Prohibiting deliberate disfigurement as an act of mourning, at Deuteronomy 14:1–2
- Concerning clean and unclean animals, at Deuteronomy 14:3–20
- Prohibiting the consumption of animals who have not been killed by mankind, at Deuteronomy 14:21
- Against Asherah groves and ritual pillars, at Deuteronomy 12:3, 16:21–22
- Against blemished sacrifices, at Deuteronomy 17:1

Laws concerning officials

- Ordering impartiality of judges, at Deuteronomy 16:19–20

Criminal law

- Concerning witnesses, at Deuteronomy 19:15–21
- Concerning adultery and seduction, at Deuteronomy 22:22–29
- Against kidnap, at Deuteronomy 24:7
- Ordering just weights and measures, at Deuteronomy 25:13–16

Civil law

- Ordering the restoration of lost property once found, at Deuteronomy 22:1–4
- Prohibition of mixing kinds, at Deuteronomy 22:9–11
- Concerning tzitzit, at Deuteronomy 22:12
- Against marrying a step-mother, at Deuteronomy 22:30
- Against usury, at Deuteronomy 23:19–20
- Concerning vows, at Deuteronomy 23:21–23
- Concerning pledges, at Deuteronomy 24:6, 24:10–13
- Concerning leprosy, at Deuteronomy 24:8–9
- Concerning the wages of a hired servant, at Deuteronomy 24:14–15
- Ordering justice towards strangers, widows, and orphans, at Deuteronomy 24:17–18
- Concerning the scraps of crops, at Deuteronomy 24:19–22

=== Laws differing from those elsewhere in the Torah ===
Laws of religious observance

- Prohibiting offerings and vows outside a single central sanctuary, at Deuteronomy 12:1–28
- Concerning the tithe, at Deuteronomy 14:22–29
- Concerning relief of debt in the seventh year, at Deuteronomy 15:1–11
- Ordering the offering to Yahweh of the firstborn males, at Deuteronomy 15:19–23
- Concerning the three annual feasts, at Deuteronomy 16:1–17

Criminal law

- Concerning manslaughter and murder, at Deuteronomy 19:1–13

Civil laws

- Concerning slavery, at Deuteronomy 15:12–18
- Concerning cleanliness in the camp, at Deuteronomy 23:9–14

=== Laws unique, within the Torah ===
Laws of religious observance

- Against false prophets, at Deuteronomy 13
- Ordering idolaters to be stoned to death, at Deuteronomy 17:2–7

Laws concerning officials

- Ordering judges to be appointed in every city, at Deuteronomy 16:18
- Ordering there to be a supreme central tribunal, at Deuteronomy 17:8–13
- Restrictions on the king, at Deuteronomy 17:14–20
- Concerning the rights, and revenue, of the Levites, at Deuteronomy 18:1–8
- Concerning the future (unspecified) prophet, at Deuteronomy 18:9–22
- Restrictions on admittance to the priesthood, at Deuteronomy 23:1–8

Military law

- Concerning behaviour during war, at Deuteronomy 20, 21:10–14

Criminal law

- Ordering a ritual atonement by the people for untraced murder, at Deuteronomy 21:1–9
- Concerning the corpse of a criminal, at Deuteronomy 21:22–23

Civil laws

- Against the removal of boundary markers, at Deuteronomy 19:14
- Concerning primogeniture, at Deuteronomy 21:15–17
- Ordering undutiful sons to be stoned to death, at Deuteronomy 21:18–21
- Against crossdressing, at Deuteronomy 22:5
- Prohibiting taking a mother bird at the same time as its nest, at Deuteronomy 22:6–7
- Ordering roofs to be constructed with parapets, at Deuteronomy 22:8
- Prohibiting newly married women from being slandered, at Deuteronomy 22:13–21
- Concerning escaped slaves, at Deuteronomy 23:15–16
- Against religious prostitution, at Deuteronomy 23:17–18
- Concerning the crops of a neighbour, at Deuteronomy 23:24–25
- Concerning divorce, at Deuteronomy 24:1–4
- Against punishing the family of a criminal, at Deuteronomy 24:16
- Limiting the number of lashes, at Deuteronomy 25:1–3
- Against muzzling oxen during threshing, at Deuteronomy 25:4
- Concerning levirate marriage, at Deuteronomy 25:5–10
- Ordering women to be modest, at Deuteronomy 25:11–12

Ritual

- The ritual of the firstfruits and of the tithe, including a prayer, at Deuteronomy 26:1–15
