= The Eleventh Commandment =

The Eleventh Commandment may refer to:

== Aphorisms ==
- The Eleventh Commandment (Ronald Reagan): "Thou shalt not speak ill of any fellow Republican."
- "The Eleventh Commandment", a statement by soil conservationist Walter C. Lowdermilk
- "The Eleventh Commandment", a recurring segment in the radio show The Catholic Guy
- A mythical secret rule that is presumed to be known by others, e.g. "Remember the eleventh commandment: 'Don't get caught'." or "We can't be punished! That violates the eleventh commandment: 'The rich don't go to jail'." etc.
- "Thou Shall Not Litter", featured by Terry A. Davis in his TempleOS project

== Film, theatre and television ==
- The Eleventh Commandment (play), a 1921 play by Brandon Fleming
- The Eleventh Commandment (film), various films
- "The Eleventh Commandment", an episode in series six of Holby City
- The Eleventh Commandment, a 1986 play by David Schneider

== Literature ==
- The Eleventh Commandment, a 1962 novel by Lester del Rey
- The Eleventh Commandment, the 1976 autobiography of British playwright Jimmy O'Connor
- The Eleventh Commandment, a 1990 novel by Andreas Schroeder
- The Eleventh Commandment (novel), a 1998 novel by Jeffrey Archer

== Music ==
- "The Eleventh Commandment", a song and music video from Collin Raye's 1998 album The Walls Came Down
- "Eleventh Commandment", an instrumental song by Ben Harper and The Blind Boys of Alabama from the gospel album There Will Be a Light released in 2004

== See also ==
- Ten Commandments (disambiguation)
- 613 Commandments
