= Priestly Code =

Jewish body of laws

The Priestly Code (in Hebrew Torat Kohanim, תורת כהנים) is the name given, by academia, to the body of laws expressed in the Torah which do not form part of the Holiness Code, the Covenant Code, the Ritual Decalogue, the Ethical Decalogue or the Deuteronomic Code. The Priestly Code constitutes the majority of Leviticus, as well as some of the laws expressed in Numbers. The code forms a large portion, approximately one third, of the commandments of the Torah, and thus is a major source of Jewish law.

It is termed the Priestly Code due to its large concern with ritual and the Jewish priesthood, and also, in critical scholarship, it is defined as the whole of the law code believed to be present in the Priestly Source except for the Holiness Code. Under the documentary hypothesis, while some scholars believe that the Priestly Code was created to rival the Ethical Decalogue and Covenant Code, others believe was intended as only supplementary to the Holiness Code.

== Constituent parts ==
Although the majority of the code forms the bulk of Leviticus, there are several laws which appear in other places in the Torah. The code is generally regarded to contain the following laws:

- Law of circumcision (Genesis 17)
- Laws concerning consumption of the Passover meal (Exodus 12:43-49)
- Laws concerning the keeping of the Sabbath (Exodus 31:14b-17 and 35:1-3)
- Law concerning the consumption of dead animals, fat, blood, and the portion due to the priest (Leviticus 7:22-38)
- Law concerning inappropriate behaviour for priests (Leviticus 10:6-15)
- List of clean and unclean animals (Leviticus 11)
- Laws of purification and atonement (Leviticus 12, Leviticus 13, and Leviticus 15)
- Laws interpreting the Holiness Code:
  - The prohibition against consuming the naturally dead (Leviticus 17:15-16)
  - The order to make trespass offerings after sexual involvement with an engaged slavewoman (Leviticus 19:21-22)
  - The prohibition against an anointed high priest uncovering his head or rending his clothes (Leviticus 21:10)
  - The prohibition against offerings by Aaronid priests who are blemished (Leviticus 21:21-22)
  - Case law concerning a blasphemer (Leviticus 24:10-15a and 24:23)
  - The order for a trumpet sounding on Yom Kippur (Leviticus 25:9b)
  - Rules concerning redeeming property (Leviticus 25:23 and 25:26-34)
  - Order to only keep heathens as slaves (Leviticus 25:40, 25:42, 25:44-46)
  - Rules concerning redeeming people (Leviticus 25:48-52, and 25:54)
- Law concerning the commutation of vows (Leviticus 27)
- Miscellaneous laws concerning lepers, and dedicated things (Numbers 5:1-10)
- Law concerning women suspected of adultery (Numbers 5:11-31)
- Law of the "Little Passover" (Numbers 9:9-14)
- Laws concerning the duties and revenue of priests and Levites (Numbers 18)
- Law concerning the daughters of Zelophehad and inheritance (Numbers 27:1-11)
- Law concerning oaths (Numbers 30)
- The giving of 48 cities to the Levits (Numbers 35:1-8)
- Law on the treatment of murder and manslaughter (Numbers 35:9-34)
- Law concerning the daughters of Zelophehad and marriage to a land owner (Numbers 36)

It is also generally regarded as containing the following descriptions and rules of ritual:

- Ritual of Passover and the Feast of Unleavened Bread (Exodus 12:15-20)
- Ritual of Consecration of Priests (Exodus 29:1-37, carried out at Leviticus 8)
- Continual morning and evening offerings (Exodus 29:38-42)
- Rules concerning the burning of incense and of hand washing (Exodus 30:7-10, and 30:19-20)
- Rules about the composition of anointing oil and incense (Exodus 30:22-38)
- Rules of burnt offerings, meal offerings, peace offerings, sin offerings, and guilt offerings, including specifications of the portions allocated to priests, and, in some cases, the appropriate costume of the officiating priest (Leviticus 1-7:21, carried out at Leviticus 9)
- Ritual of cleansing lepers (Leviticus 14)
- Rule of fringes (Leviticus 15:37-41)
- Ritual of Yom Kippur (Leviticus 16:3-34, 25:9b)
- Rituals interpreting the Holiness Code:
  - The order to keep the sabbath, passover, and feast of unleavened bread (Leviticus 23:1-10a)
  - The order to keep Yom Kippur, and Sukkot (Leviticus 23:23-38)
  - The order for continual bread and oil (Leviticus 24:1-9)
- Ritual concerning Nazarites (Numbers 6:1-21)
- The priestly benediction (Numbers 6:22-27)

The LORD bless thee, and keep thee:
The LORD make his face shine upon thee, and be gracious unto thee:
The LORD lift up his countenance upon thee, and give thee peace.

- Rules concerning how to fix lamps on the golden candlestick, and how to consecrate priests (Numbers 8:1-15, carried out at Numbers 8:20-22)
- Ritual of the Red Heifer, for purification after contact with a corpse (Numbers 19)

== Biblical context ==
The majority of the Priestly Code is presented in the Torah as the Law which is given to Moses directly by God at Mount Sinai. Unlike the Decalogues, however, Yahweh speaks the laws to Moses while descended, in a cloud, upon the Tabernacle which the Israelites have constructed. The remainder is present as scattered laws either given by Moses directly, or by being given in a similar manner to the majority, via the tabernacle, but after the Israelites have moved elsewhere, taking the tabernacle with them. The implication, therefore, is that the tabernacle is the place where God speaks with the priesthood.

== Composition ==
It is evident that rules of priestly procedure must have accompanied the institution of the priesthood, and in the earliest of times, before writing was invented, these rules probably were transmitted orally. When writing was first employed in connection with them, it is likely that only some general directions, or some details deemed most important, were committed to writing. As time passed on the importance given to written law would lead the priesthood to commit more and more of the details to writing. Critical scholars assert that in addition to this, over time, variations of detail would develop, authority for which must be committed to writing, so that actual practise would become justified by law. One would, therefore, suppose beforehand that such a code would exhibit evidence of gradual growth.

Colophons, which, according to textual criticism, are best explained as survivals from previous collections, are found in parts of the priestly code, at Leviticus 6:7, 7:37-38, 11:46-47, 13:59; 14:54-57, and 15:32-33. Colophons generally occur at the end of sources, and it is for this reason that Biblical Critics assert that the priestly code is composed of several originally separate documents placed together, with these colophons marking the ends of some of the source texts. Aside from these colophons, and obvious breaks between laws, such as those caused by narrative elements, for example the break between Leviticus 7:31 and Leviticus 11:1, as well as those caused by the presence of the Holiness Code, it is more difficult to identify other potential borders between sources.

One observation that can be made is that after each colophon, in Leviticus, there is a new introduction, of the form and the LORD said unto Moses.... Several critical scholars have proposed that these introductions are an attempt to patch over the breaks between sources, and therefore conclude that everywhere there is a new introduction, there must be a break between sources. In addition to the colophons, and narrative breaks, this adds additional borders at Leviticus 4:1, 5:14, 6:1, 6:19, 6:24, 7:22, 7:28, 13:1, 14:33, and 15:1.

More detailed textual criticism, comparing vocabulary, writing styles, and so forth, is seen, by critical scholars, to support the idea that both the colophons, and the introductions, mark the borders between works originating from different writers, except for Leviticus 6:1. Leviticus 5:15-19 and 6:2-18 are usually regarded, under textual criticism, to have been from a continuous work, due to identical writing style, such as a ram without blemish out of the flock, with thy estimation ..., and trespass (ed) against the LORD. Nevertheless, such textual criticism also identifies further abrupt changes in style, between Leviticus 1 and 2, between Leviticus 2 and 3, and between Leviticus 4 and 5.

There is also an additional, abrupt change at Leviticus 13:47, between discussion of leprosy, and of leprosy of clothing (mildew), only presenting part of a sentence, devoid of any verb clause — [...] without the camp shall his habitation be. The garment also that the plague of leprosy is in, whether it be [list of types of garment]. And if the plague be greenish or reddish in the garment [...]. Thus, taking this as another border, in critical scholarship, Leviticus 13:1-46 represents a distinct text to Leviticus 13:47-59. This latter text, discussing mildew, noticeably appears to interrupt Leviticus 13:1-14:32, discussing leprosy, since prior to it is a law ordering that a leper be sent out of the camp to dwell alone, and after the mildew section is a law instructing priests to go out of the camp and inspect the leper to see if they are yet healed. Consequently, Leviticus 13:1-46 and 14:2-32 are viewed as one, original, text into which the mildew section was inserted at a later date.

Another section of the priestly code which is considered, by critical scholars, to interlace two earlier sources, is Leviticus 16. The ritual of the two goats, one being a scapegoat sent to Azazel, as a ritual to atone for sin as a nation, is given before, rather than within, instructions laying out how to observe Yom Kippur, leading to arguments that there were originally two separate sources describing this event. Further study on this question lead to the suggestion, supported by a majority of critical scholars, that there were two originally separate rituals which have been intertwined, one involving the two goats, at Leviticus 16:5, 16:7-10, and 16:14-28, and the other involving bullocks, constituting the remainder of Leviticus 16.

Textual criticism also produces a noteworthy observation concerning Leviticus 12. This brief chapter concerns the ritual of purification after childbirth, which is strikingly similar to the rituals for purification after menstruation, and other bodily discharges (bleeding, pus, vomit, etc.), at the end of Leviticus 15. Both, for example, involve two turtledoves, or two young pigeons brought to a priest, one for a sin offering and the other for a burnt offering, on the eighth day. According to textual criticism, the writing style, vocabulary, and so forth, is also indicative of a single author for the two chapters. Consequently, most biblical critics view Leviticus 12 as originally belonging immediately after Leviticus 15:30, as Leviticus 15 has the structure of discussion on male non-sexual discharges, followed by discussion on male sexual discharges (semen), followed by discussion on female non-sexual discharges, and thus Leviticus 12 completes the pattern, as it discusses childbirth, which can be viewed as sexually connected (conception) discharge (of a baby) by a female. Although there is not complete agreement about why this Chapter was moved, the currently most prominent reason given is that, at a later point in time, the view of childbirth changed, and it was no longer viewed as a sexual discharge.

== Modifications ==
According to critical scholarship, the entire Priestly Code is a later addition, within the Priestly Source, to the earlier Holiness Code. However, textual criticism indicates it as having several different authors, some of whom appear, according to textual critics, not only to have added laws, but to have added modifications onto earlier ones within the Code.

=== Progression to naturalism ===
Some of the ritual laws, or at least portions of these laws, involve two similar animals being brought to the priest, one being killed in a certain manner, and its blood sprinkled onto the sinner, the other being sent away. Such rituals involve the idea that sin can be transferred, from the sinner to the living animal, via the blood of its dead associate. These are generally considered to be amongst the oldest layer of laws, since they invoke extended supernatural ideas, rather than simply involving belief in a god.

Other ritual laws also involve an animal being sacrificed, and its blood again being passed onto the sinner, but this time as a symbol that the sinner has paid for their sin, and is now forgiven their sin. These laws involve the idea that sin is something to be atoned for rather than taken away. In anthropology generally, as well as in biblical criticism, this is viewed as a later development, replacing conceptions of the supernatural with simply being fined for the sin. Nevertheless, these laws are still viewed as indicating gradual progression from the earlier layer, since they still show a remnant of the earlier ritual, the blood still being sprinkled on the sinner.

Modification of this kind is thought to be evident in the law concerning leprosy; Leviticus 14:10-20 is regarded by critical scholarship as a later substitute for the ritual of Leviticus 14:2-8. There is also thought to be a different addition into this law, namely Leviticus 13:46b, and Leviticus 14:8b, adding the clause expelling lepers from society, backed up by an addition to the narrative giving a very thin account of Moses carrying out such expulsion. It is generally considered, in critical scholarship, that this change is due to an increasing strictness concerning hygiene, evident also in the additions thought present in laws such as that concerning clean and unclean animals.

Likewise, the ritual of the Red Heifer at Numbers 9:1-13, in which water of cleansing is produced, is generally thought by academic criticism to be early. The idea of this liquid, with which to wash away ritual uncleanliness, is thus thought to have become superseded by the more naturalistic idea that such uncleanliness merely needs to be atoned for, by a sacrificial offering, an idea represented elsewhere.

This change from more supernatural ideas methods to naturalistic ones is present also in aspects of law other than completely sacrificial rituals. Numbers 5:12-31 presents the law concerning the treatment of a suspicion of adultery, and is believed, in critical scholarship, to contain two versions of the law. These two versions are thought to be intricately woven together, but nevertheless the general content of the rituals are still thought able to be separated. One version is considered to only involve a jealousy offering, of barley, being placed in the woman's hands, and then waved by the priest, with a handful being subsequently burnt, the other version involving the woman drinking cursed water. The version involving the less naturalistic idea of a curse making a woman's thigh rot is thought to represent the earlier law, which subsequently evolved into the other version more concerned with atoning.

=== Increasing precision ===
Leviticus 11, discussing clean and unclean animals, mentions carcasses at Leviticus 11:8, and then lists which animals are unclean, appearing to end the list at Leviticus 11:23. Leviticus 11:24-31 expands on the subject of carcasses, and then mentions several other animals which are unclean. Since both of these features are expansions, and appear out of place, rather than the details concerning carcasses being mentioned after Leviticus 11:8, and the additional animals being part of the list, it is generally considered amongst textual critics that Leviticus 11:24-31 is a later addition to the chapter, added in order to make it more precise. Leviticus 11:32-38 also is regarded as appearing out of place, since it returns to the subject of carcasses, the subject having previously moved away. This segment offers even more precision, detailing the uncleanliness of objects which have made contact with carcasses, and is thus usually thought of, by critical scholars, as an even later addition than Leviticus 11:24-31.

Leviticus 4 is of this vein, extending the laws of the "sin-offering" to specify the penalty for each level of sin. Additionally, the ritual for the offering itself is more elaborate than that described elsewhere, for example at Leviticus 9:8-11, and utilizes a bullock, rather than the goat that is required according to Leviticus 9:15, 16:8, and Numbers 15:24. Critical scholars, therefore, regard this chapter as being a much later addition to the sin-offering laws.

Different stages of precision are also thought evident in Numbers 8. Numbers 8:15b-26 repeats the rules of Numbers 8:6-15a, but also connects the ownership of the firstborn with the Exodus from Egypt, as well as adding rules concerning a minimum age and a retirement age. Standard textual criticism, as well as the repetition, is thought to indicate that the second portion is by a different writer, creating an explanation that was not originally present.

Such increasing of precision is not only present in direct modification of the law, and there are examples of instances where narrative frameworks present modifications of the law, but openly admitting that they are extra rules, not present when the laws were originally given out. For example, the law of the little passover in Numbers 9:9-14 adds rules concerning how people who have become unclean can manage to carry out the passover rules of Exodus 12:1-20. In a similar manner, the case law example, involving the daughters of Zelophehad, at Numbers 27:1-11, is returned to at Numbers 36, conveniently providing a framework to express a quite different law.

=== Weakening ===
There are also examples of clauses which appear to water down preceding laws. Leviticus 14:21-32 provides for the substitution of two turtledoves (or pigeons) for a lamb, reducing the cost to the provider of the sacrifice. While this is presented as being a response for poor sinners, critical scholarship interprets the section as indicating that, historically, an earlier sacrificial offering, of a lamb, was increasingly being replaced, over time, by a pair of turtledoves.

Modification of this kind is also thought to be found twice in succession within Leviticus 5:1-13. A sacrifice involving a lamb or kid (of a goat) is described at Leviticus 5:1-6, whereas Leviticus 5:7-10 states that two turtledoves or two pigeons suffice, whereas Leviticus 5:11-13 further states that mere flour is sufficient. Biblical critics assert that it is difficult to see why anyone would go to the extent of bringing a lamb, when flour is enough, and similarly, if flour is sufficient, they assert that mentioning more costly losses, such as lambs, would be unexpected from a single writer of the law. Textual criticism identifies quite different writing styles between each of these three sections, the first section not detailing any ritual whatsoever, merely what should be brought, the second giving quite detailed instructions of ritual, and each being progressively more verbose, the first merely writes shall make an atonement for him concerning his sin, whereas the third produces shall make an atonement for him as touching his sin that he hath sinned in one of these. For these reasons, critical scholars usually identify Leviticus 5:7-10 as a later addition to Leviticus 5:1-6, and Leviticus 5:11-13 as an even later addition, reflecting the ritual gradually being watered down over time.

== Provenance ==
Despite the disparate nature of the Priestly Code, it is nevertheless believed possible to identify a few authors who have worked on more than one of the laws. The most noticeable of these is an author who writes, unlike the remainder, in the style of a teacher, and is consequently sometimes referred to, in critical scholarship, as the priestly teacher (Pt). The laws typically ascribed to this supposed author are either started by a phrase such as this is the law of..., as is the case, for example, with Numbers 19:14-22; or end with a colophon of the form this is the law of [subject A], [summary of the law concerning subject A], [subject B], [summary of the law concerning subject B], ..., as is the case with Numbers 6:1-21, and the more naturalistic parts of Numbers 5 (the portion thought by critics to be the later version of the remainder).

Another aspect of the "priestly teacher's" apparent style is a concentration on atonement for uncleanliness and sin, particularly via rituals involving "wave offerings". In textual criticism, the laws attributed to this writer are seen as having formed an earlier independent collection of laws, which were later added to the Priestly Code by an editor, and may, slightly, pre-date the Priestly Source.

Another set of distinctive colophons are those of the form this is the law of [subject A], and [subject B], and [subject C], ...., which occur for Leviticus 7:28-38, 11:1-47, 13:47-59, 14:33-57, and 15:1-31. Of these, Leviticus 15 is noticeably repetitive, repeating both bathe [itself] in water and be unclean until the even, for almost every verse, as well as the detail of the atonement sacrifice. This chapter is therefore, under academic criticism, viewed as a late expansion of an earlier, much shorter, law, which simply laid out the basic rule that running issue of bodily fluids is ritually unclean, and contact with it, including with the person that possesses it, is ritually unclean, rather than detailing the atonement sacrifice, and listing examples of what constitutes contact.

Another of these, Leviticus 11, which defines and lists animals which are ritually unclean, also provides an extensive list. Several of the laws appear very similar to those given on the subject in Holiness Code, and thus several critics infer that this chapter is a later expansion of the Holiness Code. Other critics view the chapter as an excerpt from a further once independent body of teaching, a view not completely incompatible with those who see it as ultimately being based on the Holiness Code. The relationship of Leviticus 15, and the other, less list-like, sections having the same style of colophon as Leviticus 11, to this supposed earlier body, is not generally agreed upon. However, even if they are part of this earlier collection, it is generally considered that each appear be based on laws from different periods of history to one another, since some, such as Leviticus 14:33-57, include less naturalistic rituals for transferring sin, and others, such as Leviticus 15 prefer a ritual of atonement, and yet others, such as Leviticus 13:47-59 do not mention atonement at all.

Another distinct style is that of case law, in which the basic outline of a brief problem is described, such as Leviticus 15:32-41, discussing how to deal with a man who has collected sticks on the sabbath, and whether that constitutes a violation of the rule not to commit work on that day, and then the solution is explained by Moses, often after he has consulted with God. This is present on multiple occasions, such as concerning the daughters of Zelophehad, as well when the issue of the little passover was raised at Numbers 9:1-14. While many of these instances have, according to textual criticism, the resemblance of a single source, there are nevertheless portions which appear to be later layers, such as the additional return to the daughters of Zelophehad in Leviticus 36 to discuss a slightly different matter.

Much of the remainder of the Priestly Code is viewed as more disparate. The benediction at Leviticus 6:22-27 is viewed as a late addition to that chapter, including for linguistic reasons concerning the manner of wording used within it as dating from an historically later period. Even later still is, according to critical scholarship, Leviticus 27, regarding vows, which mentions a tithe of cattle, a tithe not mentioned anywhere else in the torah, even when tithes, or the treatment of cattle, is discussed.
