= Les Dix Commandements =

Les Dix Commandements (French: The Ten Commandments), Dix Commandements, les 10 Commandements, 10 Commandements, may refer to:

- Les Dix Commandements (musical), a 2000 French-language stage musical
  - Les Dix Commandements: L'Intégral, a 2001 album of the eponymous 2000 musical Les Dix Commandements
- "Les dix commandements", a 1998 French album; see List of best-selling albums in France
- "Les Dix Commandements", a 1979 composition by Alexandre Tansman
- Les Dix Commandements, a 10 volume work from 1910 by Émile Faguet

== See also ==
- Ten Commandments (disambiguation)
