= The Eleventh Commandment (novel) =

1998 novel by Jeffrey Archer

- First edition (publ. HarperCollins, UK)
- Author: Jeffrey Archer
- Publisher: HarperCollins
- Publication date: June 15, 1998
- ISBN: 978-0-06-019150-4

The Eleventh Commandment is a novel by Jeffrey Archer, first published in 1998. The title refers to the rule Thou Shalt Not Get Caught.

== Plot summary ==
CIA Chief Helen Dexter independently decides to order the assassination of political figures from other nations based on their views toward the United States. The book begins with the assassination of a Colombian presidential candidate. During this time, Helen discovers that she would be fired if it is discovered that she is ordering assassinations in several countries. To cover up her work she plans to have her chief assassin, Connor Fitzgerald, eliminated. The CIA rejects Connor's resignation and asks him to go on a final mission to assassinate a candidate for the Russian presidency. While attending a speech, Connor is arrested and placed in a Russian jail to be executed. A friend of his arrives in time and tries to rescue him by making a bargain with the Russian Mafia. In exchange for Fitzgerald to be replaced with his friend, Fitzgerald will have to assassinate the Russian president. Fitzgerald fails in the attempt and "dies." Later on he returns home with the name of a professor and he has lost his arm.
