= Jacob Milgrom =

American rabbi and academic (1923–2010)

- יעקב מילגרום
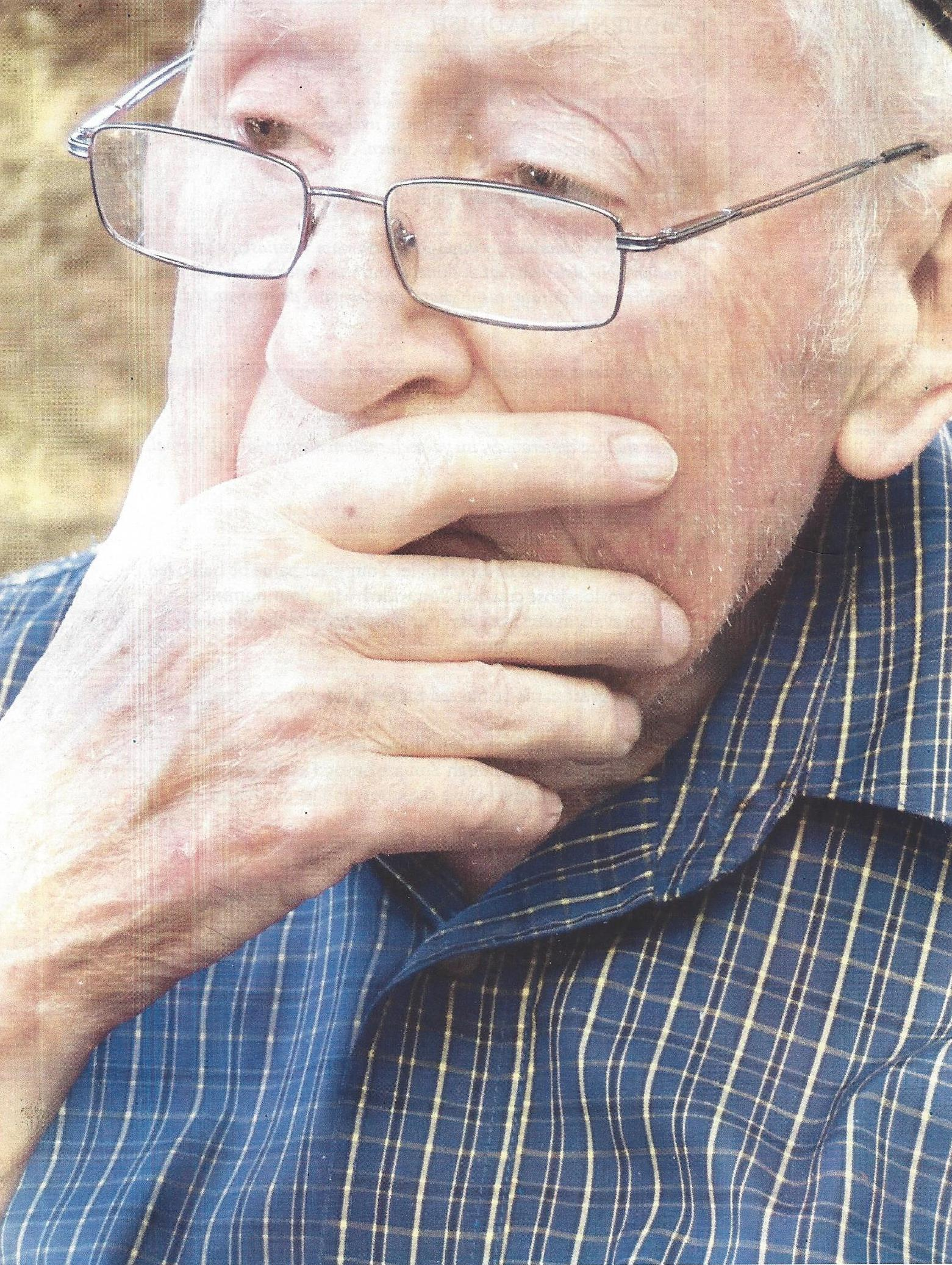
- Born: February 1, 1923; Brooklyn, New York
- Died: June 5, 2010 (aged 87); Jerusalem
- Known for: comprehensive Torah commentaries
- Spouse: Jo Berman
- Children: 4, including Rabbi Jeremy Milgrom

Academic background
- Education: Brooklyn College, Jewish Theological Seminary of America

Academic work
- Discipline: Biblical studies
- Sub-discipline: Torah studies
- Institutions: University of California, Berkeley
- Notable works: JPS Torah Commentary: Numbers; Leviticus 3 vols.(AYB)
- Influenced: Christine Hayes, Yale Director of Graduate Studies in the Department of Religious Studies.

Jacob Milgrom (Hebrew: יעקב מילגרום; February 1, 1923 – June 5, 2010) was a prominent American Jewish Bible scholar and Conservative rabbi. Milgrom's major contribution to biblical research was in the field of cult and worship. Although he accepted the documentary hypothesis, contrary to the classical bible critics, he traced a direct line of development from the Priestly Code (P), to the Holiness Code (H), to the cultic innovations of Ezekiel, to the cultic writings of the Dead Sea sect and finally to Jewish law (halacha) of the Mishnah and Talmud. Best known for his comprehensive Torah commentaries and work on the Dead Sea Scrolls, he also published extensively on the Book of Ezekiel.

== Biography ==
Jacob Milgrom was born in Brooklyn, New York in 1923. He studied at Brooklyn College and the Jewish Theological Seminary of America in New York City. In 1948, he married Jo Berman, also a biblical scholar. They had four children.

== Academic career ==
Jacob Milgrom spent most of his career at the University of California, Berkeley, where he headed the Department of Near Eastern Studies. He was known for his research on Biblical purity laws and on the book of Leviticus.

After retiring in 1994, Milgrom and his wife Jo immigrated to Israel. He died in Jerusalem in June 2010.

== Published works ==
=== Books ===
- Studies in Levitical Terminology. Berkeley: Univ. of California Press, 1970. ISBN 0-520-09308-9.
- Studies in Cultic Theology and Terminology. E.J. Brill, 1983. ISBN 90-04-06864-3.
- Pomegranates and Golden Bells: Studies in Biblical, Jewish, and Near Eastern Ritual, Law, and Literature. Winona Lake, Ind.: Eisenbrauns, 1995. ISBN 0-931464-87-0.
- The JPS Torah Commentary: Numbers. Philadelphia: Jewish Publication Society, 1996. ISBN 0-8276-0329-0.
- Leviticus 1-16. New York: Anchor Bible, 1998. ISBN 0-385-11434-6.
- Leviticus 17–22. New York: Anchor Bible, 2000. ISBN 0-385-41255-X.
- Leviticus 23–27. New York: Anchor Bible, 2000. ISBN 0-385-50035-1.
- Leviticus: A Book of Ritual and Ethics. Minneapolis: Fortress Press, 2004. ISBN 0-8006-9514-3.
- Ezekiel's Hope: A Commentary on Ezekiel 38 - 48, with Daniel I. Block. Eugene: Cascade Books, 2012. ISBN 978-1-61097-650-3.

=== Articles ===
- “The Biblical Diet Laws as an Ethical System.” Interpretation. (July 1963).
- “The Alleged Wave–Offering in Israel and in the Ancient Near East.” Israel Exploration Journal. 22 (1972): 33–38.
- “Atonement in the OT,” “Atonement, Day of,” “Encroachment,” “First fruits, OT,” “First-born,” “Heave offering,” “Leviticus,” “Repentance in the OT,” “Sacrifices and Offerings, OT,” “Sanctification,” and “Wave offering.” In The Interpreter’s Dictionary of the Bible. Supp. vol., 78–83, 264–65, 336–38, 391–92, 541–45, 736–38, 763–71, 782–84, 944–46. Nashville, Tenn: Abingdon, 1976. ISBN 0-687-19269-2.
- “The Temple Scroll.” Biblical Archaeologist. 41 (3) (Sep. 1978): 105–120.
- “The Case of the Suspected Adulteress, Numbers 5:11–31: Redaction and Meaning.” In The Creation of Sacred Literature. Edited by Richard E. Friedman, 69–75. Berkeley: Univ. of California Press, 1981. ISBN 0-520-09637-1.
- “The Levitic Town: An Exercise in Realistic Planning.” In Essays in Honour of Yigael Yadin. Edited by Géza Vermes and Jacob Neusner. Totowa, N.J.: Allanheld, Osmun and Co., 1983. ISBN 0-86598-102-7.
- “Magic, Monotheism, and the Sin of Moses.” In The Quest for the Kingdom of God: Studies in Honor of George E. Mendenhall. Edited by H. B. Huffmon, F.A. Spina, A.R.W. Green, 251–265. Winona Lake, Indiana: Eisenbrauns, 1983. ISBN 0-931464-15-3.
- “Of Hems and Tassels: Rank, authority and holiness were expressed in antiquity by fringes on garments.” Biblical Archaeology Review. 9 (3) (May/June 1983).
- “Challenge to Sun-Worship Interpretation of Temple Scroll’s Gilded Staircase.” Biblical Archaeology Review. 11 (1) (Jan./Feb. 1985).
- “The Chieftain’s Gifts: Numbers, Chapter 7,” Hebrew Annual Review. 9 (1985): 221–225.
- “‘You Shall Not Boil a Kid in Its Mother’s Milk’: An archaeological myth destroyed.” Bible Review. 1 (3) (Fall 1985): 48–55.
- "Ethics and Ritual: The Foundations of the Biblical Dietary Laws." In Religion and Law: Biblical, Jewish, and Islamic Perspectives, 159–91. Edited by E.B. Firmage. Winona Lake, Indiana: Eisenbrauns, 1989. ISBN 0-931464-39-0.
- “Seeing the Ethical Within the Ritual: Israel’s priests spoke in rituals, not in words. Their basic values are in the main ethical, and are ensconced in the rituals prescribed in the priestly texts of the Pentateuch.” Bible Review. 8 (4) (Aug. 1992).
- “Food and Faith: The Ethical Foundations of the Biblical Diet Laws: The Bible has worked out a system of restrictions whereby humans may satiate their lust for animal flesh and not be dehumanized. These laws teach reverence for life.” Bible Review. 8 (6) (Dec. 1992).
- “The Priestly ‘Picture of Dorian Gray’: Ancient Israel's priests would be aghast at the moral pollution of the earth: the brazen slaughter of thousands, millions dying of hunger, while the free world silently changes the channel.” Bible Review. 9 (2) (Apr. 1993).
- “Sweet Land and Liberty: Whether real or utopian, the laws in Leviticus seem to be a more sensitive safeguard against pauperization than we, here and now, have devised.” Bible Review. 9 (4) (Aug. 1993).
- “Does the Bible Prohibit Homosexuality? The biblical prohibition is addressed only to Israel. It is incorrect to apply it on a universal scale.” Bible Review. 9 (6) (Dec. 1993).
- “How Not to Read the Bible: I am not for homosexuality, but I am for homosexuals. When the Bible is distorted to make God their enemy I must speak out to set the record straight.” Bible Review. 10 (2) (Apr. 1994).
- “An Amputated Bible, Peradventure? The publishing house of Simon and Schuster has come up with a radical solution to the problem of “boring” passages in the Bible: Eliminate them.” Bible Review. 10 (4) (Aug. 1994).
- “Sex and Wisdom: What the Garden of Eden Story Is Saying: There is a plain, unambiguous meaning to the story: It is about sexual awareness and the creativity of which that is a part.” Bible Review. 10 (6) (Dec. 1994).
- “Bible Versus Babel: Why did God tell Abraham to leave Mesopotamia, the most advanced civilization of its time, for the backwater region of Canaan?” Bible Review. 11 (2) (Apr. 1995).
- “The Most Basic Law in the Bible: It is easy to ‘love’ the war-ravaged Bosnians, the AIDS-stricken Zaireans or the bereaved of Oklahoma City. But what of the strangers in our midst, the vagrants on our sidewalks?” Bible Review. 11 (4) (Aug. 1994).
- “‘The Alien in Your Midst’: Every nation has its ger: the permanent resident. The Torah commands us, first, not to oppress the ger, and then to befriend and love him.” Bible Review. 11 (6) (Dec. 1995).
- “Lex Talionis and the Rabbis: The Talmud reflects an uneasy rabbinic conscience toward the ancient law of talion, ‘eye for eye, tooth for tooth.’” Bible Review. 12 (2) (Apr. 1996).
- “A Husband’s Pride, A Mob’s Prejudice: The public ordeal undergone by a suspected adulteress in Numbers 5 was meant not to humiliate her but to protect her.” Bible Review. 12 (4) (Aug. 1996).
- “Shifting Borders: The Whole Land of Israel.” Moment. (Aug. 1996): 52.
- “Albert Schweitzer: Doctor, Musician, Theologian.” Bible Review. 12 (5) (Oct. 1996).
- “The Water Libation in the Festival of Booths: Nonbiblical rites, though originating in popular worship and rooted in magical practice, were ultimately assimilated into Israel’s official monotheism.” Bible Review. 12 (6) (Dec. 1996).
- “Jubilee: A Rallying Cry for Today’s Oppressed: The laws of the Jubilee year offer a blueprint for bridging the gap between the have and have-not nations.” Bible Review. 13 (2) (Apr. 1997).
- “The Blood Taboo: Blood should not be ingested because it contains life. Whoever does so is guilty of murder.” Bible Review. 13 (4) (Aug. 1997).
- “The Vow and the ‘Popular Religious Groups’ of Ancient Israel: A Philological and Sociological Inquiry.” Journal of the American Oriental Society. 118 (4) (Oct. 1, 1998): 592.
- “The Truth of Mosaic Origins.” In Mincha: Festgabe Fur Rolf Rendtorff Zum 75. Geburtstag. Edited by E. Blum. Neukirchen-Vluyn: Neukirchener Verlag, 2000.
