= Decalogue Stone =

Decalogue Stone may refer to:

- Los Lunas Decalogue Stone, a large boulder on the side of Hidden Mountain, near Los Lunas, New Mexico, that bears a Hebrew inscription of unknown provenance
- Newark Holy Stones, a set of artifacts, including a Decalogue and stone box, allegedly discovered within a cluster of ancient Indian burial mounds near Newark, Ohio.

== See also ==
- Decalogue (disambiguation)
