= Leviticus 19 =

Book of Leviticus, chapter 19

- ← chapter 18 chapter 20 →
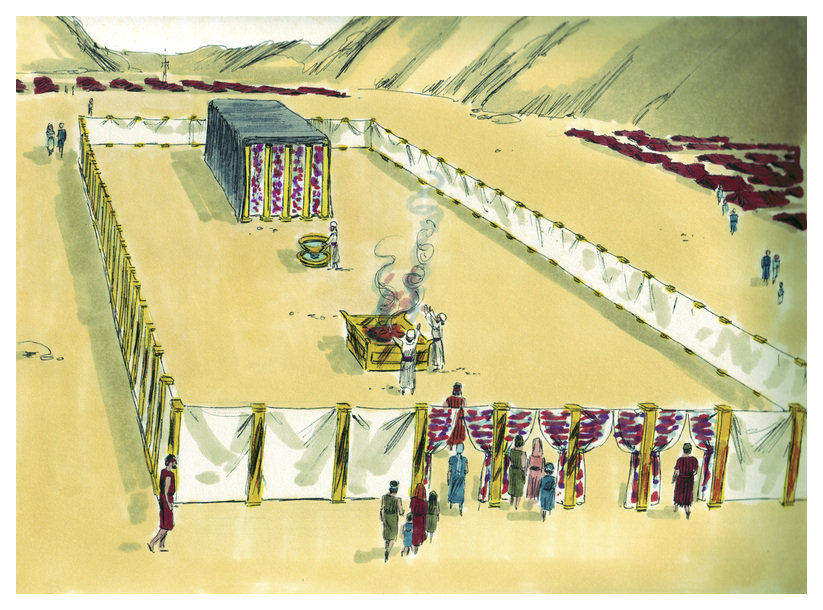
- "Tabernacle", Biblical illustrations, Sweet Media, 1984.
- Book: Book of Leviticus
- Hebrew Bible part: Torah
- Order in the Hebrew part: 3
- Category: Torah
- Christian Bible part: Old Testament
- Order in the Christian part: 3

Leviticus 19 is the nineteenth chapter of the Book of Leviticus in the Hebrew Bible or the Old Testament of the Christian Bible. It contains laws on a variety of topics, and is attributed by tradition to Moses.

== Text ==
The original text of Leviticus 19, like the rest of Leviticus, was written in Hebrew. Some of the more ancient Hebrew sources for this chapter, are the Masoretic Text, Dead Sea Scrolls, and Samaritan Pentateuch. There is also a Greek translation known as the Septuagint, from the 3rd century BC. Since the introduction of chapter divisions in the late medieval period, this chapter is divided into 37 verses.

== Synopsis ==
The chapter begins with God giving Moses a message for the Israelites about the need to be holy, to respect parents, and to avoid idolatry (verses 1–4). Next are instructions for peace offerings (5–8), food aid for poor people and foreigners (9–10), and various instructions relating to ethical treatment of others (11–18) and agricultural practices (19). The chapter penalises adulterous relations between a free man and a married female slave (20–22), and restricts the use of fruit from young trees (23–25). The chapter closes with a variety of other regulations on several subjects (26–36) and a general instruction to obey all of God's commands (37).

The laws of Leviticus 19 are put in no obvious order, and as a result scholars tend to think that the chapter includes a collection of regulations from various sources.

The practice of leaving a portion of crops in the field for poor people or foreigners to use, mentioned in verses 9 and 10, reappears in the second chapter of the Book of Ruth.

== Golden Rule ==
Included in this chapter is the Golden Rule (verse 18), which states (Hebrew: ואהבת לרעך כמוך):

You shall not take vengeance or bear a grudge against your kinsfolk. Love your neighbor as yourself: I am the LORD.

— Leviticus 19:18

Hillel the Elder (c. 110 BC – 10 AD) used this verse as a most important message of the Torah for his teachings. Once, he was challenged by a gentile who asked to be converted under the condition that the Torah be explained to him while he stood on one foot. Hillel accepted him as a candidate for conversion to Judaism but, drawing on Leviticus 19:18, briefed the man:

What is hateful to you, do not do to your fellow: this is the whole Torah; the rest is the explanation; go and learn.

— Shabbath folio:31a, Babylonian Talmud

== Judaism ==
In Judaism, the whole chapter is part of the weekly Torah portion (parashah) Kedoshim (קְדֹשִׁים) which comprises Leviticus 19:1–20:27.

In addition, the chapter (or parts of it) is sometimes used as the Torah reading during the afternoon service on Yom Kippur, particularly in Reform Judaism, Reconstructionist Judaism, and Conservative Judaism. In that context, it is used as a substitute for the traditional reading, which is the previous chapter, Leviticus 18.

== Decalogue ==
This chapter contains statements that echo the contents of much of the Ten Commandments (Decalogue).

Topic	Leviticus 19	Exodus 20
graven images	19:4	20:3
using God's name in vain	19:12	20:7
the sabbath	19:3, 30	20:8–12
honouring parents	19:3	20:12
murder	19:16	20:13
adultery	19:29	20:14
stealing	19:11, 13	20:15
lying	19:11	20:16

However, the relationship is not obvious because the wording, much of the precise concept and the order of presentation are different.

== See also ==
- Marry-your-rapist law
- Matthew 22
- Ruth

== Bibliography ==
=== Commentaries on Leviticus ===
- Balentine, Samuel E (2002). Leviticus. Westminster John Knox Press. ISBN 9780664237356.
- Grabbe, Lester L. (2007). "6. Leviticus". In Barton, John; Muddiman, John (eds.). The Oxford Bible Commentary (first (paperback) ed.). Oxford University Press. pp. 91–110. ISBN 978-0199277186.
- Gerstenberger, Erhard S (1996). Leviticus: A Commentary. Westminster John Knox Press. ISBN 9780664226732.
- Gorman, Frank H (1997). Divine presence and community: a commentary on the Book of Leviticus. Eerdmans. ISBN 9780802801104.
- Grabbe, Lester (1998). "Leviticus". In John Barton (ed.). Oxford Bible Commentary. Oxford University Press. ISBN 9780198755005.
- Hartley, John E. (1992). Leviticus. Word. ISBN 0849902037.
- Houston, Walter J (2003). "Leviticus". In James D. G. Dunn, John William Rogerson (ed.). Eerdmans Bible Commentary. Eerdmans. ISBN 9780802837110.
- Goldstone, Matthew S. (17 September 2018). The Dangerous Duty of Rebuke: Leviticus 19:17 in Early Jewish and Christian Interpretation. BRILL. ISBN 978-90-04-37655-7.
- Kleinig, John W (2004). Leviticus. Concordia Publishing House. ISBN 9780570063179.
- Levine, Baruch A. (1989). JPS Torah Commentary: Leviticus. Jewish Publication Society. Archived from the original on 2016-08-05.
- Milgrom, Jacob (2000). Leviticus 17-22: A New Translation with Introduction and Commentary. Yale University Press. ISBN 978-0-300-14056-9.
- Milgrom, Jacob (2004). Leviticus: A Book of Ritual and Ethics. Minneapolis: Fortress. ISBN 9781451410150.
- Wenham, Gordon (1979). The book of Leviticus. Eerdmans. ISBN 9780802825223.
