= The Eleventh Commandment (film) =

The Eleventh Commandment is the title of the following films:

- The Eleventh Commandment, a 1913 short starring Gladys Cooper
- The Eleventh Commandment, a 1918 film directed by Ralph Ince
- The Eleventh Commandment (1924 film)
- The Eleventh Commandment (1933 film)
- Jedenácté přikázání (1935), also known as The Eleventh Commandment, a Czech comedy
- The Eleventh Commandment (1970 film)
- UK video title of Sword of Gideon, a 1986 TV movie
- The Eleventh Commandment, a 1986 horror film directed by Paul Leder
- The Eleventh Commandment, alternate title for Body Count or Camping del Terrore, a 1987 slasher/horror film
- The Eleventh Commandment, alternate title for A unsprezecea poruncă, a 1991 Romanian drama film directed by Mircea Daneliuc
