= Covenant Code =

Exodus 20:22-23:19

The Covenant Code, or Book of the Covenant, is the name given by academics to a text appearing in the Torah, at Exodus 20:22–23:19; or, more strictly, the term Covenant Code may be applied to Exodus 21:1–22:16. Biblically, the text is the second of the law codes said to have been given to Moses by God at Mount Sinai. This legal text provides a small but substantive proportion of the mitzvot (religious duties) within the Torah, and hence is a source of Jewish Law.

== Academic context ==
The date that the Covenant Code was composed, and the details of how it found its way into the Bible, continue to be debated. Most proponents of the documentary hypothesis associate it with either the Elohist ("E") materials, or, less commonly, the Yahwist ("J") materials. (These are two of the four sources of the classic documentary hypothesis, the other two being the Deuteronomic ("D") material and Priestly ("P") material.) According to Joel Baden, "The Covenant Code is a part of E; the priestly laws [of Leviticus and Numbers] are part of P; and the deuteronomic laws [of Deuteronomy 12–26] stand at the center of D." Regardless of precise positions on the process, scholars agree that the Covenant Code was produced by a long process in which it changed over time.

A study of continuing importance is that of Albrecht Alt, who in 1934 published an analysis of the Covenant Code which hinges on the distinction between casuistic and apodictic law. The Covenant Code consists largely of case or casuistic law (often in the form of an "if-then" statement, in which specific situations are addressed), as for example Exodus 21:33–36. Apodictic laws (characterized by absolute or general commands or prohibitions, as in the Ten Commandments) on the other hand, also appear in the Covenant Code, for example in Exodus 21:17 ("Whoever curses father or mother shall be put to death"). Alt claimed, though some scholars disagree, that the apodictic laws were a feature only found in Israelite codes. Scholars do, however, agree that the contrast between the apodictic and casuistic forms is a clue to how multiple sources of law were edited together into the Covenant Code, although there remain disagreements over the precise details.

The form and content of the code is similar to many other codes from the Near East of the second millennium BC. It also resembles the Babylonian Code of Hammurabi. According to many scholars including Martin Noth and Albrecht Alt, the covenant code probably originated as a civil code with the Canaanites, and was altered to add Hebrew religious practices. Michael Coogan sees a noticeable difference between the Covenant Code and the non-biblical codes like the Code of Hammurabi. The Covenant Code, like other biblical codes, differs from these by including among the laws dealing with criminal and civil matters various regulations concerning worship. Both, however, set the laws in an explicitly religious context.

== Relationship to the Ritual Decalogue ==
Some of the commandments in the Covenant Code overlap noticeably with the commandments in the Ritual Decalogue. Robert Pfeiffer suggested that the Covenant Code is an expansion of the Ritual Decalogue. Carol Meyers holds that the direction of influence is in the opposite direction: that Exodus 34 borrows material from within the Covenant Code.

== Evident values ==
The Covenant Code portrays the values of the society in which it was produced, some of which are different from Western twentieth-century values.

With the ancient cultural view of women as property of men, the casuistic law regarding the seduced virgin in Exodus 22:16–17 portrays a woman who, as the property of her father, has had her value diminished by the loss of her virginity. However, this law still calls for restitution to be paid by the man who seduced her. A second example comes from Exodus 21:20–21, which describes the punishment required for a slave owner who strikes his slave with a rod. If the slave survives their injuries no punishment is required because they do not have the same rights as Israelite males.

In some instances, the values represented in the Covenant Code are more similar to present-day, Western values. Two examples include the placing of mothers on the same level as fathers in Exodus 21:15, 17, and providing for special care of members of lesser social classes, including converts, widows and orphans (Exodus 22:21–22).
