= Ritual Decalogue =

List of laws at Exodus 34:11–26

The Ritual Decalogue is a list of laws at Exodus 34:11–26. These laws are similar to the Covenant Code and are followed by the phrase "Ten Commandments" (Hebrew: עשרת הדברים aseret ha-dvarîm, in Exodus 34:28). Although the phrase "Ten Commandments" has traditionally been interpreted as referring to a very different set of laws, in Exodus 20:2–17, many scholars believe it instead refers to the Ritual Decalogue found two verses earlier.

Critical biblical scholars understand the two sets of laws to have different authorship. Early scholars, adopting a proposal of Johann Wolfgang von Goethe, contrasted the "Ritual" Decalogue with the "Ethical" Decalogue of Exodus 20:2–17 and Deuteronomy 5:6–21, which are the texts more generally known as the Ten Commandments. Believing that the Bible reflected a shift over time from an emphasis on the ritual to the ethical, they argued that the Ritual Decalogue was composed earlier than the Ethical Decalogue. Later scholars have held that they were actually parallel developments, with the Ethical Decalogue a late addition to Exodus copied from Deuteronomy, or that the Ritual Decalogue was the later of the two, a conservative reaction to the secular Ethical Decalogue. A few Bible scholars call the verses in Exodus 34 the "small Covenant code", as it appears to be a compact version of the Covenant Code in Exodus 20:19–23:33; they argue the small Covenant code was composed around the same time as the Decalogue of Exodus 20, but either served different functions within Israelite religion, or reflects the influence of other Ancient Near Eastern religious texts.

The word decalogue comes from the Greek name for the Ten Commandments, δέκα λόγοι (déka lógoi; "ten terms"), a translation of the Hebrew עשרת הדברים (aseret ha-dvarîm "the ten items/terms").

== Biblical context ==
The Ritual Decalogue is framed in the context of God making a covenant with Israel:

Yahweh said to Moses, Cut two tablets of stone like the former ones, and I will write on the tablets the words that were on the former tablets, which you broke. ... I hereby make a covenant.

[Commandments of Exodus 34]

Yahweh said to Moses, Write these words; in accordance with these words I have made a covenant with you and with Israel. ... And he wrote on the tablets the words of the covenant, the ten commandments [עשרת הדברים aseret ha-dvarîm].

Assuming that Moses is being commanded to write down the content of verses 15–26 on the new tablets, this would be the only place in the Bible where the phrase Ten Commandments identifies an explicit set of commandments.

== Interpretations ==
While Orthodox Judaism and Christianity hold that both sets of tablets contained the same ten commandments, some scholars identify verses 11–26 as an alternate "ten commandments" which they call the "ritual" decalogue. For these scholars, the terms "ritual decalogue" and "ethical decalogue" are a way of distinguishing between alternate inscriptions of the ten commandments.

The commandments in the Ritual Decalogue are expanded upon in the Covenant Code, which occurs prior to it in the Torah, and thus have the impression of being a summary of the important points in the Code. The Covenant Code is believed by most scholars of biblical criticism as having originally been a separate text to the Torah, and thus there is much debate as to the relationship between the Ritual Decalogue and Covenant Code. There are essentially two positions, neither of which is decisively supported, either by evidence, or by number of scholars:

- Either the commandments of the Ritual Decalogue were originally indistinct commandments in the body of a much larger work, such as the Covenant Code, and were selected as being the most important by some process, whether gradual filtering or by an individual,
- Or the Covenant Code represents a later expansion of the Ritual Decalogue, with additional commandments added on, again either by gradual aggregation, or by an individual.

The documentary hypothesis identifies the Ritual Decalogue as the work of the Jahwist, from the Kingdom of Judah, and the Covenant Code as that of the Elohist, from the Kingdom of Israel, both writing independently. It does not however answer the question of how these texts were related, merely that the Ritual Decalogue circulated in Judah, and the Covenant Code in Israel. What the documentary hypothesis does partly explain is the relationship of the Ritual Decalogue to the Ethical Decalogue, and why, instead of the Ethical Decalogue, it is the Ritual Decalogue which is written on the two tablets when Moses ascends the mountain to have the Ethical Decalogue inscribed for a second time.

The documentary hypothesis claims that the Jahwist and Elohist texts were first combined by a redactor, producing a text referred to simply as JE, in such a way that it now reads that God dictated the Covenant Code, which was written onto stone, Moses subsequently smashing these stones at the incident of the golden calf, and thus having to go back and get a new set, with a set of commandments, the Ritual Decalogue, resembling the first. Under this reconstruction another writer, the Priestly source, later took offence at parts of JE, and rewrote it, dropping the story of the golden calf, and replacing the Ritual Decalogue with a new (ethical) decalogue initially based on it, but taking commandments from elsewhere as well, and replacing the Covenant Code with a vast new law code, placed after the Decalogue for narrative reasons, most of which forms the greater part of the mitzvot in Leviticus.

The reconstruction then suggests that a century later yet another writer, the Deuteronomist, objected to the Priestly source, and rewrote it yet again, but in a different style: that of a series of flashbacks, producing a second slightly different copy of the Ethical Decalogue, and re-introducing the golden calf. Presented with such divergent versions of the same event, a later redactor is thought to have combined all three versions – JE, the Priestly source, and Deuteronomist, together. JE and the Priestly source were interleaved together, altering JE so that it was now the Ethical Decalogue which was written on the first set of tablets and subsequently destroyed. The alteration, by careful juxtaposition, subtly implied that the second set of tablets also received the Ethical rather than Ritual Decalogue, despite the text saying, immediately after the Ritual Decalogue,

The LORD said to Moses, Write these words; in accordance with these words I have made a covenant with you and with Israel. [...] And he wrote on the tablets the words of the covenant, the ten commandments [emphasis added]

== Decalogues compared ==
Besides its appearance in Exodus 34:28, where "[t]raditionally, it is taken as a reference back to the Ten Commandments in Exodus 20", the phrase aseret ha-dvarîm also appears in Deuteronomy 4:13, where it is associated with the Ten Commandments of Deuteronomy 5, and in Deuteronomy 10:4.

Ritual Decalogue, Exodus 34:11–26	"The Ten Commandments" Ethical Decalogue, Exodus 20:2–17	Ethical Decalogue, Deuteronomy 5:6–21
11 Observe what I command you today. See, I will drive out before you the Amorites, the Canaanites, the Hittites, the Perizzites, the Hivites, and the Jebusites. 12 Take care not to make a covenant with the inhabitants of the land to which you are going, or it will become a snare among you. 13 You shall tear down their altars, break their pillars, and cut down their sacred poles 14 (for you shall worship no other god, because the Lord, whose name is Jealous, is a jealous God). 15 You shall not make a covenant with the inhabitants of the land, for when they prostitute themselves to their gods and sacrifice to their gods, someone among them will invite you, and you will eat of the sacrifice. 16 And you will take wives from among their daughters for your sons, and their daughters who prostitute themselves to their gods will make your sons also prostitute themselves to their gods. 17 You shall not make cast idols. 18 You shall keep the festival of unleavened bread. For seven days you shall eat unleavened bread, as I commanded you, at the time appointed in the month of Abib; for in the month of Abib you came out from Egypt. 19 All that first opens the womb is mine, all your male livestock, the firstborn of cow and sheep. 20 The firstborn of a donkey you shall redeem with a lamb, or if you will not redeem it you shall break its neck. All the firstborn of your sons you shall redeem. No one shall appear before me empty-handed. 21 For six days you shall work, but on the seventh day you shall rest; even in ploughing time and in harvest time you shall rest. 22 You shall observe the festival of weeks, the first fruits of wheat harvest, and the festival of ingathering at the turn of the year. 23 Three times in the year all your males shall appear before the Lord God, the God of Israel. 24 For I will cast out nations before you, and enlarge your borders; no one shall covet your land when you go up to appear before the Lord your God three times in the year. 25 You shall not offer the blood of my sacrifice with leaven, and the sacrifice of the festival of the passover shall not be left until the morning. 26 The best of the first fruits of your ground you shall bring to the house of the Lord your God. You shall not boil a kid in its mother's milk.	2 I am the Lord your God, who brought you up out of the land of Egypt, out of the house of slavery; 3 Do not have any other gods before me. 4 You shall not make for yourself an idol, whether in the form of anything that is in heaven above, or that is on the earth beneath, or that is in the water under the earth. 5 You shall not bow down to them or worship them; for I the Lord your God am a jealous God, punishing children for the iniquity of parents, to the third and the fourth generation of those who reject me, 6 but showing steadfast love to the thousandth generation of those who love me and keep my commandments. 7 You shall not make wrongful use of the name of the Lord your God, for the Lord will not acquit anyone who misuses his name. 8 Remember the Sabbath day and keep it holy. 9 For six days you shall labour and do all your work. 10 But the seventh day is a Sabbath to the Lord your God; you shall not do any work—you, your son or your daughter, your male or female slave, your livestock, or the alien resident in your towns. 11 For in six days the Lord made heaven and earth, the sea, and all that is in them, but rested the seventh day; therefore the Lord blessed the Sabbath day and consecrated it. 12 Honor your father and your mother, so that your days may be long in the land that the Lord your God is giving you. 13 You shall not murder. 14 You shall not commit adultery. 15 You shall not steal. 16 You shall not bear false witness against your neighbor. 17 You shall not covet your neighbor's house; you shall not covet your neighbor's wife, or male or female slave, or ox, or donkey, or anything that belongs to your neighbor.	6 I am the Lord your God, who brought you out of the land of Egypt, out of the house of slavery; 7 you shall have no other gods before me. 8 You shall not make for yourself an idol, whether in the form of anything that is in heaven above, or that is on the earth beneath, or that is in the water under the earth. 9 You shall not bow down to them or worship them; for I the Lord your God am a jealous God, punishing children for the iniquity of parents, to the third and fourth generation of those who reject me, 10 but showing steadfast love to the thousandth generation of those who love me and keep my commandments. 11 You shall not make wrongful use of the name of the Lord your God, for the Lord will not acquit anyone who misuses his name. 12 Observe the sabbath day and keep it holy, as the Lord your God commanded you. 13 For six days you shall labour and do all your work. 14 But the seventh day is a Sabbath to the Lord your God; you shall not do any work—you, or your son or your daughter, or your male or female slave, or your ox or your donkey, or any of your livestock, or the resident alien in your towns, so that your male and female slave may rest as well as you. 15 Remember that you were a slave in the land of Egypt, and the Lord your God brought you out from there with a mighty hand and an outstretched arm; therefore the Lord your God commanded you to keep the sabbath day. 16 Honor your father and your mother, as the Lord your God commanded you, so that your days may be long and that it may go well with you in the land that the Lord your God is giving you. 17 You shall not murder. 18 Neither shall you commit adultery. 19 Neither shall you steal. 20 Neither shall you bear false witness against your neighbor. 21 Neither shall you covet your neighbor's wife. Neither shall you desire your neighbor's house, or field, or male or female slave, or ox, or donkey, or anything that belongs to your neighbor.

== Covenant codes compared ==
Some scholars, calling attention to Exodus 34:10, "Then the LORD said: 'I am making a covenant with you'," note that the laws of Exodus 34 appear to be a shorter and differently organized version of the Covenant Code (Exodus 20:22–23:33). These have been differentiated as the "Small Covenant Code" (Exodus 34) and the "Large Covenant Code" (Exodus 20–23). These views are not mutually exclusive. Aaron (2006), for example, discusses how the "Exodus 34 Decalogue", while presented as the Ten Commandments, appears to be a reworking of the Covenant Code. Indeed, H.L. Ginsberg believed that the Ritual Decalogue was an interpolation, and that the phrase "Ten Commandments" in Exodus 34:28 originally referred to a portion of the Covenant Code, Exodus 23:10–27, which he called the First Ritual Decalogue.

Small Covenant Code, Exodus 34:11–26	parallel section of the Large Covenant Code, Exodus 23:10–
11 Observe what I command you today. See, I will drive out before you the Amorites, the Canaanites, the Hittites, the Perizzites, the Hivites, and the Jebusites.	22 But if you listen attentively to his voice and do all that I say, then I will be an enemy to your enemies and a foe to your foes. 23 When my angel goes in front of you, and brings you to the Amorites, the Hittites, the Perizzites, the Canaanites, the Hivites, and the Jebusites, and I blot them out,
12 Take care not to make a covenant with the inhabitants of the land to which you are going, or it will become a snare among you. 13 You shall tear down their altars, break their pillars, and cut down their sacred poles 14 (for you shall worship no other god, because the Lord, whose name is Jealous, is a jealous God). 15 You shall not make a covenant with the inhabitants of the land, for when they prostitute themselves to their gods and sacrifice to their gods, someone among them will invite you, and you will eat of the sacrifice. 16 And you will take wives from among their daughters for your sons, and their daughters who prostitute themselves to their gods will make your sons also prostitute themselves to their gods.	32 You shall make no covenant with them and their gods. 33 They shall not live in your land, or they will make you sin against me; for if you worship their gods, it will surely be a snare to you. 24 Thou shalt not bow down to their gods, nor serve them, nor do after their doings; but thou shalt utterly overthrow them, and break in pieces their pillars. 13 Be attentive to all that I have said to you. Do not invoke the names of other gods; do not let them be heard on your lips.
17 You shall not make cast idols.
18 You shall keep the festival of unleavened bread. For seven days you shall eat unleavened bread, as I commanded you, at the time appointed in the month of Abib; for in the month of Abib you came out from Egypt.	15a You shall observe the festival of unleavened bread; as I commanded you, you shall eat unleavened bread for seven days at the appointed time in the month of Abib, for in it you came out of Egypt.
19 All that first opens the womb is mine, all your male livestock, the firstborn of cow and sheep. 20a The firstborn of a donkey you shall redeem with a lamb, or if you will not redeem it you shall break its neck. All the firstborn of your sons you shall redeem.
20b No one shall appear before me empty-handed.	15b No one shall appear before me empty-handed.
21 For six days you shall work, but on the seventh day you shall rest; even in ploughing time and in harvest time you shall rest.	10 For six years you shall sow your land and gather in its yield; 11 but the seventh year you shall let it rest and lie fallow, so that the poor of your people may eat; and what they leave the wild animals may eat. You shall do the same with your vineyard, and with your olive orchard. 12 Six days you shall do your work, but on the seventh day you shall rest, so that your ox and your donkey may have relief, and your homeborn slave and the resident alien may be refreshed.
22 You shall observe the festival of weeks, the first fruits of wheat harvest, and the festival of ingathering at the turn of the year.	16 You shall observe the festival of harvest, of the first fruits of your labor, of what you sow in the field. You shall observe the festival of ingathering at the end of the year, when you gather in from the field the fruit of your labor.
23 Three times in the year all your males shall appear before the Lord God, the God of Israel. 24 For I will cast out nations before you, and enlarge your borders; no one shall covet your land when you go up to appear before the Lord your God three times in the year.	17 Three times in the year all your males shall appear before the Lord God.
25 You shall not offer the blood of my sacrifice with leaven, and the sacrifice of the festival of the passover shall not be left until the morning.	18 You shall not offer the blood of my sacrifice with anything leavened, or let the fat of my festival remain until the morning.
26 The best of the first fruits of your ground you shall bring to the house of the Lord your God. You shall not boil a kid in its mother's milk.	19 The choicest of the first fruits of your ground you shall bring into the house of the LORD your God. You shall not boil a kid in its mother's milk.

== Bibliography ==
- Aaron, David H. (2006). Etched in Stone: The Emergence of the Decalogue. Continuum International Publishing Group.
- Alexander, T. Desmond; David Weston Baker (2003). Dictionary of the Old Testament: Pentateuch. InterVarsity Pres.
- Coogan, Michael David; Marc Zvi Brettler; Carol A. Newsom, eds. (2007). The New Oxford Annotated Bible with the Apocrypha, Augmented Third Edition, New Revised Standard Version. Oxford University Press.
- Cross, Frank Leslie; Elizabeth A. Livingstone, eds. (1997). The Oxford Dictionary of the Christian Church (3rd ed.). Oxford University Press.
- Friedman, Richard Elliott (2003). Commentary on the Torah. HarperSanFrancisco.
- Ginsberg, H.L. (1982). The Israelian heritage of Judaism. Jewish Theological Seminary of America.
- Gottwald, Norman (2008). The Hebrew Bible: A Brief Socio-Literary Introduction. Fortress Press.
- Jackson, Bernard (2000). Studies in the semiotics of Biblical law. Continuum International Publishing Group.
- Levinson, Bernard M. (July 2002). "Goethe's Analysis of Exodus 34 and Its Influence on Julius Wellhausen: The Pfropfung of the Documentary Hypothesis". Zeitschrift für die Alttestamentliche Wissenschaft. 114 (2): 212–223. doi:10.1515/zatw.2002.011. ISSN 0044-2526.
- Mays, James Luther, ed. (1988). HarperCollins Bible Commentary. Society of Biblical Literature. HarperCollins.
- Ska, Jean Louis (2006). Introduction to reading the Pentateuch. Eisenbrauns.
- Whybray, R. Norman (1995). Introduction to the Pentateuch. Wm. B. Eerdmans Publishing.
