= Composition of the Torah =

The composition of the Torah (or Pentateuch, the first five books of the Hebrew Bible—Genesis, Exodus, Leviticus, Numbers, and Deuteronomy) was a process that is now widely believed to have involved multiple authors over an extended period of time.

Jewish tradition held that all five books were originally written by Moses in the 2nd millennium BCE, but since the 17th century modern scholars have rejected Mosaic authorship. The precise process by which the Torah was composed, the number of authors involved, and the date of each author's contribution remain hotly contested. Some scholars, such as Rolf Rendtorff, espouse a fragmentary hypothesis, in which the Pentateuch is seen as a compilation of short, independent narratives, which were gradually brought together into larger units in two editorial phases: the Deuteronomic and the Priestly phases. By contrast, scholars such as John Van Seters advocate a supplementary hypothesis, which posits that the Torah is the result of two major additions—Yahwist and Priestly—to an existing corpus of work. Other scholars, such as Richard Elliott Friedman or Joel S. Baden, support a revised version of the documentary hypothesis, holding that the Torah was composed by using four different sources—Yahwist, Elohist, Priestly, and Deuteronomist—that were combined into one in the Persian period in Yehud.

Scholars frequently use these newer hypotheses in combination, making it challenging to classify contemporary theories as strictly one or another. The general trend in recent scholarship is to recognize the final form of the Torah as a literary and ideological unity, based on earlier sources, was likely completed during the Persian period (539–333 BCE).

== Date of composition ==
Classical source criticism seeks to determine the date of a text by establishing an earliest possible date (terminus post quem) and a latest possible date (terminus ante quem) on the basis of external attestation of the text's existence, as well as the internal features of the text itself. On the basis of a variety of arguments, modern scholars generally see the completed Torah as a product of the time of the Persian Achaemenid Empire (probably 450–350 BCE), although some would place its composition in the Hellenistic period (333–164 BCE).

=== Manuscripts and non-biblical references ===
Concrete archaeological evidence bearing on the dating of the Torah is found in early manuscript fragments, such as those found among the Dead Sea Scrolls. The earliest extant manuscript fragments of the Pentateuch date to the late third or early second centuries BCE. In addition, early non-biblical sources, such as the Letter of Aristeas, indicate that the Torah was first translated into Greek in Alexandria under the reign of Ptolemy II Philadelphus (285–247 BCE). These lines of evidence indicate that the Torah must have been composed in its final form no later than c. 250 BCE, before its translation into Greek. or contemporaneously in both languages.

There is one external reference to the Torah which, depending on its attribution, may push the terminus ante quem for the composition of the Torah down to about 315 BCE. In Book 40 of Diodorus Siculus's Library, an ancient encyclopedia compiled from a variety of quotations from older documents, there is a passage that refers to a written Jewish law passed down from Moses. Scholars have traditionally attributed the passage to the late 4th-century Greek historian Hecataeus of Abdera, which, if correct, would imply that the Torah must have been composed in some form before 315 BCE. However, the attribution of this passage to Hecataeus has been challenged recently. Russell Gmirkin has argued that the passage is in fact a quote from Theophanes of Mytilene, a first-century BCE Roman biographer cited earlier in Book 40, who in turn used Hecataeus along with other sources. Lester Grabbe considers Gmirkin's arguments unconvincing. Yonatan Adler has disputed the validity of quotations citing Hecataeus, as Hecateus's original work is lost, and it is unclear what later authors specifically attribute to Hecataeus in their descriptions of Jewish practice.

=== Elephantine papyri ===
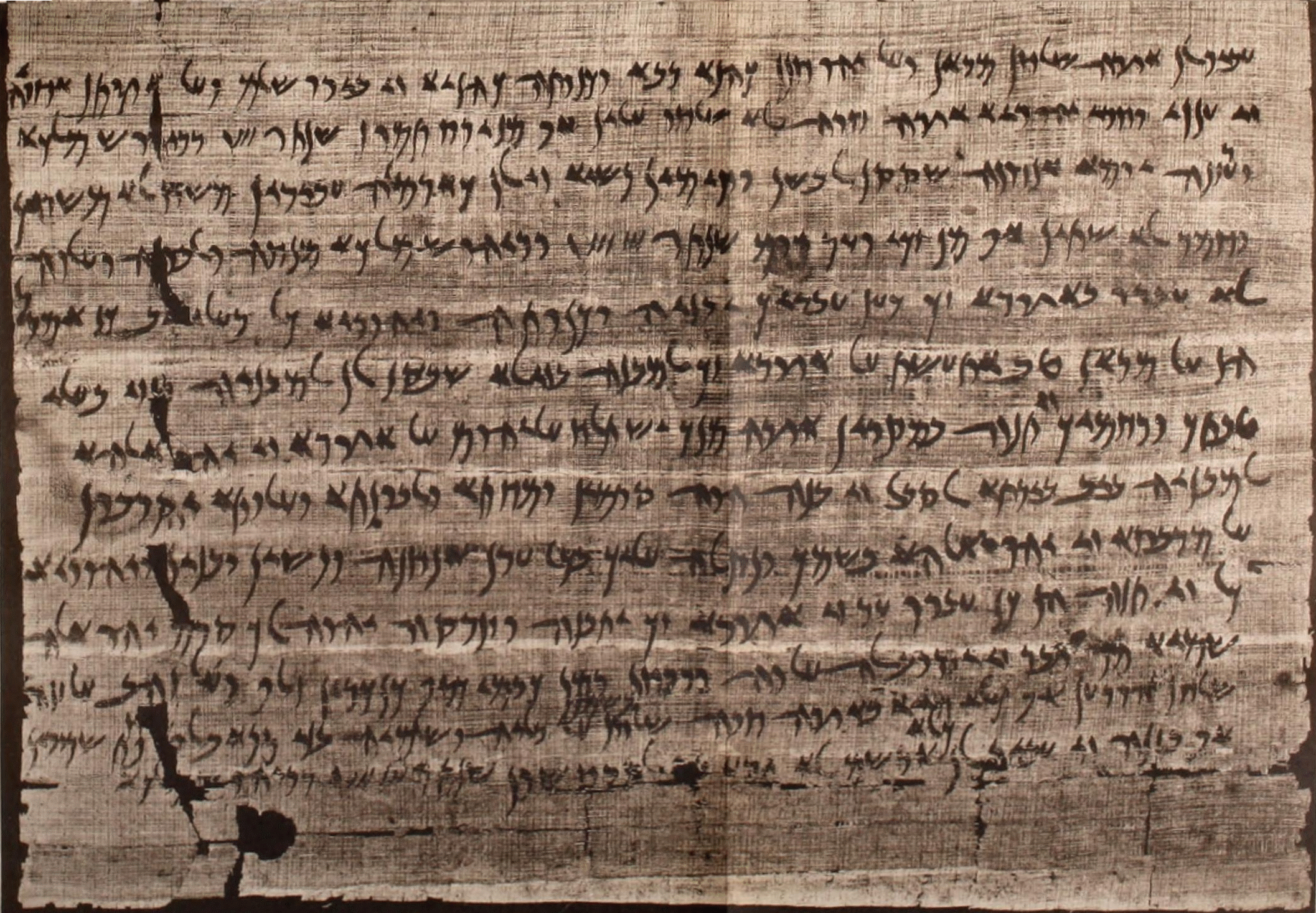
A letter from the Elephantine papyri, requesting the rebuilding of a Jewish temple at Elephantine.

The Elephantine papyri show clear evidence of the existence c. 400 BCE of a polytheistic Judean colony in Egypt who show no knowledge of a written Torah or the narratives described therein. The papyri also document the existence of a small Jewish temple at Elephantine, which possessed altars for incense offerings and animal sacrifices, as late as 411 BCE. Such a temple would be in clear violation of Deuteronomic law, which stipulates that no temple may be constructed outside of Jerusalem. Furthermore, the papyri show that the Jews at Elephantine sent letters to the high priest in Jerusalem asking for his support in rebuilding their local temple, which seems to suggest that the priests of the Second Temple were not enforcing Deuteronomic law at that time.

A minority of scholars such as Niels Peter Lemche, Philippe Wajdenbaum, Russell Gmirkin, and Thomas L. Thompson have argued that the Elephantine papyri demonstrate that monotheism and the Torah could not have been established in Jewish culture before 400 BCE, and that the Torah was therefore likely written in the Hellenistic period, in the third or fourth centuries BCE (see § Possibility of a Hellenistic origin). By contrast, most scholars explain this data by theorizing that the Elephantine Jews represented an isolated remnant of Jewish religious practices from earlier centuries, or that the Torah had only recently been promulgated at that time.

=== Ketef Hinnom scrolls ===
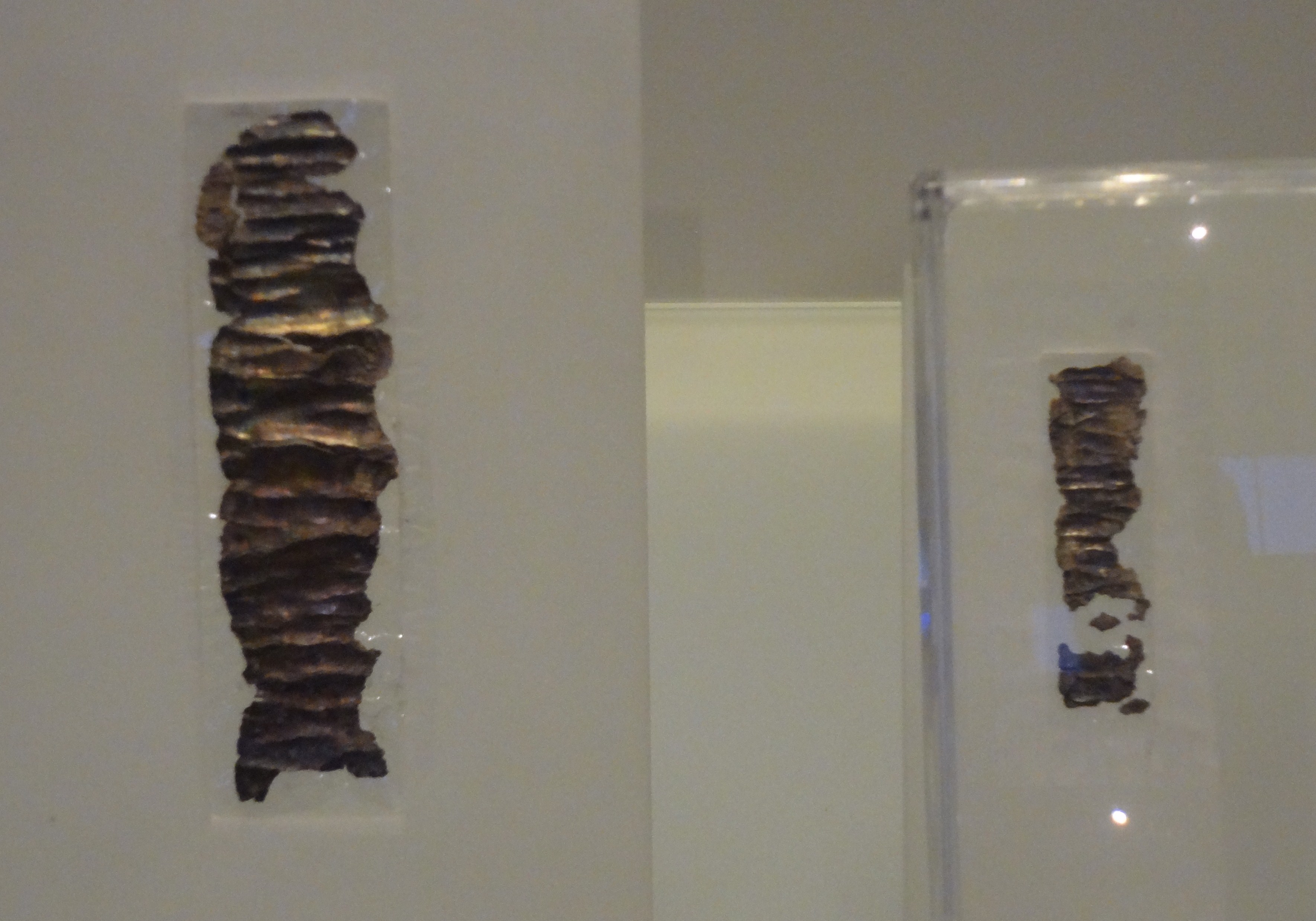
The two scrolls on display

In 1979, two silver scrolls were uncovered at Ketef Hinnom, an archaeological site southwest of the Old City of Jerusalem, which were found to contain a variation of the Priestly Blessing, found in Numbers 6:24–26. The scrolls were dated paleographically to the late 7th or early 6th century BCE, placing them at the end of the First Temple period. These scrolls cannot be accepted as evidence that the Pentateuch as a whole was composed before the 6th century, as it is widely accepted that the Torah draws on earlier oral and written sources and traditions, and there is no reference to a written Torah in the scrolls themselves.

=== Linguistic dating ===
Some scholars, such as Avi Hurvitz (see § Date of the Priestly source below), have attempted to date the various strata of the Pentateuch on the basis of the form of the Hebrew language that is used. It is generally agreed that Classical Hebrew and Late Biblical Hebrew had distinctive, identifiable features and that Classical Hebrew was earlier. Classical Hebrew is usually dated to the period before the Babylonian captivity (597–539 BCE), while Late Biblical Hebrew is generally dated to the exilic and post-exilic periods. However, it is difficult to determine precisely when Classical Hebrew ceased being used, since there are no extant Hebrew inscriptions of substantial length dating from the relevant period (c. 550–200 BCE). Scholars also disagree about the variety of Hebrew to which the various strata should be assigned. For example, Hurvitz classifies the Priestly material as belonging to Classical Hebrew, while Joseph Blenkinsopp and most other scholars disagree.

Another methodological difficulty with linguistic dating is that it is known that the biblical authors often intentionally used archaisms for stylistic effects, sometimes mixing them with words and constructions from later periods. This means that the presence of archaic language in a text cannot be considered definitive proof that the text dates to an early period. Ian Young and Martin Ehrensvärd maintain that even some texts that were certainly written during the post-exilic period, such as the Book of Haggai, lack features distinctive of Late Biblical Hebrew. Conversely, the Book of Ezekiel, written during the Babylonian exile, contains many features of Late Biblical Hebrew. Summing up these problems, Young has argued that "none of the linguistic criteria used to date [biblical] texts either early or late is strong enough to compel scholars to reconsider an argument made on non-linguistic grounds." However, this position has been rejected by other scholars, such as Ronald Hendel and Jan Joosten, who criticize that Young and others exclusively use the Masoretic text of the Hebrew Bible to carry out their linguistic analysis of the biblical texts, apart from undertaking other errors in the fields of textual criticism and historical linguistics.

For their part, Ronald Hendel and Jan Joosten hold that the Hebrew contained in the Genesis–2 Kings saga corresponds to the Classical Hebrew of the pre-exilic period, which is supported by the linguistic correspondence with the Hebrew inscriptions of that period (mainly from the 8th and 7th centuries BC), so that they consequently date the composition of the main sources of the Torah to the period of Neo-Assyrian hegemony. Hebraist Aaron D. Hornkohl argues that the Classical Hebrew in which the Pentateuch is written is older than that of other pre-exilic biblical books (such as the pre-exilic prophetic books) and may contain features dating to the pre-monarchic period of ancient Israel.

=== Historiographical dating ===
Many scholars assign dates to the Pentateuchal sources by comparing the theology and priorities of each author to a theoretical reconstruction of the history of Israelite religion. This method often involves provisionally accepting some narrative in the Hebrew Bible as attesting to a real historical event, and situating the composition of a source relative to that event.

For example, the Deuteronomist source is widely associated with the staunchly monotheistic, centralizing religious reforms of King Josiah in the late 7th century BCE, as described in 2 Kings. Starting with Julius Wellhausen, many scholars have identified the "Book of the Law" discovered by Josiah's high priest Hilkiah in 2 Kings 22–23 with the Book of Deuteronomy, or an early version thereof, and posited that it was in fact written by Hilkiah at that time. Authors such as John Van Seters therefore date the D source to the late 7th century. Similarly, many scholars associate the Priestly source with the Book of the Law brought to the people of Israel by Ezra upon his return from exile in Babylonia in 458 BCE, as described in Nehemiah 8–10. P is therefore widely dated to the 5th century, during the Persian period.

This method has been criticized by some scholars, however, especially those associated with the minimalist school of biblical criticism. These critics stress that the historicity of the Josiah and Ezra narratives cannot be independently established outside the Hebrew Bible, and that archaeological evidence generally does not support the occurrence of a radical centralizing religious reform in the 7th century as described in 2 Kings. They conclude that dating Pentateuchal sources on the basis of historically dubious or uncertain events is inherently speculative and inadvisable.

=== Arguments for a Persian origin ===
In the influential book In Search of 'Ancient Israel': A Study in Biblical Origins, Philip Davies argued that the Torah was likely promulgated in its final form during the Persian period, when the Judean people were governed under the Yehud Medinata province of the Achaemenid Empire. Davies points out that the Persian empire had a general policy of establishing national law codes and consciously creating an ethnic identity among its conquered peoples in order to legitimate its rule, and concludes that this is the most likely historical context in which the Torah could have been published. Franz Greifenhagen concurs with this view, and notes that most recent studies support a Persian date for the final redaction of the Pentateuch. Since the Elephantine papyri seem to show that the Torah was not yet fully entrenched in Jewish culture by 400 BCE, Greifenhagen proposes that the late Persian period (450–350 BCE) is most likely.

Louis C. Jonker argues a connection between Darius I's DNb inscription and the Pentateuch, particularly the Holiness Legislation.

=== Possibility of a Hellenistic origin ===
The idea that the Torah may have been written during the Hellenistic period, after the conquests of Alexander the Great, was first seriously proposed in 1993, when the biblical scholar Niels Peter Lemche published an article titled The Old Testament – A Hellenistic Book? Since then, a growing number of scholars, especially those associated with the Copenhagen School, have put forward various arguments for a Hellenistic origin of the Pentateuch.

Notably, in 2006, the independent scholar Russell Gmirkin published a book titled Berossus and Genesis, Manetho and Exodus, in which he argued that the Pentateuch relied on the Greek-language histories of Berossus (278 BCE) and Manetho (285–280 BCE) and therefore must have been composed subsequently to both of them. Gmirkin further argued that the Torah was likely written at the Library of Alexandria in 273–272 BCE, by the same group of Jewish scholars who translated the Torah into Greek around the same time. While Gmirkin accepts the conventional stratification of the Pentateuch into sources such as J, D, and P, he believes that they are best understood as reflecting the different social strata and beliefs of the Alexandrian authors, rather than as independent writers separated by long periods of time.

In 2016, Gmirkin published a second book, Plato and the Creation of the Hebrew Bible, in which he argued that the law code found in the Torah was heavily influenced by Greek laws, and especially the theoretical law code espoused by Plato in his Laws. He further argued that Plato's Laws provided the biblical authors with a basic blueprint for how to transform Jewish society: by creating an authoritative canon of laws and associated literature, drawing on earlier traditions, and presenting them as being divinely inspired and very ancient. Philippe Wajdenbaum has recently argued for a similar conclusion.

==== Criticism of Hellenistic origin theories ====
John Van Seters criticized Gmirkin's work in a 2007 book review, arguing that Berossus and Genesis engages in a straw man fallacy by attacking the documentary hypothesis without seriously addressing more recent theories of Pentateuchal origins. He also alleges that Gmirkin selectively points to parallels between Genesis and Berossus, and Exodus and Manetho, while ignoring major dissimilarities between the accounts. Finally, Van Seters points out that Gmirkin does not seriously consider the numerous allusions to the Genesis and Exodus narratives in the rest of the Hebrew Bible, including in texts that are generally dated much earlier than his proposed dating of the Pentateuch. Gmirkin, by contrast, holds that those parts of the Hebrew Bible that allude to Genesis and Exodus must be dated later than is commonly assumed.

== Nature and extent of the sources ==
Virtually all scholars agree that the Torah is composed of material from multiple different authors, or sources. The three most commonly recognized are the Priestly (P), Deuteronomist (D), and Yahwist (J) sources.

=== Priestly ===
The Priestly source is perhaps the most widely accepted source category in Pentateuchal studies, because it is both stylistically and theologically distinct from other material in the Torah. It includes a set of claims that are contradicted by non-Priestly passages and therefore uniquely characteristic: no sacrifice before the institution is ordained by Yahweh (God) at Sinai, the exalted status of Aaron and the priesthood, and the use of the divine title El Shaddai before God reveals his name to Moses, to name a few. In general, the Priestly work is concerned with priestly matters—ritual law, the origins of shrines and rituals, and genealogies—all expressed in a formal, repetitive style. It stresses the rules and rituals of worship, and the crucial role of priests, expanding considerably on the role given to Aaron (all Levites are priests, but according to P only the descendants of Aaron were to be allowed to officiate in the inner sanctuary).

P's God is majestic, and transcendent, and all things happen because of his power and will. He reveals himself in stages, first as Elohim (a Hebrew word meaning simply "god", taken from the earlier Canaanite word meaning "the gods"), then to Abraham as El Shaddai (usually translated as "God Almighty"), and finally to Moses by his unique name, Yahweh. P divides history into four epochs from Creation to Moses by means of covenants between God and Noah, Abraham and Moses. The Israelites are God's chosen people, his relationship with them is governed by the covenants, and P's God is concerned that Israel should preserve its identity by avoiding intermarriage with non-Israelites. P is deeply concerned with "holiness", meaning the ritual purity of the people and the land: Israel is to be "a priestly kingdom and a holy nation" (Exodus 19:6), and P's elaborate rules and rituals are aimed at creating and preserving holiness.

The Priestly source is responsible for the entire Book of Leviticus, for the first of the two creation stories in Genesis (Genesis 1), for Adam's genealogy, part of the Flood story, the Table of Nations, and the genealogy of Shem (i.e., Abraham's ancestry). Most of the remainder of Genesis is from the Yahwist, but P provides the covenant with Abraham (chapter 17) and a few other stories concerning Abraham, Isaac and Jacob. The Book of Exodus is also divided between the Yahwist and P, and the usual understanding is that the Priestly writers were adding to an already-existing Yahwist narrative. P was responsible for chapters 25–31 and 35–40, the instructions for making the Tabernacle and the story of its fabrication.

While the classical documentary hypothesis posited that the Priestly material constituted an independent document which was compiled into the Pentateuch by a later redactor, most contemporary scholars now view P as a redactional layer, or commentary, on the Yahwistic and Deuteronomistic sources. Unlike J and D, the Priestly material does not seem to amount to an independent narrative when considered on its own.

==== Date of the Priestly source ====
While most scholars consider P to be one of the latest strata of the Pentateuch, post-dating both J and D, since the 1970s a number of Jewish scholars have challenged this assumption, arguing for an early dating of the Priestly material. Avi Hurvitz, for example, has forcefully argued on linguistic grounds that P represents an earlier form of the Hebrew language than what is found in both Ezekiel and Deuteronomy, and therefore pre-dates both of them. These scholars often claim that the late-dating of P is due in large part to a Protestant bias in biblical studies which assumes that "priestly" and "ritualistic" material must represent a late degeneration of an earlier, "purer" faith. Such arguments however have not convinced the majority of scholars.

=== Deuteronomist ===
The Deuteronomist source is responsible for the core chapters (12–26) of Book of Deuteronomy, containing the Deuteronomic Code, and its composition is generally dated between the 7th and 5th centuries BCE. More specifically, most scholars believe that D was composed during the late monarchic period, around the time of King Josiah, although some scholars have argued for other dates, such as during the reign of Manasseh (687–643 BCE) or during the exilic (597–539 BCE) and postexilic periods (539–332 BCE).

The Deuteronomist conceives of a covenant between the Israelites and their god Yahweh, who has chosen ("elected") the Israelites as his people, and requires Israel to live according to his law. Israel is to be a theocracy with Yahweh as the divine suzerain. The law is to be supreme over all other sources of authority, including kings and royal officials, and the prophets are the guardians of the law: prophecy is instruction in the law as given through Moses, the law given through Moses is the complete and sufficient revelation of the Will of God, and nothing further is needed.

Importantly, unlike the Yahwist source, Deuteronomy insists on the centralization of worship "in the place that the Lord your God will choose." Deuteronomy never says where this place will be, but Kings makes it clear that it is Jerusalem.

=== Yahwist ===
John Van Seters characterizes the Yahwist writer as a "historian of Israelite origins," writing during the Babylonian exile (597–539 BCE). The Yahwist narrative begins with the second creation story at Genesis 2:4. This is followed by the Garden of Eden story, Cain and Abel, Cain's descendants (but Adam's descendants are from P), a Flood story (tightly intertwined with a parallel account from P), Noah's descendants and the Tower of Babel. These chapters make up the so-called Primeval history, the story of mankind prior to Abraham, and J and P provide roughly equal amounts of material. The Yahwist provides the bulk of the remainder of Genesis, including the patriarchal narratives concerning Abraham, Isaac, Jacob and Joseph.

The Book of Exodus belongs in large part to the Yahwist, although it also contains significant Priestly interpolations. The Book of Numbers also contains a substantial amount of Yahwist material, starting with Numbers 10–14. It includes, among other pericopes, the departure from Sinai, the story of the spies who are afraid of the giants in Canaan, and the refusal of the Israelites to enter the Promised Land – which then brings on the wrath of Yahweh, who condemns them to wander in the wilderness for the next forty years.

==== Criticism of the Yahwist as a category ====
The Yahwist is perhaps the most controversial source in contemporary Pentateuchal studies, with a number of scholars, especially in Europe, denying its existence altogether. A growing number of scholars have concluded that Genesis, a book traditionally assigned primarily to the Yahwist, was originally composed separately from Exodus and Numbers, and was joined to these books later by a Priestly redactor. Nevertheless, the existence and integrity of the Yahwist material still has many defenders; especially fervent among them is John Van Seters.

== History of scholarship ==
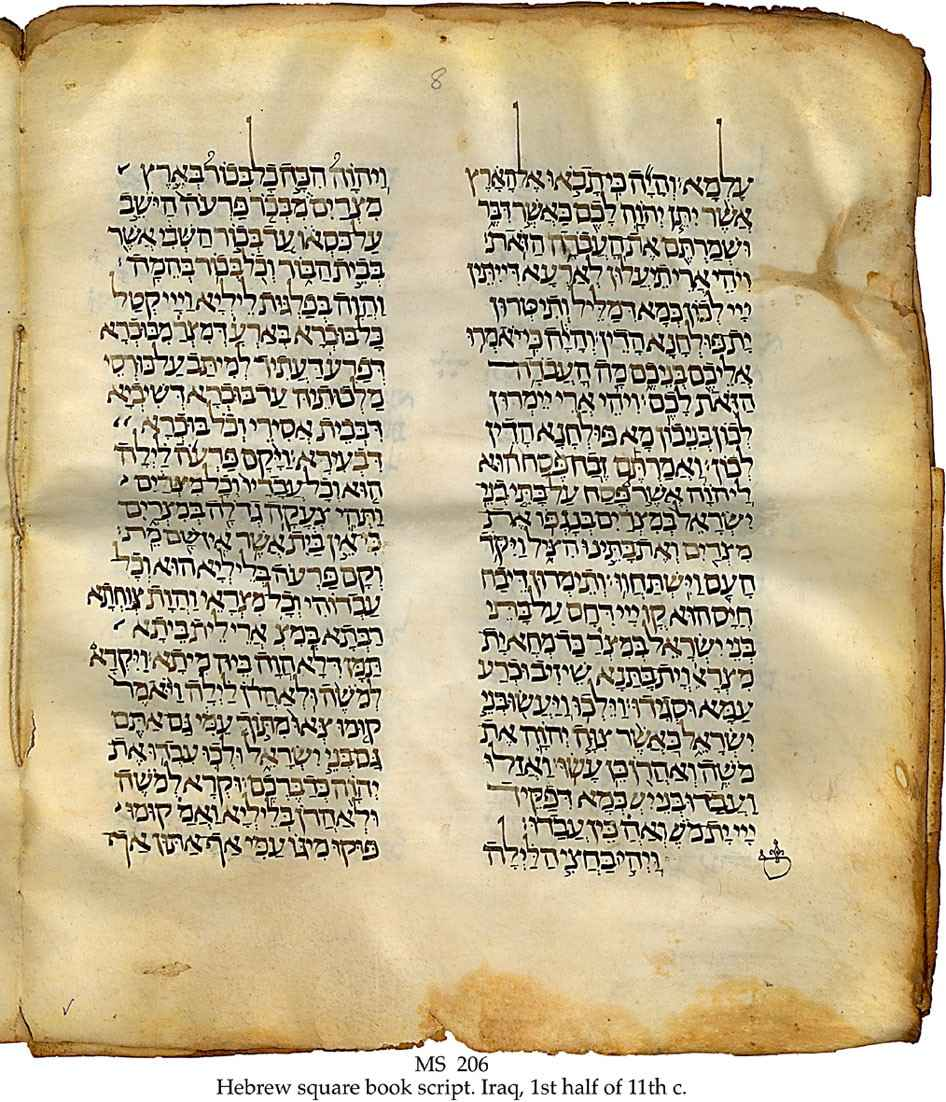
11th century manuscript of the Hebrew Bible.

In the mid-18th century, some scholars started a critical study of doublets (parallel accounts of the same incidents), inconsistencies, and changes in style and vocabulary in the Torah. In 1780 Johann Eichhorn, building on the work of the French doctor and exegete Jean Astruc's "Conjectures" and others, formulated the "older documentary hypothesis": the idea that Genesis was composed by combining two identifiable sources, the Jehovist ("J"; also called the Yahwist) and the Elohist ("E"). These sources were subsequently found to run through the first four books of the Torah, and the number was later expanded to three when Wilhelm de Wette identified the Deuteronomist as an additional source found only in Deuteronomy ("D"). Later still the Elohist was split into Elohist and Priestly ("P") sources, increasing the number to four.

These documentary approaches were in competition with two other models, the fragmentary and the supplementary. The fragmentary hypothesis argued that fragments of varying lengths, rather than continuous documents, lay behind the Torah; this approach accounted for the Torah's diversity but could not account for its structural consistency, particularly regarding chronology. The supplementary hypothesis was better able to explain this unity: it maintained that the Torah was made up of a central core document, the Elohist, supplemented by fragments taken from many sources. The supplementary approach was dominant by the early 1860s, but it was challenged by an important book published by Hermann Hupfeld in 1853, who argued that the Pentateuch was made up of four documentary sources, the Priestly, Yahwist, and Elohist intertwined in Genesis-Exodus-Leviticus-Numbers, and the stand-alone source of Deuteronomy. At around the same period Karl Heinrich Graf argued that the Yahwist and Elohist were the earliest sources and the Priestly source the latest, while Wilhelm Vatke linked the four to an evolutionary framework, the Yahwist and Elohist to a time of primitive nature and fertility cults, the Deuteronomist to the ethical religion of the Hebrew prophets, and the Priestly source to a form of religion dominated by ritual, sacrifice and law.

=== Wellhausen and the new documentary hypothesis ===
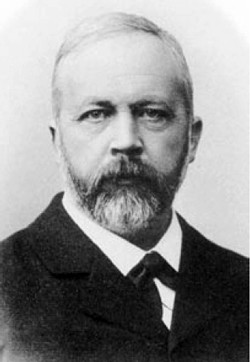
Julius Wellhausen

In 1878 Julius Wellhausen published Geschichte Israels, Bd 1 ("History of Israel, Vol 1"); the second edition he printed as Prolegomena zur Geschichte Israels ("Prolegomena to the History of Israel"), in 1883, and the work is better known under that name. (The second volume, a synthetic history titled Israelitische und jüdische Geschichte ["Israelite and Jewish History"], did not appear until 1894 and remains untranslated.) Crucially, this historical portrait was based upon two earlier works of his technical analysis: "Die Composition des Hexateuchs" ("The Composition of the Hexateuch") of 1876/77 and sections on the "historical books" (Judges–Kings) in his 1878 edition of Friedrich Bleek's Einleitung in das Alte Testament ("Introduction to the Old Testament").

Diagram of the 20th century documentary hypothesis.: J: Yahwist (10th–9th century BCE); E: Elohist (9th century BCE); Dtr1: early (7th century BCE) Deuteronomist historian; Dtr2: later (6th century BCE) Deuteronomist historian; P*: Priestly (6th–5th century BCE); D†: Deuteronomist; R: redactor; DH: Deuteronomistic history (books of Joshua, Judges, Samuel, Kings)

Wellhausen's documentary hypothesis owed little to Wellhausen himself but was mainly the work of Hupfeld, Eduard Eugène Reuss, Graf, and others, who in turn had built on earlier scholarship. He accepted Hupfeld's four sources and, in agreement with Graf, placed the Priestly work last. J was the earliest document, a product of the 10th century BCE and the court of Solomon; E was from the 9th century in the northern Kingdom of Israel, and had been combined by a redactor (editor) with J to form a document JE; D, the third source, was a product of the 7th century BCE, by 620 BCE, during the reign of King Josiah; P (what Wellhausen first named "Q") was a product of the priest-and-temple dominated world of the 6th century; and the final redaction, when P was combined with JED to produce the Torah as we now know it.

Wellhausen's explanation of the formation of the Torah was also an explanation of the religious history of Israel. The Yahwist and Elohist described a primitive, spontaneous and personal world, in keeping with the earliest stage of Israel's history; in Deuteronomy he saw the influence of the prophets and the development of an ethical outlook, which he felt represented the pinnacle of Jewish religion; and the Priestly source reflected the rigid, ritualistic world of the priest-dominated post-exilic period. His work, notable for its detailed and wide-ranging scholarship and close argument, entrenched the "new documentary hypothesis" as the dominant explanation of Pentateuchal origins from the late 19th to the late 20th centuries. (Note: The two-source hypothesis of Eichorn was the "older" documentary hypothesis, and the four-source hypothesis adopted by Wellhausen was the "newer".)

=== Collapse of the documentary consensus ===
The consensus around the documentary hypothesis collapsed in the last decades of the 20th century. Three major publications of the 1970s caused scholars to seriously question the assumptions of the documentary hypothesis: Abraham in History and Tradition by John Van Seters, Der sogenannte Jahwist ("The So-Called Yahwist") by Hans Heinrich Schmid, and Das überlieferungsgeschichtliche Problem des Pentateuch ("The Tradition-Historical Problem of the Pentateuch") by Rolf Rendtorff. These three authors shared many of the same criticisms of the documentary hypothesis, but were not in agreement about what paradigm ought to replace it.

Van Seters and Schmid both forcefully argued, to the satisfaction of most scholars, that the Yahwist source could not be dated to the Solomonic period (c. 950 BCE) as posited by the documentary hypothesis. They instead dated it to the period of the Babylonian captivity (597–539 BCE), or the late monarchic period at the earliest. Van Seters also sharply criticized the idea of a substantial Elohist source, arguing that E extends at most to two short passages in Genesis. This view has now been accepted by the vast majority of scholars.

Some scholars, following Rendtorff, have come to espouse a fragmentary hypothesis, in which the Pentateuch is seen as a compilation of short, independent narratives, which were gradually brought together into larger units in two editorial phases: the Deuteronomic and the Priestly phases. By contrast, scholars such as John Van Seters advocate a supplementary hypothesis, which posits that the Torah is the result of two major additions—Yahwist and Priestly—to an existing corpus of work.

Scholars frequently use these newer hypotheses in combination with each other and with a documentary model, making it difficult to classify contemporary theories as strictly one or another. The majority of scholars today continue to recognise Deuteronomy as a source, with its origin in the law-code produced at the court of Josiah as described by De Wette, subsequently given a frame during the exile (the speeches and descriptions at the front and back of the code) to identify it as the words of Moses. Most scholars also agree that some form of Priestly source existed, although its extent, especially its end-point, is uncertain. The remainder is called collectively non-Priestly, a grouping which includes both pre-Priestly and post-Priestly material.

The general trend in recent scholarship is to recognize the final form of the Torah as a literary and ideological unity, based on earlier sources, likely completed during the Persian period (539–333 BCE). Some scholars would place its final compilation much later, in the Hellenistic period (333–164 BCE).

== Contemporary models ==
The table is based on that in Walter Houston's "The Pentateuch", with expansions as indicated. Note that the three hypotheses are not mutually exclusive.

Hypothesis	Method of composition	Agency (redactor/collector/author)	Mode of analysis	Strengths and weaknesses
Documentary	A small number of continuous documents (traditionally four) combined to form one continuous final text.	Combined by editors who altered as little as possible of the texts available to them.	Source criticism	Explains both the unity of the Torah (due to the unity of the constituent documents) and its diversity (due to disagreements/repetitions between them). Difficulty distinguishing J from E outside Genesis. Greatest weakness is the role of the redactors (editors), who seem to function as a deus ex machina to explain away difficulties.
Supplementary	Produced by the successive addition of layers of supplementary material to a core text or group of texts.	Editors are also authors, creating original narrative and interpretation.	Redaction criticism	Accounts for the structural consistency of the Pentateuch better than the fragmentary approach, the central core explaining its unity of theme and structure, the fragments embedded in this its diversity of language and style.
Fragmentary	The combination of a large number of short texts.	Editors also create linking narrative.	Form criticism	Has difficulty accounting for the structural consistency of the Pentateuch, especially its chronology.

=== Neo-documentary hypothesis ===
A revised neo-documentary hypothesis still has adherents, especially in North America and Israel. This distinguishes sources by means of plot and continuity rather than stylistic and linguistic concerns, and does not tie them to stages in the evolution of Israel's religious history. Its resurrection of an E source is probably the element most often criticised by other scholars, as it is rarely distinguishable from the classical J source, and European scholars have largely rejected it as fragmentary or non-existent.

=== Supplementary hypothesis ===
* / Independent document, c. 620 BCE.; ^{**} / Response to D, c. 540 BCE.; ^{***} / Largely a redactor of J, c. 400 BCE.

The modern supplementary hypothesis came to a head in the 1970s with the publication of works by John Van Seters and Hans Heinrich Schmid. Van Seters' summation of the hypothesis accepts "three sources or literary strata within the Pentateuch," which have come to be known as the Deuteronomist (D), the Yahwist (J), and the Priestly Writer (P). Van Seters ordered the sources chronologically as DJP.

- the Deuteronomist source (D) was likely written c. 620 BCE.
- the Yahwist source (J) was likely written c. 540 BCE in the exilic period.
- the Priestly source (P) was likely written c. 400 BCE in the post-exilic period.

The supplementary hypothesis denies the existence of an extensive Elohist (E) source, one of the four independent sources described in the documentary hypothesis. Instead, it describes the Yahwist as having borrowed from an array of written and oral traditions, combining them into the J source. It proposes that because J is compiled from many earlier traditions and stories, documentarians mistook the compilation as having multiple authors: the Yahwist (J) and the Elohist (E). Instead, the supplementary hypothesis proposes that what documentarians considered J and E are in fact a single source (some use J, some use JE), likely written in the 6th century BCE.

Notably, in contrast to the traditional documentary hypothesis, the supplementary hypothesis proposes that the Deuteronomist (D) was the earliest Pentateuchal author, writing at the end of the seventh century.

=== Fragmentary hypothesis ===
The fragmentary or block-composition approach views the Torah as a compilation of a large number of short, originally independent narratives. On this view, broad categories such as the Yahwist, Priestly, and Deuteronomist sources are insufficient to account for the diversity found in the Torah, and are rejected. In place of source criticism, the method of form criticism is used to trace the origin of the various traditions found in the Pentateuch. Fragmentarians differ, however, in how they believe these traditions were transmitted over time. Mid-twentieth century scholars like Gerhard von Rad and Martin Noth argued that the transmission of Pentateuchal narratives occurred primarily through oral tradition. More recent work in the fragmentary school, such as that of Rolf Rendtorff and especially Erhardt Blum, has replaced the model of oral transmission with one of literary composition.

== See also ==
- Authorship of the Bible
- Biblical criticism
- Books of the Bible
- Dating the Bible
- Mosaic authorship

== Bibliography ==
- Aaron, David H. (2006). Etched in Stone: The Emergence of the Decalogue. New York: T&T clark.
- Baden, Joel S. (2012). The Composition of the Pentateuch: Renewing the Documentary Hypothesis. Anchor Yale Reference Library. Yale University Press. ISBN 978-0300152647.
- Baden, Joel S. (2009). J, E, and the redaction of the Pentateuch. Mohr Siebeck. ISBN 9783161499302.
- Bandstra, Barry L (2009). Reading the Old Testament: an introduction to the Hebrew Bible. Wadsworth. ISBN 978-0495391050.
- Barkay, Gabriel; et al. (2003). "The Challenges of Ketef Hinnom: Using Advanced Technologies to Recover the Earliest Biblical Texts and their Context". Near Eastern Archaeology. 66 (4): 162–171. doi:10.2307/3557916. JSTOR 3557916. S2CID 164042223.
- Barton, John (2014). "Biblical Scholarship on the European Continent, in the UK, and Ireland". In Saeboe, Magne; Ska, Jean Louis; Machinist, Peter (eds.). Hebrew Bible/Old Testament. III: From Modernism to Post-Modernism. Part II: The Twentieth Century – From Modernism to Post-Modernism. Vandenhoeck & Ruprecht. ISBN 978-3-525-54022-0.
- Barton, John; Muddiman, John (2010). The Pentateuch. Oxford University Press. ISBN 978-0-19-958024-8.
- Berlin, Adele (1994). Poetics and Interpretation of Biblical Narrative. Eisenbrauns. ISBN 978-1-57506-002-6.
- Block, Daniel I. (2005). "Deuteronomy". In Kevin J. Vanhoozer (ed.). Dictionary for Theological Interpretation of the Bible. Baker Academic. ISBN 9780801026942.
- Brueggemann, Walter (2002). Reverberations of faith: a theological handbook of Old Testament themes. Westminster John Knox. ISBN 9780664222314.
- Carr, David M. (2007). "Genesis". In Coogan, Michael David; Brettler, Marc Zvi; Newsom, Carol Ann (eds.). The New Oxford Annotated Bible with the Apocryphal/Deuterocanonical Books. Oxford University Press. ISBN 978-0-19-528880-3.
- Carr, David M. (2014). "Changes in Pentateuchal Criticism". In Saeboe, Magne; Ska, Jean Louis; Machinist, Peter (eds.). Hebrew Bible/Old Testament. III: From Modernism to Post-Modernism. Part II: The Twentieth Century – From Modernism to Post-Modernism. Vandenhoeck & Ruprecht. ISBN 978-3-525-54022-0.
- Cowley, Arthur (2005). Aramaic Papyri of the Fifth Century B.C. Eugene, OR: Wipf & Stock Publishers. pp. xx–xxiii. ISBN 1-59752-3631.
- Davies, Philip R. (2015). In Search of 'Ancient Israel': A Study in Biblical Origins (2nd ed.). New York: Bloomsbury T&T Clark. ISBN 978-0-56766-299-6.
- Davies, Philip R. (2013). Rethinking Biblical Scholarship. Changing Perspectives. Vol. 4. New York: Routledge. ISBN 978-1-84465-727-8.
- Gilbert, Christopher (2009). A Complete Introduction to the Bible. Paulist Press. ISBN 9780809145522.
- Frei, Peter (2001). "Persian Imperial Authorization: A Summary". In Watts, James (ed.). Persia and Torah: The Theory of Imperial Authorization of the Pentateuch. Atlanta, GA: SBL Press. p. 6. ISBN 9781589830158.
- Fried, Lisebeth S. (2002). "The High Places (Bāmôt) and the Reforms of Hezekiah and Josiah: An Archaeological Investigation". Journal of the American Oriental Society. 122 (3): 437–465. doi:10.2307/3087515. JSTOR 3087515.
- Friedman, Richard Elliott (1997). Who Wrote the Bible?. HarperOne.
- Gaines, Jason M.H. (2015). The Poetic Priestly Source. Fortress Press. ISBN 978-1-5064-0046-4.
- Gmirkin, Russell (2006). Berossus and Genesis, Manetho and Exodus. Bloomsbury. ISBN 978-0-567-13439-4.
- Gmirkin, Russell (2016). Plato and the Creation of the Hebrew Bible. Copenhagen International Seminar. Routledge. ISBN 978-1-138-68498-0.
- Gmirkin, Russell (11 December 2016). "Interview with Russell Gmirkin: What Does Plato Have To Do With the Bible?" (Interview). Signs of the Times.net.
- Greifenhagen, Franz V. (2003). Egypt on the Pentateuch's Ideological Map. Bloomsbury. ISBN 978-0-567-39136-0.
- Hendel, Ronald; Joosten, Jan (2018). How Old Is the Hebrew Bible?: A Linguistic, Textual, and Historical Study. Yale University Press. ISBN 978-0-300-23488-6.
- Hornkohl, Aaron D. (2024). Diachronic Diversity in Classical Biblical Hebrew. Cambridge Semitic Languages and Cultures. Vol. 29. Cambridge: Open Book Publishers. ISBN 978-1-80511-437-6.
- Houston, Walter (2013). The Pentateuch. SCM Press. ISBN 978-0-334-04385-0.
- Hurvitz, Avi (1982). A linguistic study of the relationship between the Priestly source and the book of Ezekiel: a new approach to an old problem. Cahiers de la Révue Biblique. Vol. 20. Paris: J. Gabalda.
- Hurvitz, Avi (2000). "Once Again: The Linguistic Profile of the Priestly Material in the Pentateuch and its Historical Age. A Response to J. Blenkinsopp". Zeitschrift für die Alttestamentliche Wissenschaft. 112 (2): 180–191. doi:10.1515/zatw.2000.112.2.180. S2CID 170948951.
- Kugel, James L. (2008). How to Read the Bible: A Guide to Scripture, Then and Now. FreePress. ISBN 978-0-7432-3587-7.
- Kugler, Robert; Hartin, Patrick (2009). An Introduction to the Bible. Eerdmans. ISBN 9780802846365.
- Lemche, Niels Peter (1993). "The Old Testament – a Hellenistic Book?". Scandinavian Journal of the Old Testament. 7 (2): 163–193. doi:10.1080/09018329308585016.
- Levin, Christoph (2013). Re-Reading the Scriptures. Mohr Siebeck. ISBN 978-3-16-152207-9.
- McKenzie, Steven L. (2000). Covenant. Chalice Press. ISBN 9780827205888.
- Meyers, Carol (2005). Exodus. Cambridge University Press. ISBN 9780521002912.
- Moore, Megan Bishop; Kelle, Brad E. (2011). Biblical History and Israel's Past. Eerdmans. ISBN 9780802862600.
- Newsom, Carol Ann (2004). The Self as Symbolic Space: Constructing Identity and Community at Qumran. Brill. ISBN 9789004138032.
- Otto, Eckart (2014). "The Study of Law and Ethics in the Hebrew Bible/Old Testament". In Saeboe, Magne; Ska, Jean Louis; Machinist, Peter (eds.). Hebrew Bible/Old Testament. III: From Modernism to Post-Modernism. Part II: The Twentieth Century – From Modernism to Post-Modernism. Vandenhoeck & Ruprecht. ISBN 978-3-525-54022-0.
- Patrick, Dale (2013). Deuteronomy. Chalice Press. ISBN 978-0-8272-0566-6.
- Patzia, Arthur G.; Petrotta, Anthony J. (2010). Pocket Dictionary of Biblical Studies. InterVarsity Press. ISBN 978-0-8308-6702-8.
- Römer, Thomas Christian (2006). "The Elusive Yahwist: A Short History of Research". In Dozeman, Thomas B.; Schmid, Konrad (eds.). A Farewell to the Yahwist?: The Composition of the Pentateuch in Recent European Interpretation. ISBN 978-1-58983-163-6.
- Ruddick, Eddie L. (1990). "Elohist". In Mills, Watson E.; Bullard, Roger Aubrey (eds.). Mercer Dictionary of the Bible. Mercer University Press. ISBN 978-0-86554-373-7.
- Ska, Jean-Louis (2006). Introduction to reading the Pentateuch. Eisenbrauns. ISBN 9781575061221.
- Ska, Jean Louis (2014). "Questions of the 'History of Israel' in Recent Research". In Saeboe, Magne; Ska, Jean Louis; Machinist, Peter (eds.). Hebrew Bible/Old Testament. III: From Modernism to Post-Modernism. Part II: The Twentieth Century – From Modernism to Post-Modernism. Vandenhoeck & Ruprecht. ISBN 978-3-525-54022-0.
- Stackert, Jeffrey (2022). Deuteronomy and the Pentateuch. Anchor Yale Reference Library. Yale University Press. ISBN 978-0-300-16751-1.
- Thompson, Thomas L. (2000). Early History of the Israelite People: From the Written & Archaeological Sources. BRILL. ISBN 9004119434.
- Van Seters, John (1998). "The Pentateuch". In Steven L. McKenzie; Matt Patrick Graham (eds.). The Hebrew Bible Today: An Introduction to Critical Issues. Westminster John Knox Press. ISBN 9780664256524.
- Van Seters, John (2007). "Berossus and Genesis, Manetho and Exodus: Hellenistic Histories and the Date of the Pentateuch. By Russell E. Gmirkin". The Journal of Theological Studies. 59 (1): 212–214. doi:10.1093/jts/flm136.
- Van Seters, John (2013). The Yahwist: A Historian of Israelite Origins. Winona Lake: Eisenbrauns. ISBN 978-1-575-06286-0.
- Van Seters, John (2015). The Pentateuch: A Social-Science Commentary. Bloomsbury T&T Clark. ISBN 978-0-567-65880-7.
- Viviano, Pauline A. (1999). "Source Criticism". In Haynes, Stephen R.; McKenzie, Steven L. (eds.). To Each Its Own Meaning: An Introduction to Biblical Criticisms and Their Application. Westminster John Knox. ISBN 978-0-664-25784-2.
- Wajdenbaum, Philippe (2016). "From Plato to Moses: Genesis-Kings as a Platonic Epic". In Hjelm, Ingrid; Thompson, Thomas L. (eds.). Biblical Interpretation Beyond Historicity. Changing Perspectives. Vol. 7. New York: Routledge. pp. 76–90. ISBN 978-1-315-69077-3.
- Whisenant, Jessica (2010). "The Pentateuch as Torah: New Models for Understanding Its Promulgation and Acceptance by Gary N. Knoppers, Bernard M. Levinson". Journal of the American Oriental Society. 130 (4): 679–681. JSTOR 23044597.
- Young, Ian (2005). "Biblical Texts Cannot be Dated Linguistically". Hebrew Studies. 46: 341–351. doi:10.1353/hbr.2005.0038. S2CID 170827388.
