= Form criticism =

Method of biblical criticism

Form criticism, as a method of biblical criticism, classifies units of scripture by literary pattern and then attempts to trace each type to its period of oral transmission. In other words, form criticism "is the endeavor to get behind the written sources of the Bible to the period of oral tradition, and to isolate the oral forms that went into the written sources. Insofar as this attempts to trace the history of the tradition, it is known as tradition criticism." Form criticism seeks to determine a unit's original form and the historical context of the literary tradition.

Hermann Gunkel (1862–1932), Martin Noth, Gerhard von Rad, and other scholars originally developed form criticism for Old Testament studies; they used it to supplement the documentary hypothesis with reference to its oral foundations. Karl Ludwig Schmidt, Martin Dibelius (1883–1947) and Rudolf Bultmann later applied form criticism to the Gospels.

While enjoying near-dominant support in both Old and New Testament studies during the 20th century, form criticism has been the subject of increasing criticism in the academic community in recent decades and its influence on the field is waning.

== Literary forms and sociological contexts ==
Form criticism begins by identifying a text's genre or conventional literary form, such as parables, proverbs, epistles, or love poems. It goes on to seek the sociological setting for each text's genre, its "situation in life" (German: Sitz im Leben). For example, the sociological setting of a law is a court, or the sociological setting of a psalm of praise (hymn) is a worship context, or that of a proverb might be a father-to-son admonition. Having identified and analyzed the text's genre-pericopes, form criticism goes on to ask how these smaller genre-pericopes contribute to the purpose of the text as a whole.

== The Evangelists ==
Studies based on form criticism state that the Evangelists drew upon oral traditions when composing the canonical gospels. This oral tradition consisted of several distinct components. Parables and aphorisms are the "bedrock of the tradition." Pronouncement stories, scenes that culminate with a saying of Jesus, are more plausible historically than other kinds of stories about Jesus. Other sorts of stories include controversy stories, in which Jesus is in conflict with religious authorities; miracle stories, including healings, exorcisms, and nature wonders; call and commissioning stories; and legends. The oral model developed by the form critics drew heavily on contemporary theory of Jewish folkloric transmission of oral material, and as a result of this form criticism one can trace the development of the early gospel tradition.

== Criticism and decline ==
=== In Old Testament Studies ===
Following the publication of Abraham in History and Tradition by John van Seters, Der sogenannte Jahwist ("The So-Called Yahwist") by Hans Heinrich Schmid, and Das überlieferungsgeschichtliche Problem des Pentateuch ("The Tradition-Historical Problem of the Pentateuch") by Rolf Rendtorff, form criticism's emphasis on oral tradition has waned in Old Testament studies. This is largely because scholars are increasingly skeptical about the ability to distinguish the "original" oral traditions from the literary sources that preserve them. As a result, the method as applied to the Old Testament now focuses on the Bible's literary genres, becoming virtually synonymous with genre criticism.

=== In New Testament studies ===
Starting from the final decade of the 20th century, Bultmann's theories about the New Testament have been the subject of increasing criticism in the academic community: scholars such as Martin Hengel, James D. G. Dunn, Richard Bauckham and Brant J. Pitre have directly attacked form criticism as an erroneous theory, and have instead argued that the Gospels were written either by eyewitnesses or by authors who had reliable written and oral sources. Alan Kirk observes that loss of confidence in form criticism was already widespread by the 1990s. EP Sanders rejected the form-critical idea that large quantities of traditions about Jesus were created by later situations in the early church, though he struggled to find an alternative. A different approach was that of Austin Farrer who argued that, while it is not possible to know where St. Mark, the writer of the first gospel, got his information, it is a more economical argument to see in his gospel, the mind of a writer rather than an editor of other people's material of which there is no evidence in the text. Though aspects of form criticism are still in the scholarly mainstream, many now admit that Bultmann's original positions have become untenable, to the point that, according to Werner H. Kelber, "Today it is no exaggeration to claim that a whole spectrum of main assumptions underlying Bultmann's Synoptic Tradition must be considered suspect." Scholars today reject the dichotomy between Palestinian Christianity and later Hellenistic Christianity the form critics posited. There is a consensus amongst scholars studying memory that the form-critical view of the oral gospel traditions as an anonymous and uncontrolled body that can be studied literarily should be dismissed.

== See also ==
- Walter Brueggemann
- Klaus Koch
- Claus Westermann

== Bibliography ==
- Armerding, Carl E. The Old Testament and Criticism. Grand Rapids: Eerdmans, 1983, pp. 43–66.
- Hayes, John H. An Introduction to Old Testament Study. Nashville: Abingdon, 1979, pp. 121–154.
- Hayes, John H., ed. Old Testament Form Criticism. San Antonio: Trinity University, 1974.
- McKnight, E.V., "What is Form Criticism?" Guide to Biblical Scholarship, New Testament; Philadelphia, 1967.
- Tucker, Gene M. Form Criticism of the Old Testament. Guides to Biblical Scholarship. Philadelphia: Fortress, 1971.
- Tucker, Gene M."Form Criticism, OT," pp. 342–345 in Interpreter's Dictionary of the Bible, Supplementary Volume. Keith Crim, gen. ed. Nashville: Abingdon, 1976.
