= Supplementary hypothesis =

Theory explaining the origins of the Torah

* / Original independent source, D, written c. 600 BCE, includes most of Deuteronomy.; ** / Written c. 540 BCE as a response and reformulation to the D source.; *** / Written c. 400 BCE and largely a redactor of J.

In biblical studies, the supplementary hypothesis proposes that the Pentateuch (the first five books of the Bible) was derived from a series of direct additions to an existing corpus of work. It serves as a revision to the earlier documentary hypothesis, which proposed that independent and complete narratives were later combined by redactors to create the Pentateuch.

The supplementary hypothesis was developed over the 19th and 20th centuries, primarily deriving from a dissatisfaction with the adequacy of the documentary hypothesis, and came to a head in the 1970s with the publication of works by John Van Seters, Rolf Rendtorff, and Hans Heinrich Schmid. In their book, An Introduction to the Bible, Kugler and Hartin argue that "the work of John Van Seters best reflects the revival of the supplementary hypothesis."

Van Seters' summation of the hypothesis accepts "three sources or literary strata within the Pentateuch," which have come to be known as the Yahwist (J), the Priestly Writer (P), and the Deuteronomist (D). Van Seters ordered the sources chronologically as DJP and clarifies that he does not view the (J) and (P) sources as independent documents but as direct additions:

- the Deuteronomist source (D) was likely written c. seventh century BCE, and influenced the composition of the Deuteronomistic History (from the Book of Joshua to 2 Kings) in the early phase of the Babylonian captivity.
- the Yahwist source (J) was likely added c. 540 BCE in the late phase of the Babylonian captivity, influencing the stories from the Genesis creation narrative to the death of Moses (Book of Genesis to the Book of Exodus and the Book of Numbers).
- the Priestly source (P) was likely added c. 400 BCE in the Second Temple period.

While the hypothesis is not the only revision of the documentary hypothesis to be made, it is one of the few at the forefront of Pentateuch studies and has been suggested by many scholars.

== Historical context ==
While documentarians originally placed the authorship of the Pentateuch in the 10th to the 6th centuries BCE, the supplementary hypothesis places the authorship of the Pentateuch later, in the 7th to 5th centuries. A major driver of this reassessment has been the evolving understanding of the historical context of the early Israelites. Biblical estimates put the earliest activity of the Israelites in Canaan in the 13th century, with Joshua's conquest.

== Major divergences from the documentary hypothesis ==
Julius Wellhausen, the leading proponent of the documentary hypothesis, proposed that the Pentateuch is the amalgamation of four independent and complete narratives which were combined by redactors. The supplementary hypothesis, as outlined by Van Seters, differs from it in three major ways:

=== The existence of the Elohist (E) source ===
The supplementary hypothesis denies the existence of an extensive Elohist (E) source, one of the four independent sources described in the documentary hypothesis. Instead, it describes the Yahwist as having borrowed from an array of written and oral traditions, combining them into the J source. It proposes that because J is compiled from many earlier traditions and stories, documentarians mistook the compilation as having multiple authors: the Yahwist (J) and the Elohist (E). Instead, the supplementary hypothesis proposes that what documentarians considered J and E are in fact a single source (some use J, some use JE), likely written in the 6th century BCE.

=== The chronology of the sources ===
The supplementary hypothesis proposes that the Deuteronomist (D) was the original, and earliest, Pentateuch writer, writing at the end of the seventh century, and ascribes the Jahwist (J) to the exilic (c. 540 BCE) and the Priestly (P) to the post-exilic (c. 400 BCE) periods.

The supplementary hypothesis argues that the Deuteronomist (D) source is of the seventh century BCE. Early Pentateuch scholars, most notably Martin Noth, argued that the Deuteronomist (D) was a single sixth century author explaining the events preceding the Babylonian exile theologically. In 1968 Frank Moore Cross suggested that Deuteronomist (D) actually originated from "dual-redactors", with the original Deuteronomist (Dtr1) being a seventh century author supporting Josiah's reforms, and Noth's later sixth century Deuteronomist (Dtr2) revising the earlier work, imbuing it with themes of punishment for the sinful as to explain the Babylonian exile. This "dual-redactor" view is likely the most common held among scholars today; Van Seters affirmed this view arguing that both the emphasis on seventh century reform and on sixth century exile shows that "Deuteronomy ... consists of an older nucleus with later expansions."

While the documentary hypothesis held that the Yahwist (J) was likely of the 10th century, the supplementary hypothesis puts it much later, in the 6th century, during the exilic period. That reassessment was made largely because of research conducted in the 1970s. A 1976 study by Hans Heinrich Schmid argued that the Yahwist (J) was aware of earlier religious writings of the 8th and 7th centuries BCE, refuting the original assessment of J as a work of the 10th century. Martin Rose (Schmid's pupil) claimed that J was composed as prologue to the Deuteronomistic history. Van Seters argues that the Yahwist (J) used "fragments, some in literary form, others as popular motifs and stories" to create a theological creation story, expanding upon the Deuteronomist's established corpus of work. By the post-exilic period, he theorizes that there was an established theological work (DJ) created by the Deutoronomist (D) and Yahwist (J).

Van Seters argues that the Priestly source (P) is not independent from the Yahwist source (J) but indeed relies heavily upon it. If J is ascribed to the exilic period, P must be of the post-exilic, or Second Temple, period, likely in the 5th century. This reassessment of chronology places the Deuteronomist as the first writer (DJP) whereas the documentary hypothesis places the Deuteronomist as a later writer (JEDP).

=== Independence of the Yahwist and Priestly sources ===
Whereas the documentary hypothesis proposed that the four Pentateuch sources were complete and independent accounts, Van Seters writes that the supplementary hypothesis "does not view the later sources J and P as independent documents but as direct additions to the earlier corpus." The hypothesis proposed that the Deuteronomist is the only independent source and that the Yahwist (J) is a reply to the Deuteronomic explanation of the Exile and a "confessional reformulation" as a theological corrective. Further, the hypothesis views the Priestly (P) source as non-independent as well. Because many P texts, Van Seters argues, "do not make sense without the larger J context," the Priestly writer is viewed as a redactor of J. A major consequence of this view that the later two sources are not independent is the removal of the need for redactors to explain the cohesion of the Pentateuch. Van Seters writes, "Since there are no separate sources after the first one, there is no need for redactors. The elaborate system of multiple redactors used by current documentarians is unnecessary".
