= Elohist =

One of the four sources of the Torah in the documentary hypothesis

Diagram of the 20th century documentary hypothesis.: J: Yahwist (10th−9th century BCE); E: Elohist (9th century BCE); Dtr1: early (7th century BCE) Deuteronomist historian; Dtr2: later (6th century BCE) Deuteronomist historian; P*: Priestly (6th−5th century BCE); D†: Deuteronomist; R: redactor; DH: Deuteronomistic history (books of Joshua, Judges, Samuel, Kings)

According to the documentary hypothesis, the Elohist (or simply E) is one of four source documents underlying the Torah, together with the Jahwist (or Yahwist), the Deuteronomist and the Priestly source. The Elohist is so named because of its repeated use of the word Elohim to refer to the Israelite God.

The Elohist source is characterized by, among other things, an abstract view of God, using Horeb instead of Sinai for the mountain where Moses received the laws of Israel and the use of the phrase "fear of God". It habitually locates ancestral stories in the north, especially Ephraim, and the documentary hypothesis holds that it must have been composed in that region, possibly in the second half of the 9th century BCE.

Because of its highly fragmentary nature, most scholars now question the existence of the Elohist source as a coherent independent document. Instead, the E material is viewed as consisting of various fragments of earlier narratives that are incorporated into the Jahwist document.

== Background ==
Modern scholars agree that separate sources and multiple authors underlie the Pentateuch, but there is much disagreement on how these sources were used to write the first five books of the Bible. This documentary hypothesis dominated much of the 20th century, but the 20th-century consensus surrounding this hypothesis has now been broken down. Those who uphold it now tend to do so in a highly modified form, giving a much larger role to the redactors (editors), who are now seen as adding much material of their own rather than as simply passive combiners of documents. Among those who reject the documentary approach altogether, the most significant revisions have been to combine E with J as a single source, and to see the Priestly source as a series of editorial revisions to that text.

The alternatives to the documentary approach can be broadly divided between "fragmentary" and "supplementary" theories. Fragmentary hypotheses, seen notably in the work of Rolf Rendtorff and Erhard Blum, see the Pentateuch as growing through the gradual accretion of material into larger and larger blocks before being joined, first by a Deuteronomic writer, (Note: "Deuteronomic" means related to the Book of Deuteronomy, which according to the hypotheses was composed in the late 7th century BCE.) and then by a Priestly writer (6th/5th century BCE), who also added his own material.

The "supplementary" approach is exemplified in the work of John Van Seters, who places the composition of J (which he, unlike the "fragmentists", sees as a complete document) in the 6th century as an introduction to the Deuteronomistic history (the history of Israel that takes up the series of books from Joshua to Kings). The Priestly writers later added their supplements to this, and these expansions continued to the end of the 4th century BCE.

== Characteristics, date and scope ==
In the E source God's name is always presented as "Elohim" or "El" until the revelation of God's name to Moses, after which God is referred to as יהוה, often represented in English as "YHWH" or "Yahweh".

E is theorized to have been composed by collecting the various stories and traditions concerning biblical Israel and its associated tribes (Dan, Napthali, Gad, Asher, Issachar, Zebulun, Ephraim, Manasseh, Benjamin), and the Levites, and weaving them into a single text. It has been argued that it reflects the views of northern refugees who came to Judah after the fall of the Kingdom of Israel (Samaria) in 722 BCE.

E has a particular fascination for traditions concerning the Kingdom of Israel and its heroes such as Joshua and Joseph. E favors Israel over the Kingdom of Judah (e.g., claiming that Shechem was purchased rather than massacred) and speaks negatively of Aaron (e.g., the story of the golden calf). E also emphasizes the importance of Ephraim, the tribe from which Jeroboam, the King of Israel, happened to derive.

Some independent source texts thought to have been embedded within E include the Covenant Code, a legal text used in Chapters 21–23 of the Book of Exodus.

== Sources ==
- Baden, Joel S. (2009). J, E, and the redaction of the Pentateuch. Mohr Siebeck. ISBN 9783161499302.
- Blenkinsopp, Joseph (2004). Treasures old and new: essays in the theology of the Pentateuch. Eerdmans. ISBN 9780802826794.
- Campbell, Antony F.; O'Brien, Mark A. (1993). Sources of the Pentateuch: texts, introductions, annotations. Fortress Press. ISBN 9780800627010.
- Carr, David M. (2014). "Changes in Pentateuchal Criticism". In Saeboe, Magne; Ska, Jean Louis; Machinist, Peter (eds.). Hebrew Bible/Old Testament. III: From Modernism to Post-Modernism. Part II: The Twentieth Century – From Modernism to Post-Modernism. Vandenhoeck & Ruprecht. ISBN 978-3-525-54022-0.
- Coogan, Michael D. (2009). A Brief Introduction to the Old Testament. Oxford University Press.
- Dozeman, Thomas B; Schmid, Konrad (2006). A Farewell to the Yahwist?. SBL. ISBN 9781589831636.
- Friedman, Richard Elliott (1987). Who Wrote the Bible?. Harper San Francisco.
- Gilbert, Christopher (2009). A Complete Introduction to the Bible. Paulist Press. ISBN 9780809145522.
- Gmirkin, Russell (2006). Berossus and Genesis, Manetho and Exodus. Bloomsbury. ISBN 978-0-567-13439-4.
- Gnuse, Robert K. (2000). "Redefining the Elohist". Journal of Biblical Literature. 119 (2): 201–220. doi:10.2307/3268483. JSTOR 3268483.
- Gooder, Paula (2000). The Pentateuch: a story of beginnings. T&T Clark. ISBN 9780567084187.
- Kugler, Robert; Hartin, Patrick (2009). An Introduction to the Bible. Eerdmans. ISBN 9780802846365.
- Murphy, Todd J. (2003). Pocket dictionary for the study of biblical Hebrew. Intervarsity Press. ISBN 9780830814589.
- Romer, Thomas (2006). "The Elusive Yahwist: A Short History of Research". In Dozeman, Thomas B.; Schmid, Konrad (eds.). A Farewell to the Yahwist?. SBL. ISBN 9781589831636.
- Van Seters, John (1998). "The Pentateuch". In McKenzie, Steven L.; Graham, Matt Patrick (eds.). The Hebrew Bible today: an introduction to critical issues. Westminster John Knox Press. ISBN 9780664256524.
- Viviano, Pauline A. (1999). "Source Criticism". In Haynes, Stephen R.; McKenzie, Steven L. (eds.). To Each Its Own Meaning: An Introduction to Biblical Criticisms and Their Application. Westminster John Knox Press. ISBN 978-0-664-25784-2.
