= The Hyksos: A New Investigation =

Book by John Van Seters

- Title page for The Hyksos: A New Investigation (1966)
- Author: John Van Seters
- Publisher: Yale University Press
- Publication date: 1966

The Hyksos: A New Investigation is a book by John Van Seters published in 1966 by Yale University Press. The main contribution of this volume is a careful linguistic analysis by Van Seters in which he argues that the Ipuwer Papyrus does not belong to the First Intermediate Period of Egyptian History (c. 2300–2200 BCE), as previously thought, but rather to the Second Intermediate Period (c. 1700–1600 BCE). Van Seters' case has not been universally accepted by Egyptologists, who continue to suggest a range of dates for the composition of Ipuwer.

== See also ==
- Hyksos
