= Hans Heinrich Schmid =

Swiss biblical scholar (1937–2014)

Hans Heinrich Schmid (22 October 1937 in Winterthur, Canton of Zürich – 4 October 2014) was a Swiss Protestant Reformed theologian, university professor and university rector.

== Life ==
He was the son of the Zurich pastor Gotthard Schmid (1909–1968). He studied theology at the Universities of Zurich and Göttingen and received his doctorate in 1965 in Zurich.

In the winter semester 1966/67 he was habilitated in Zurich and a year later was appointed as an assistant professor. In 1969, Schmid was made associate professor of Old Testament studies.

In 1972, he became the rector of Bethel Theological Seminary (Kirchlichen Hochschule Bethel). In the summer semester 1976 he was professor of Old Testament scholarship and general history of religion at the University of Zurich. From 1988 to 2000 he served as rector of the University of Zurich. During his tenure, in 1998, the University of Zurich became an independent legal entity of the Canton of Zurich.

Hans Heinrich Schmid was married in 1962 and had two sons and two daughters.

== Scholarship ==
Schmid was a respected authority on the question of Pentateuchal origins (the question of how the first five books of the bible – Genesis, Exodus, Leviticus, Book of Numbers and Deuteronomy – came to be written).

His book Der sogenannte Jahwist (The So-called Yahwist, 1976) appeared at about the same time as two other important works, John Van Seters' Abraham in History and Tradition (1975), and Rolf Rendtorff's "Das überlieferungsgeschichtliche Problem des Pentateuch" (The Problem of the Transmission of the Pentateuch, 1977). These three studies inaugurated a heated discussion in scholarly circles on the validity of the then-dominant consensus on Pentateuchal origins, the Documentary Hypothesis.

Thus, Schmid significantly contributed to the advancement of the Supplementary hypothesis of Pentateuch composition.

According to Schmid, both the J material and the P material were products of the Babylonian exile period (6th century BC) and were directly derived from Babylonian sources (see also Panbabylonism).

== Notes ==
Article is based on German Wikipedia

== Awards ==
- 1991: Honorary Doctorate of the University of Leipzig
- 1996: Grand Gold Decoration for Services to the Republic of Austria

== Writings ==
As author:

- Wesen und Geschichte der Weisheit. Eine Untersuchung zur altorientalischen und israelitischen Weisheitsliteratur (= Beihefte zur Zeitschrift für die alttestamentliche Wissenschaft. Bd. 101). Töpelmann, Berlin 1966 (Dissertation, Universität Zürich, 1965).
- Gerechtigkeit als Weltordnung. Hintergrund und Geschichte des altstamentlichen Gerechtigkeitsbegriffes. (= Beiträge zur historischen Theologie. Bd. 40). Mohr, Tübingen 1968 (Habilitationsschrift, Universität Zürich, 1968).
- bearbeitet mit Karl Huber: Zürcher Bibel-Konkordanz. Vollständiges Wort-, Namen- und Zahlen-Verzeichnis zur Zürcher Bibelübersetzung. Mit Einschluss der Apokryphen. Hrsg. vom Kirchenrat des Kantons Zürich. 3 Bände. Zwingli-Verlag (Bd. 1)/Theologischer Verlag (Bd. 2/3), Zürich 1969/1971/1973.
- Šalôm. Frieden im Alten Orient u. im Alten Testament (= Stuttgarter Bibelstudien. Bd. 51). KBW, Stuttgart 1971.
- Frieden ohne Illusionen. Die Bedeutung des Begriffs schalom als Grundlage für eine Theologie des Friedens. Theologischer Verlag, Zürich 1971.
- Altorientalische Welt in der alttestamentlichen Theologie. 6 Aufsätze. Theologischer Verlag, Zürich 1974.
- Die Steine und das Wort. Fug und Unfug biblischer Archäologie. Theologischer Verlag, Zürich 1975.
- Der sogenannte Jahwist. Beobachtungen und Fragen zur Pentateuchforschung. Theologischer Verlag, Zürich 1976.
- Kleine Bibelkunde. 12., neu bearbeitete Auflage der Kleinen Bibelkunde von Gotthard Schmid. Theologischer Verlag, Zürich 1981; 2. Auflage 1988.
- Umbau der Kirche. Die Revision der Zürcher Kirchengesetzgebung 1943–1967 aus der Sicht eines ihrer Väter: Gotthard Schmid (1909–1968) (= Neujahrsblatt der Gelehrten Gesellschaft in Zürich. Stück 151). Beer, Zürich 1988.

As editor:

- Mythos und Rationalität (= Veröffentlichungen der Wissenschaftlichen Gesellschaft für Theologie. Bd. 5). Gütersloher Verlagshaus Mohn, Gütersloh 1988 (VI. Europäischer Theologenkongress 1987 in Wien).
- mit Joachim Mehlhausen: Sola scriptura. Das reformatorische Schriftprinzip in der säkularen Welt (= Veröffentlichungen der Wissenschaftlichen Gesellschaft für Theologie. Bd. 6). Gütersloher Verlagshaus Mohn, Gütersloh 1991 (VII. Europäischer Theologenkongress 1990 in Dresden).
