= Priestly source =

One of the four sources of the Torah in the documentary hypothesis

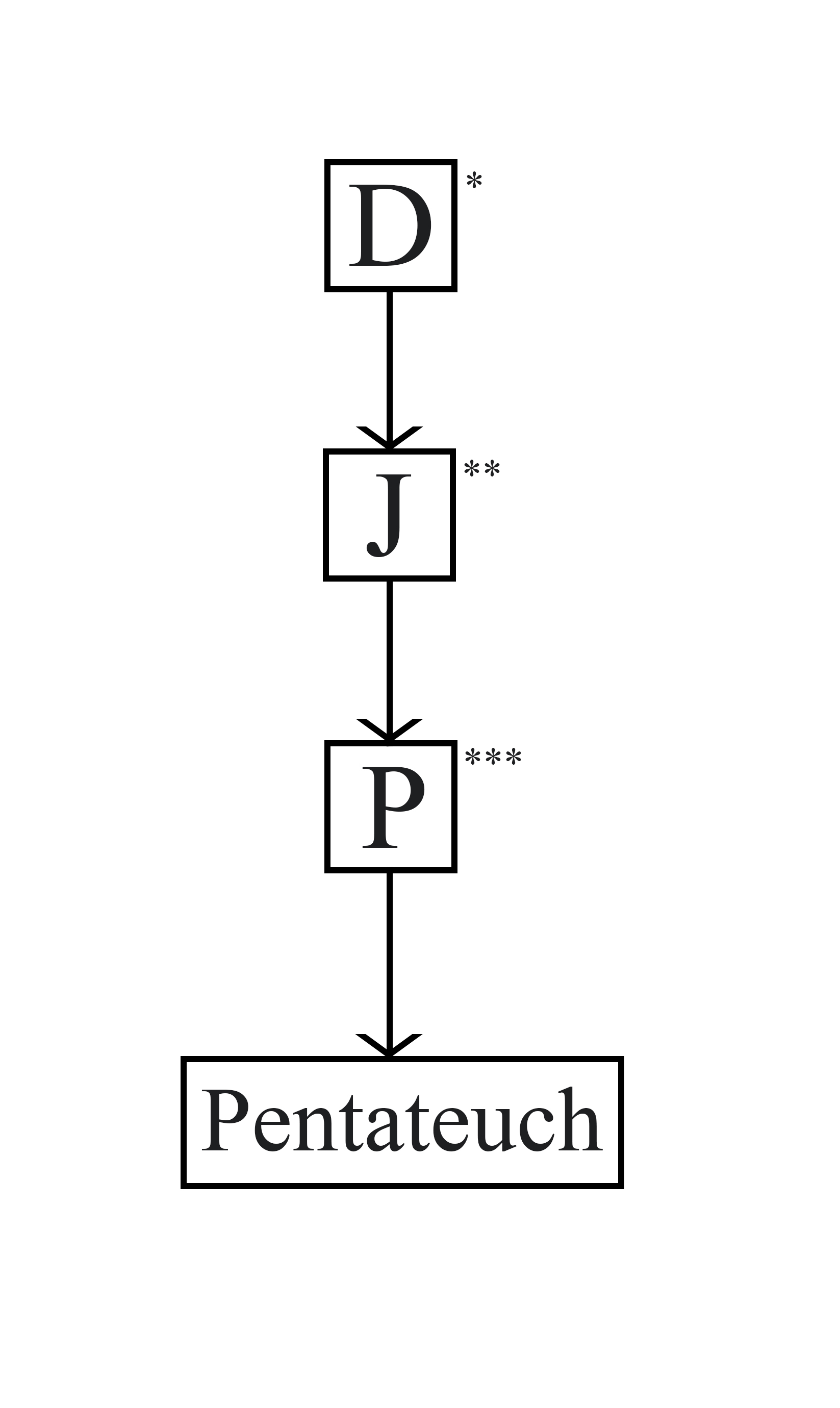
Diagram of the supplementary hypothesis, a popular model of the composition of the Torah. The Priestly source is shown as P.

The Priestly source (or simply P) is a widely recognized source underlying the Torah, and is stylistically and theologically distinct from other material in the book. It is considered by most scholars as the latest of all sources, and is "meant to be a kind of redactional layer to hold the entirety of the Pentateuch together". The source includes claims that are contradicted by non-Priestly passages and is therefore uniquely characteristic; in P, no sacrifice before the institution is ordained by Yahweh (God) at Sinai, the exalted status of Aaron and the priesthood, and the use of the divine title El Shaddai before God reveals his name to Moses, to name a few.

In general, the Priestly work is concerned with priestly matters – ritual law, the origins of shrines and rituals, and genealogies – all expressed in a formal, repetitive style. It stresses the rules and rituals of worship, and the crucial role of priests, expanding considerably on the role given to Aaron (all Levites are priests, but according to P only the descendants of Aaron were to be allowed to officiate in the inner sanctuary).

== Background ==
The history of exilic and post-exilic Judah is little known, but a summary of current theories can be made as follows:

- Religion in monarchic Judah centred around ritual sacrifice in the Temple in Jerusalem. There, worship was in the hands of priests known as Zadokites, meaning that they traced their descent from an ancestor called Zadok, who, according to the Hebrew Bible, was the high priest appointed by Samuel. There was also a lower order of religious officials called Levites who were not permitted to perform sacrifices and were restricted to menial functions.
- While the Zadokites were the only priests in Jerusalem, there were other priests at other centres. One of the most important of these was a temple at Bethel, north of Jerusalem. Bethel, the centre of the "golden calf" cult, was one of the main religious centres of the Northern Kingdom of Israel and had royal support until it was destroyed by the Neo-Assyrian Empire in 721 BCE. Aaron was in some way associated with Bethel.
- In 587 BCE, the Neo-Babylonian Empire conquered Jerusalem and took most of the Zadokite priesthood into exile, leaving behind the Levites, who were too poor and marginalised to represent a threat to their interests. The temple at Bethel now assumed a major role in the religious life of the inhabitants of Judah, and the non-Zadokite priests, under the influence of the Aaronite priests of Bethel, began calling themselves "sons of Aaron" to distinguish themselves from the "sons of Zadok".
- When the Zadokite priests returned from the Babylonian captivity after c. 538 BCE and began establishing the Second Temple, they came into conflict with the Levites. The Zadokites won the conflict but adopted the Aaronite name, whether as part of a compromise or to out-flank their opponents by co-opting their ancestor.
- The Zadokites simultaneously found themselves in conflict with the Levites, who objected to their subordinate position. The priests also won this battle, writing into the Priestly document stories such as the rebellion of Korah, which paints the challenge to priestly prerogative as unholy and unforgivable.

== The Priestly work ==
The Pentateuch or Torah (the Greek and Hebrew terms, respectively, for the Bible's books of Genesis, Exodus, Leviticus, Numbers and Deuteronomy) describe the prehistory of the Israelites from the creation of the world, through the earliest biblical patriarchs and their wanderings, to the Exodus from Egypt and the encounter with God in the wilderness. The books contain many inconsistencies, repetitions, different narrative styles, and different names for God. John Van Seters notes that within the first four books, the Tetrateuch – that is, omitting Deuteronomy – "there are two accounts of creation, two genealogies of Seth, two genealogies of Shem, two covenants between Abraham and his God, two revelations to Jacob at Bethel, two calls of Moses to rescue his people, two sets of laws given at Sinai, two Tents of Meeting/Tabernacles set up at Sinai." The repetitions, styles and names are not random, but follow identifiable patterns, and the study of these patterns led scholars to the conclusion that four separate sources lie behind them.

The 19th century scholars saw these sources as independent documents which had been edited together, and for most of the 20th century this was the accepted consensus. But in 1973 the American biblical scholar Frank Moore Cross published an influential work called Canaanite Myth and Hebrew Epic, in which he argued that P was not an independent document (i.e., a written text telling a coherent story with a beginning, middle and end), but an editorial expansion of another of the four sources, the combined Jahwist/Elohist (called JE). Cross's study was the beginning of a series of attacks on the documentary hypothesis, continued notably by the work of Hans Heinrich Schmid (The So-called Jahwist, 1976, questioning the date of the Jahwistic source), Martin Rose (1981, proposing that the Jahwist was composed as a prologue to the history which begins in Joshua), and Van Seters (Abraham in History and Tradition, proposing a 6th-century BCE date for the story of Abraham, and therefore for the Jahwist). as well as Rolf Rendtorff (The Problem of the Process of Transmission in the Pentateuch, 1989), who argued that neither the Jahwist nor the Elohist had ever existed as sources but instead represented collections of independent fragmentary stories, poems, etc.

No new consensus has emerged to replace the documentary hypothesis, but since roughly the mid-1980s an influential theory has emerged which relates the emergence of the Pentateuch to the situation in Judah in the 5th century BCE under Persian imperial rule. The central institution in the post-Exilic Persian province of Yehud (the Persian name for the former kingdom of Judah) was the reconstructed Second Temple, which functioned both as the administrative centre for the province and as the means through which Yehud paid taxes to the central government. The central government was willing to grant autonomy to local communities throughout the empire, but it was first necessary for the would-be autonomous community to present the local laws for imperial authorisation. This provided a powerful incentive for the various groups that constituted the Jewish community in Yehud to come to an agreement. The major groups were the landed families who controlled the main sources of wealth, and the priestly families who controlled the Temple. Each group had its own history of origins that legitimated its prerogatives. The tradition of the landowners was based on the old Deuteronomistic tradition, which had existed since at least the 6th century BCE and had its roots even earlier; that of the priestly families was composed to "correct" and "complete" the landowners' composition. In the final document Genesis 1–11 lays the foundations, Genesis 12–50 defines the people of Israel, and the books of Moses define the community's laws and relationship to its God.

Since the second half of the 20th century, views on the relative age of P and the Holiness Code (H) have undergone major revision. Scholars including Karl Elliger, Israel Knohl, and Christophe Nihan have argued for the younger age of H compared to P. Together with Jacob Milgrom, Knohl also identifies passages related to H elsewhere in the Pentateuch. Authors such as Bill T. Arnold and Paavo N. Tucker have argued that most of the narrative sections traditionally ascribed to P should be connected with H instead.

Many scholars attribute the laws in the P source to the desire to glorify the Aaronide priestly caste responsible for their composition.

== Narrative of the Priestly source ==
The Priestly source begins with the narrative of the creation of the world and ends at the edge of the Promised Land, telling the story of the Israelites and their relationship with their god, Yahweh, encompassing, though not continuously, the first four books of the Pentateuch, (Genesis, Exodus, Leviticus, and Numbers). The Priestly source makes evident four covenants, to Adam, Noah, Abraham, and Moses, as God reveals Himself progressively as Elohim, El Shaddai, and Yahweh. Fragments belonging to the Priestly source are known as the P texts, whose number and extent have achieved a certain consensus among scholars (e.g. Jenson 1992, Knohl 2007, Römer 2014, and Faust 2019).

Recently Axel Buhler et al. (2023), to apply an algorithm, considered the 'priestly base text' (Priesterliche Grundschrift), as running, though not continually, from Genesis 1 to Exodus 40, and "characterized by an inclusive monotheism, with the deity gradually revealing itself to humanity and to the people of Israel in particular," beginning in Genesis 1-11, where God is called Elohim, and ending "with the construction of the tent of meeting (Exodus 25–31*; 35–40*)," reflecting, along with cult, "a progressive revelation of YHWH." This text is dated to the early Persian period (end of the 6th century or beginning of the 5th century BCE), and as the rites highlighted there, circumcision and Sabbath, do not need a temple, the text shows its "universalist, monotheistic and peaceful vision." Buhler et al. (2023) also concluded that P texts correspond to around 20% of the narrative in Genesis (292/1533 verses), 50% of that in Exodus (596/1213 verses), and 33% in both (888/2746 verses).

== Characteristics, date and scope ==
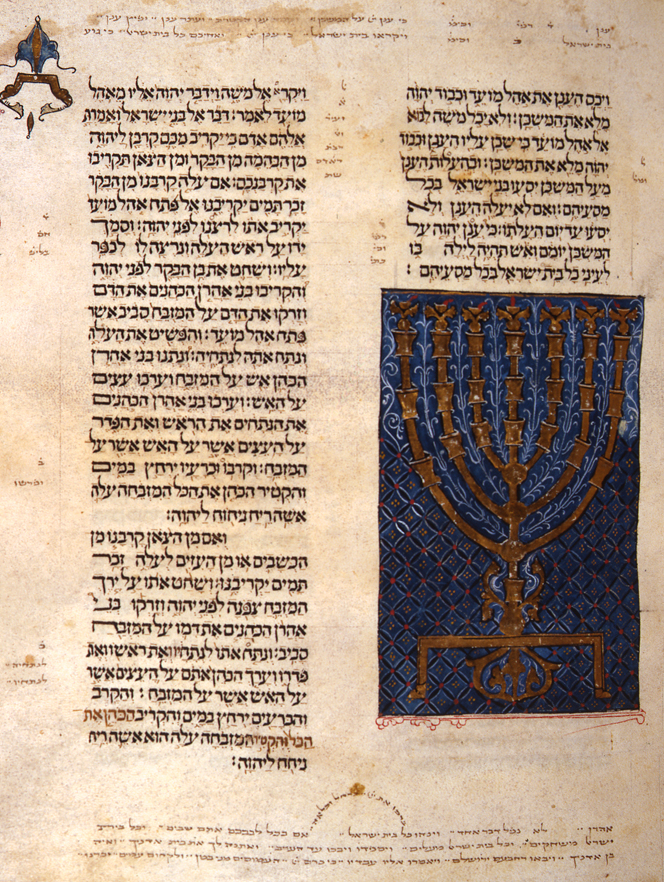
The ending of Exodus 40 and beginning of Leviticus 1, two Priestly texts, in a late thirteenth-century manuscript

=== Characteristics ===
The Priestly work is concerned with priestly matters – ritual law, the origins of shrines and rituals, and genealogies – all expressed in a formal, repetitive style. It stresses the rules and rituals of worship, and the crucial role of priests, expanding considerably on the role given to Aaron (all Levites are priests, but according to P only the descendants of Aaron were to be allowed to officiate in the inner sanctuary).

P's God is majestic, and transcendent, and all things happen because of his power and will. He reveals himself in stages, first as Elohim (a Hebrew word meaning simply "god", taken from the earlier Canaanite word meaning "the gods"), then to Abraham as El Shaddai (usually translated as "God Almighty"), and finally to Moses by his unique name, Yahweh. P divides history into four epochs from Creation to Moses by means of covenants between God and Noah, Abraham and Moses. The Israelites are God's chosen people, his relationship with them is governed by the covenants, and P's God is concerned that Israel should preserve its identity by avoiding intermarriage with non-Israelites. P is deeply concerned with "holiness", meaning the ritual purity of the people and the land: Israel is to be "a priestly kingdom and a holy nation" (Exodus 19:6), and P's elaborate rules and rituals are aimed at creating and preserving holiness.

Cases have been made for both exilic and post-exilic composition, leading to the conclusion that it has at least two layers, spanning a broad time period of 571–486 BCE. This was a period when the careful observance of ritual was one of the few means available which could preserve the identity of the people, and the narrative of the priestly authors created an essentially stable and secure world in which Israel's history was under God's control, so that even when Israel alienated itself from God, leading to the destruction of Jerusalem and the exile in Babylon, atonement could still be made through sacrifice and ritual.

=== Date ===
Julius Wellhausen, the 19th century German scholar who formulated the documentary hypothesis, fixed the chronological order of its sources as the Yahwist and Elohist, followed by the Deuteronomist, and last the Priestly. At the end of the 20th century a growing number of scholars placed both the Yahwist (the narrative strand) and the Priestly material (a mix of narrative and legal material) in the late Neo-Babylonian or Persian periods. Liane M. Fieldman (2023) considers the composition of the Pentateuch "in the fifth through fourth centuries BCE," and Priestly source being the last addition, could have been added around fourth century BCE.

While most scholars consider P to be one of the latest strata of the Pentateuch, post-dating both J and D, since the 1970s a number of Jewish scholars have challenged this assumption, arguing for an early dating of the Priestly material. Avi Hurvitz, for example, has forcefully argued on linguistic grounds that P represents an earlier form of the Hebrew language than what is found in both Ezekiel and Deuteronomy, and therefore pre-dates both of them. These scholars often claim that the late-dating of P is due in large part to a Protestant bias in biblical studies which assumes that "priestly" and "ritualistic" material must represent a late degeneration of an earlier, "purer" faith. These arguments have not convinced the majority of scholars, however.

=== Scope ===
While most scholars agree on the identification of Priestly texts in Genesis through Exodus, opinions are divided concerning the original ending of the separate P document. Suggested endings have been located in the Book of Joshua, in Deuteronomy 34, Leviticus 16 or 9:24, in Exodus 40, or in Exodus 29:46.

P is responsible for the first of the two creation stories in Genesis (Genesis 1), for Adam's genealogy, part of the Flood story, the Table of Nations, and the genealogy of Shem (i.e., Abraham's ancestry). Most of the remainder of Genesis is from the Yahwist, but P provides the covenant with Abraham (chapter 17) and a few other stories concerning Abraham, Isaac and Jacob.

The book of Exodus is also divided between the Yahwist and P, and the usual understanding is that the Priestly writer(s) were adding to an already-existing Yahwist narrative. Chapters 1–24 (from bondage in Egypt to God's appearances at Sinai) and chapters 32–34 (the golden calf incident) are from the Yahwist and P's additions are relatively minor, noting Israel's obedience to the command to be fruitful and the orderly nature of Israel even in Egypt. P was responsible for chapters 25–31 and 35–40, the instructions for making the Tabernacle and the story of its fabrication.

Leviticus 1–16 sees the world as divided between the profane (i.e., not holy) masses and the holy priests. Anyone who incurs impurity must be separated from the priests and the Temple until purity is restored through washing, sacrifice, and the passage of time. According to Nihan, the purification ritual of Leviticus 16 formed the conclusion of the original Priestly document; in this and similar views, all P-like texts after this point are post-Priestly additions.

Leviticus 17–26 is called the Holiness code, from its repeated insistence that Israel should be a holy people; scholars accept it as a discrete collection within the larger Priestly source, and have traced similar holiness writings elsewhere in the Pentateuch.

In Numbers the Priestly source or a Priestly-like supplementer contributes chapters 1–10:28, 15–20, 25–31, and 33–36, including, among other things, two censuses, rulings on the position of Levites and priests (including the provision of special cities for the Levites), and the scope and protection of the Promised Land. The Priestly themes in Numbers include the significance of the priesthood for the well-being of Israel (the ritual of the priests is needed to take away impurity), and God's provision of the priesthood as the means by which he expresses his faithfulness to the covenant with Israel.

The Priestly source in Numbers originally ended with an account of the death of Moses and succession of Joshua ("Then Moses went up from the plains of Moab to Mount Nebo..."), but when Deuteronomy was added to the Pentateuch this was transferred to the end of Deuteronomy.

== See also ==
- Deuteronomist
- Documentary hypothesis
- Elohist
- Holiness code
- Jahwist
- Torah
