= Louis Jonker =

Professor Louis C. Jonker (born 1962 in Riversdal, Western Cape province) is a South African Biblical scholar and writer.

== Education ==
After his secondary school training at Point High School in Mossel Bay, he studied at the University of Stellenbosch where he received a BA (Hebrew and Greek) Cum Laude in 1982, an HonsBA (Semitic languages) Cum Laude 1983, a BTh Cum Laude 1986; and a Lic. in Theology Cum Laude in 1987; He completed his Masters studies on a Hebrew language-related topic, receiving a MA (Semitic Languages) Cum Laude 1986, with a thesis "'n Sintakties-semantiese studie na die partisipium aktief in I Konings". His interest in exegetical methodology and hermeneutics prompted him to enroll for a Doctorate in Old Testament studies. After doing research at the University of Tübingen (Germany) and the University of Leiden (The Netherlands), he completed his doctoral degree in 1993. His thesis "Exclusivity and variety : a typological study towards the integration of exegetical methodologies in Old Testament studies" was published in 1996 by Kok Pharos in The Netherlands as Exclusivity and variety : perspectives on multidimensional exegesis (ISBN 9789039001431).

== Career ==
From 1993-2002 he was a Minister in the Dutch Reformed Church Stellenbosch-Welgelegen, and then pursued an academic career. He has held successive appointments at the University of Stellenbosch: from 2003-2006: Senior Lecturer in Old Testament; from 2006-2010: Associate professor in Old Testament; from 2010–present: Professor in Old Testament.

== Recognition ==
He has received numerous scholarships, also from the Alexander von Humboldt Stiftung, Bonn (2000, 2006, 2009, 2010, 2011, 2014, 2017)

He serves on the editorial boards of Vetus Testamentum (Brill) and Hebrew Bible and Ancient Israel (Mohr Siebeck)

He is the recipient of the Andrew Murray - Desmond Tutu prize in 2018 for his book Defining All-Israel in Chronicles (2016)

== Bibliography ==
He has published both in English and in Afrikaans.

- Jonker, Louis C, Jan Botha, and E M. Conradie. Die Bybel in Fokus: Leesgids Vir N̕ Nuwe Tyd. Kaapstad: Lux Verbi, 1997.
- Jonker, Louis C. Hierdie God-Telkens Weer Nuut!: 'n 12-Week-Bybelstudie Vir ʹn Nuwe Eeu Aan Die Hand Van Enkele Groot Temas in Die Bybel. Kaapstad: Lux Verbi, 2000
- Jonker, Louis C. Reflections of King Josiah in Chronicles: Late Stages of the Josiah Reception in Ii Chr. 34f. Gütersloh: Gütersloher Verlagshaus, 2003
- Jonker, Louis C, and Douglas G. Lawrie. Fishing for Jonah (anew): Various Approaches to Biblical Interpretation. Stellenbosch, South Africa: Sun Press, 2005.
- Jonker, Louis C. (editor) Historiography and Identity (re)formulation in Second Temple Historiographical Literature. New York: T & T Clark, 2010. Held in 133 libraries according to WorldCat.
- Jonker, Louis C. Texts, Contexts and Readings in Postexilic Literature: Explorations into Historiography and Identity Negotiation in Hebrew Bible and Related Texts. Tübingen: Mohr Siebeck, 2011.
- Jonker, Louis C. 1 & 2 Chronicles. (Understanding the Bible commentary series.) Grand Rapids, Michigan : Baker Books, 2013
- Jonker, Louis C. From Adequate Biblical Interpretation to Transformative Intercultural Hermeneutics. Chronicling a Personal Journey. Elkhart ID : Institute for Mennonite Studies., 2015.
- Jonker, Louis C. Defining All-Israel in Chronicles. 2016. Tübingen : Mohr Siebeck, 2016
- Jonker Louis C. (with GR Kotzé and C Maier) (editors) Congress Volume Stellenbosch 2016. Leiden : Brill, 2017.

He has also published more than 80 articles in scholarly journals and anthologies.
