= Jahwist =

One of the four sources of the Torah

The supplementary hypothesis, a popular model of the composition of the Torah. The Jahwist is shown as J.

The 20th-century documentary hypothesis.: J: Yahwist (10th–9th century BCE); E: Elohist (9th century BCE); Dtr1: early Deuteronomist historian (7th century BCE); Dtr2: later Deuteronomist historian (6th century BCE); P*: Priestly (6th or 5th century BCE); D†: Deuteronomist; R: Redactor; DH: Deuteronomistic history (books of Joshua, Judges, Samuel, Kings)

The Jahwist or Yahwist (J) is one of the most widely recognized sources of the Pentateuch (Torah), together with the Deuteronomist (D), the Priestly source (P) and the Elohist (E). The existence of the Jahwist text is somewhat controversial, with a number of scholars, especially in Europe, denying that it ever existed as a coherent independent document. Nevertheless, many scholars do assume its existence. The Jahwist is so named because of its characteristic use of the term Yahweh (German: Jahwe; Hebrew: יהוה) for God.

== Background ==
Modern scholars agree that separate sources underlie the Pentateuch, but there is much disagreement on how these sources were used by the authors to write the first five books of the Bible. The documentary hypothesis, that priestly editors wove several independent source narratives into the single text of the Pentateuch, dominated much of the 20th century, but the consensus surrounding this hypothesis has now broken down. Its critics give a much larger role to the literary redactors, whom they see as adding much material of their own rather than as simply passive combiners of documents.

The simple form of the documentary hypothesis has been refined by its own adherents as well. The most notable revision in recent decades is to admit that the individual E and J documents are irrecoverable altogether, major parts of them having been scrapped by the first JE redactor; or that the E document was never independent, but rather was a part of the J document.

== Characteristics ==
In J, Yahweh is an anthropomorphic figure both physically (Genesis 3:8, Genesis 11:5, Exodus 17:7) and in personality, as when Abraham bargained with Yahweh for the fate of Sodom and Gomorrah; or during the exodus when Yahweh threatened to destroy the unfaithful Israelites and raise Moses' descendants instead, but "relented and did not bring on his people the disaster" when dissuaded by Moses.

J has a particular concern with Judah, including its relationship with its rival and neighbor, Edom; with Judahite cities such as Jerusalem; and strongly supports the legitimacy of the Davidic monarchy. J is also critical of the other tribes of Israel, suggesting that the Northern Kingdom's capital of Shechem was established after a massacre of the original inhabitants (Genesis 34).

=== Coogan interpretation ===
Michael D. Coogan suggests three recurring themes in the Jahwist tradition: the relationship between humans and soil, separation between humans and God, and progressive human corruption.

J is unique in emphasizing a close relationship between humans and the soil. This motif is first found in Genesis 2:4b–3:24 when "the first human is called Adam because he is taken from the soil [Adamah in Hebrew]." Initially, man lives in harmony with the soil, but after man eats from the tree of the knowledge of good and evil, Yahweh curses the soil, condemning man to toil for his food and to return into the soil upon death. Later, Cain is a tiller of the soil (adamah), and after murdering his brother, Cain is cursed from the ground. The harmony between man and the soil is, seemingly, restored with Noah, a man of the soil who will bring surviving humanity relief from toil. Noah's drunkenness also links humans with the soil, its produce, and corruption.

Another recurring theme is the boundary between the divine and human realms. In Genesis 3:22, by eating the forbidden fruit, man and woman become like gods and are banished from the Garden of Eden, extinguishing their immortality and divine blessing. This theme is also seen in Genesis 6:1–4 in the sexual union of the sons of God with human women: Yahweh declares this a transgression and limits the life span of their offspring. In Genesis 11:1–9, the Tower of Babel seeks to rise into the divine sphere, but is prevented when Yahweh confuses mankind's language.

A third theme is progressive corruption of humanity. God creates a world that is "very good", without predation or violence, but Eve's disobedience is followed by Cain's murder of his brother Abel, until Yahweh resolves to destroy his corrupt creatures with the Flood. Corruption returns after the Flood, but God accepts that his creation is flawed.

== Date ==
Julius Wellhausen, the 19th century German scholar responsible for the classical form of the documentary hypothesis, did not attempt to date J more precisely than the monarchic period of Israel's history. In 1938, Gerhard von Rad placed J at the court of Solomon, c. 950 BCE, and argued that his purpose in writing was to provide a theological justification for the unified state created by Solomon's father, David. This was generally accepted until a crucial 1976 study by H. H. Schmid, Der sogenannte Jahwist ("The So-called Yahwist"), argued that J knew the prophetic books of the 8th and 7th centuries BCE, while the prophets did not know the traditions of the Torah, meaning J could not be earlier than the 7th century. A minority of scholars place J even later, in the exilic and/or post-exilic period (6th–5th centuries BCE).

== Scope ==
The following is a record of the stories in the Bible that are generally accepted by the wider academic community as having been written by the J source:

=== Genesis ===
The Jahwist begins with the Genesis creation narrative at Genesis 2:4 (the creation story at Genesis 1 is from P), this is followed by the Garden of Eden story, Cain and Abel, Cain's descendants, the Nephilim, a flood story (tightly intertwined with a parallel account from P), Noah's descendants, the Curse of Ham, the Table of Nations, and the Tower of Babel. These chapters make up the so-called Primeval History, the story of mankind prior to Abraham, and J and P provide roughly equal amounts of material. The Jahwist provides the bulk of the remainder of Genesis, the material concerning Abraham, Isaac, Jacob and Joseph.

Those following the classical documentary hypothesis today describe the J text spanning Genesis 2:4 to Genesis 35 with the end of the renaming of Jacob as Israel and the completion of the patriarchs of the twelve tribes. The Joseph narrative seems to be an addition from a northern "E" narrative due to the more ethereal, pro-active, and prophetic nature of God compared to the reactive and anthropomorphic God of the J text. The latest additions of the P text frame the J narratives. P text "glue" can be perceived in Genesis 1 (framing the book), Genesis 5 recounts Genesis 1 and provides a characteristic priestly lineage detail for Adam and, amongst other locations, Genesis 35, bridging the J text patriarchal narratives to the "E" Joseph narrative with more lineage details assumed important to post-exilic authors for the purpose of rebuilding the nation in the second temple period.

=== Exodus ===
Scholars argue regarding how much of Exodus is attributable to J and how much to E, as beginning in Exodus 3 the E source also refers to God as Yahweh. J provides much of the material of Exodus 1–5 but is closely intertwined with E. Thus, it is difficult to determine what portion of Exodus 1–15 is J and what is E; however, it is easy to see the parallel P strand, which also gives an account of Israel's bondage and the Exodus miracles of its own.

After leaving Egypt, J gives its own account of releasing water from a rock and God raining Manna upon the Israelites. Thereafter, there is almost no J material in Exodus, except J's account of the Ten Commandments, also known as the Ritual Decalogue. J is generally not focused on law.

=== Leviticus ===
The vast majority of scholars attribute almost the entirety of Leviticus to P.

=== Numbers ===
J begins with Numbers 10–14, the departure from Sinai, the story of the spies who are afraid of the giants in Canaan, and the refusal of the Israelites to enter the Promised Land—which then brings on the wrath of Yahweh, who condemns them to wander in the wilderness for the next forty years. J resumes at chapter 16, the story of the rebellion of Dathan and Abiram, which was spliced together with the account of Korah's rebellion from P by the Redactor. It is generally also believed that J provides large portions of chapters 21 to 24, covering the story of the bronze serpent, Balaam and his talking ass (although Friedman attributes this to E), and finally ending with the first verses of the Heresy of Baal Peor.

=== Deuteronomy ===
The majority of Deuteronomy was composed during the era of Josiah's reforms by the Deuteronomist, or D, writer. However, when Deuteronomy was incorporated into the completed Pentateuch by the Redactor, the events of Moses's death were moved from the end of Numbers to Deuteronomy. Thus, one of the accounts of Moses's death in Deuteronomy is attributable to J, although scholars debate which verses this includes.

== See also ==
- Elohist
- Deuteronomist
- Priestly source
- The Book of J
