= Claus Westermann =

German Protestant Old Testament scholar

Claus Westerman
- Born: October 7, 1909; Berlin, German Empire
- Died: June 11, 2000 (aged 90); Heidelberg, Germany
- Education: University of Tübingen; University of Marburg; University of Berlin; University of Zurich
- Parent(s): Mother: Katharina; Father: Diedrich Westermann
- Church: Lutheran
- Writings: See section on Writings of Westermann
- Congregations served: Berlin-Dahlem; Kaiser Wilhelm Memorial Church, Berlin
- Offices held: Professor Emeritus of Old Testament, University of Heidelberg
- Title: Reverend Doctor

Claus Westermann (7 October 1909 – 11 June 2000) was a German Protestant Old Testament scholar. He taught at the University of Heidelberg from 1958 to 1978.

== Biography ==
Born to African missionaries, he began his theological studies in Germany as Hitler rose to power. He finished his studies in 1933 and became a pastor, aligning with the Confessing Church rather than the (pro-Nazi) German Christians. During his theological studies he started studying the Old Testament, and became particularly interested in the content of the Psalms. He was jailed a number of times due to not supporting the German Christians and was eventually drafted into the German army during the Nazi regime. He served in the German army for five years where he was a translator on the Russian front. After Germany’s defeat he was sent to a Russian prison camp where he endured very harsh conditions. In this prison camp, with only a copy of Luther’s German translation of the New Testament and Psalms for reference, he laid the groundwork for what would become “The Praise of God in the Psalms”. After the war Westermann started preaching again and also went to teach Old Testament at Heidelberg, where he would continue to teach for twenty years with colleagues such as Gerhard von Rad, Hans Walter Wolff, and Rolf Rendtorff.,

Westermann is considered one of the premier Old Testament scholars of the twentieth century. Particularly notable among his scholarship is his lengthy and comprehensive commentary on the Book of Genesis, especially the volume covering Genesis 1-11.

== Select Publications of Westermann ==
Some works that have been translated into English

- A Thousand Years and a Day: Our Time in the Old Testament German orig. 1957 (English translation, 1962)
- Basic Forms of Prophetic Speech, German orig. 1960 (English translation by Hugh Clayton White, 1967)
- The Praise of God in the Psalms, German orig. 1961 (English translation by Keith R. Crim, 1965)
- Westermann, Claus (1965). Praise and Lament in the Psalms. Atlanta: John Knox Press. ISBN 0804217920.
- Handbook to the Old Testament German orig. (English translation by Robert Boyd, 1969)
- Creation German orig. 1971 (English translation by John J. Scullion, 1974)
- The Psalms: Structure, Content and Message German orig. 1967 (English translation by Ralph D. Gehrke, 1980), Augsburg Publishing House
- The Structure of the Book of Job: A Form-Critical Analysis, German 2nd Edition 1977 (English translation by Charles A. Muenchow, 1981)
- Elements of Old Testament Theology German orig. (English translation, 1982)
- Genesis 1 - 11, German orig. 1972 (English translation by John J. Scullion, 1984)
- Genesis 12 - 36, German orig. 1981 (English translation by John J. Scullion, 1985)
- Genesis 37 - 50, German orig. 1982 (English translation by John J. Scullion, 1986)
- The Living Psalms German orig. (English translation by J. R. Porter, 1989)
- The Gospel of John: In the Light of the Old Testament, German orig. 1994 (English translation by Siegfried S. Schatzmann, 1998)
