= John Van Seters =

Canadian religious scholar (1935–2025)

John Seters
- Born: 2 May 1935; Hamilton, Ontario, Canada
- Died: 9 April 2025 (aged 89); Waterloo, Ontario, Canada
- Education: University of Toronto (BA); Yale University (PhD)
- Notable work: The Hyksos: A New Investigation; Abraham in History and Tradition

John Van Seters (May 2, 1935 – April 9, 2025) was a Canadian scholar of the Hebrew Bible (Old Testament) and the Ancient Near East. He was a University Distinguished Professor at the University of North Carolina, and James A. Gray Professor of Biblical Literature at UNC. He completed his Ph.D at Yale University in Near Eastern Studies (1965) and earned a Th.D. h.c. from the University of Lausanne (1999). His honours and awards include a Guggenheim Fellowship, an NEH fellowship, an ACLS Fellowship, and research fellowships at Oxford, Cambridge, Katholieke Universiteit Leuven, and National Research Foundation of South Africa. His many publications include The Hyksos: A New Investigation (1966); Abraham in History and Tradition (1975); In Search of History (1983, for which he won the James H. Breasted Prize and the American Academy of Religion book award); The Edited Bible (2006); and The Biblical Saga of King David (2009).

Van Seters died in Waterloo, Ontario on April 9, 2025, at the age of 89.

== Education ==
Van Seters was born in Hamilton, Ontario. He did his undergraduate degree in Near Eastern Studies at the University of Toronto (honors BA, 1958) and his graduate studies in Near Eastern Studies at Yale University (MA, 1959; PhD,1965). He also received a theology degree from Princeton Theological Seminary (BD, 1962).

== Career ==
Van Seters's first academic appointment was at Waterloo Lutheran University (now Wilfrid Laurier University), Waterloo, Ontario, Canada, as assistant professor in the Department of Near Eastern Studies (1965–1967). He then accepted a position at Andover Newton Theological School (Newton, MA) as associate professor of Old Testament, 1967–1970. From there he returned to his alma mater in the Department of Near Eastern Studies at the University of Toronto, 1970–1977. In 1977 he accepted the position as James A. Gray Professor of Biblical Literature in the Department of Religious Studies at the University of North Carolina, Chapel Hill (1977–2000). He retired in 2000 as Distinguished University Professor of Humanities (emeritus) and returned to Canada where he resided in Waterloo, Ontario.

== Research and publications ==
Van Seters's doctoral dissertation was on the problem of the Hyksos (Yale, 1965), and published as The Hyksos: A New Investigation (1966). It challenged the consensus view about these foreign rulers of Egypt in the mid-second millennium BC on a number of points. On the matter of their origins, they were not Hurrians from northern Syria and Anatolia, they did not invade Egypt with chariots and horses and their capital city of Avaris was not to be located in the vicinity of Tanis. Instead, these foreigners came from southern Palestine, migrating into the eastern Delta during a period of political decentralization in the Second Intermediate period and eventually established the capital of their kingdom, Avaris, at Tell ed-Dab‘a. All of this was later confirmed by archaeological excavations at Tell ed-Dab‘a and at Tell el-Maskhuta in the Wadi Tumilat, one of the overland routes of entry into Egypt from Asia.

Van Seters's Abraham in History and Tradition (1975) argues that no convincing evidence exists to support the historical existence of Abraham and the other Biblical Patriarchs or the historical reliability of their origins in Mesopotamia and their exploits and travels as depicted in the book of Genesis. This book attempts to undermine both the Biblical archaeology school of William F. Albright, who had argued over the previous fifty years that the archaeological record confirmed the essential truth of the history contained in Genesis, and the "tradition history" school of Albrecht Alt and Martin Noth, which argued that Genesis contained a core of valid social pre-history of the Israelites passed down through oral tradition prior to the composition of the written book itself. In the second part of the book, Van Seters went on to put forward his own theory on the origins of the Pentateuch (the first five books of the bible: Genesis, Exodus, Leviticus, Numbers, Deuteronomy), arguing, with Martin Noth, that Deuteronomy was the original beginning of a history that extended from Deuteronomy to the end of 2 Kings. However, against Noth and others, he held that the so-called Yahwist, the oldest literary source in Genesis, Exodus and Numbers, was written in the 6th century BCE as a prologue to the older Deuteronomistic History, and that the so-called Priestly Writer of the Pentateuch was a later supplement to this history. This approach represented a revival of the "supplementary hypothesis" of a previous era of Pentateuchal studies. This literary hypothesis was expanded and defended in several of Van Seters’ later works. Along with similar revisionist works by Hans Heinrich Schmid of Zurich and Rolf Rendtorff of Heidelberg, published in 1976 and 1977, this led to a major reevaluation in Pentateuchal criticism. Abraham in History and Tradition, alongside The Historicity of the Patriarchal Narratives of Thomas Thompson, created a paradigm shift in biblical scholarship and archaeology, which gradually led scholars to no longer consider the patriarchal narratives as historical.

Van Seters next undertook a major comparative study of ancient historiography, In Search of History: Historiography in the Ancient World and the Origins of Biblical History (1983), which was recognized by the awards of James H. Breasted Prize of the American Historical Association, (1985), and the American Academy of Religion Book Award in Historical Studies (1986). The book made a comparative study of early Greek historiography down to the time of Herodotus, and various genres of Mesopotamian, Hittite, Egyptian and Levantine historiography as background for understanding the rise of historiography in ancient Israel. Special attention was given to a critical literary analysis of the so-called Deuteronomistic history from Joshua to 2 Kings.

Van Seters combined his strong interest in historiography with his revisionist work in Pentateuchal criticism in a detailed study of the Yahwist as an "antiquarian" historian writing about Israel's origins under the influence of Babylonian civilization while in exile in Babylonia during the 6th century BCE. This study is reflected in Prologue to History: The Yahwist as Historian in Genesis (1992) and The Life of Moses: The Yahwist as Historian in Exodus-Numbers (1994).

Most student handbooks on Pentateuchal studies are committed to a particular methodological approach or school of thought and largely ignore alternative theories of the Bible's compositional history. Van Seters’ introduction, The Pentateuch: A Social-Science Commentary (1999) attempts to summarize the complex state of Pentateuchal research at the end of the 20th century and to locate his own method of Pentateuchal criticism, which is socio-historical and literary, within this scholarly context.

A dating of the Yahwistic source in the Pentateuch as later than Deuteronomy also has serious implications for the history of law in the Pentateuch, because it means dating the so-called Covenant Code of Exodus 21-23 later than Deuteronomy instead of earlier and suggests a major revision in the development of Hebrew law. Van Seters attempts just such a reevaluation of legal history among the biblical codes in A Law Book for the Diaspora: Revision in the Study of the Covenant Code (2003).

One of the foundational concepts in the literary criticism of the Hebrew Bible in general and the Pentateuch in particular is the notion that the various literary components, whether small or large, were put together by redactors or editors rather than authors in the modern sense. Furthermore, this editorial process is thought to have continued until the whole biblical corpus reached a definitive "canonical" form in the early Roman period. Van Seters, in The Edited Bible: The Curious History of the "Editor" in Biblical Criticism (2006), in his most radical work to date, seeks to completely demolish any such notion of ancient editors, which was introduced into classical and biblical studies in the late 18th century. The study traces the long history of the use of "redactors" in higher and lower criticism in both classical and biblical scholarship, and he concludes that scholarly editors responsible for the reproduction of classical and biblical texts only arose in the 16th century. Such editors are completely anachronistic when applied to ancient literature.

Some regard part of the David story as the pinnacle of ancient Israelite historiography and a product of the Solomonic "enlightenment." As such it is considered indispensable for understanding the history of the Davidic-Solomonic period. Van Seters, in The Biblical Saga of King David (2009), argues that the David story does not reflect the conditions of a rather small settlement in Jerusalem in the 10th century.

== Honours ==
- The Woodrow Wilson Fellowship (1958) was awarded for graduate study at Yale University.
- Agusta-Hazard Fellowship was given by Yale for study and travel in the Near East, Oct. 1964 to May, 1965.
- Canada Council research grant, Jan. -June, 1973
- John Simon Guggenheim Memorial Award - 1979–1980
- National Endowment for the Humanities as director of seminar for college teachers summer 1984, 1989
- National Endowment for the Humanities Research Fellowship together with a visiting research fellowship, Oriel College, Oxford, 1985–86
- Awarded James H. Breasted Prize, American Historical Association, 1985 and the American Academy of Religion Book Award in Historical Studies, 1986, for In Search of History (Yale University Press, 1983).
- American Council of Learned Societies Research Fellowship, together with a visiting research fellow, Fitzwilliam College, Cambridge, 1991–92
- Senior research fellow, Katholieke Universiteit, Leuven, Jan-June, 1998
- Awarded the degree of Doctor of Theology h.c. from the University of Lausanne, Switzerland, 1999.
- Honoured with a Festschrift — Historiography in the Ancient World and in the Bible: Essays in Honour of John Van Seters, (Steven McKenzie and Thomas Römer, eds; Berlin and New York: W. de Gruyter, 2000).
- Foreign Research Fellow, National Research Fund, South Africa, August–September 2002
- Honorary Member of the Old Testament Society of South Africa, 2003.
- Awarded the R.B.Y. Scott Book Prize (Canadian Soc. of Bib. Studies, 2003) for A Law Book for the Diaspora, Oxford University Press, 2003.

Biographic profile in Marquis, Who's Who in America and Who's Who in the World.

== Reviews of selected publications ==
- "A Law Book for the Diaspora: Revision in the Study of the Covenant Code" (RBL review by Eckart Otto)
- "The Edited Bible: The Curious History of the "Editor" in Biblical Criticism (RBL review by Eckart Otto)
- The Pentateuch: A Social Science Commentary (RBL review by Jan A. Wagenaar)

== Bibliography ==
- John Van Seters, The Hyksos: A New Investigation, Yale University Press, 1966.
- John Van Seters, Abraham in History and Tradition, Yale University Press, 1975.
- John Van Seters, Prologue to History: The Yahwist as Historian in Genesis, Westminster John Knox Press, 1992.
- John Van Seters, The life of Moses: The Yahwist as Historian in Exodus-Numbers, Kok Pharos Publishing House, 1994,
- John Van Seters, Pentateuch: A Social Science Commentary, Sheffield Academic Press, 2001 (3rd edn. 2015).
- John Van Seters, The Edited Bible: the Curious History of the 'Editor' in Biblical Criticism, Eisenbrauns, 2006.
- John Van Seters, The Biblical Saga of King David, Penn State University Press, 2009.
- John Van Seters, The Yahwist: A Historian of Israelite Origins, Penn State University Press, 2013.
- John Van Seters, My Life and Career as a Biblical Scholar, Wipf and Stock, 2018.
