= Deuteronomist =

One of the most accepted sources for the Torah in source criticism

The Deuteronomist, abbreviated as either Dtr or simply D, may refer either to the source document underlying the core chapters (12–26) of the Book of Deuteronomy, or to the broader "school" that produced all of Deuteronomy as well as the Deuteronomistic history of Joshua, Judges, Samuel, Kings, and also the Book of Jeremiah. The adjectives "Deuteronomic" and "Deuteronomistic" are sometimes used interchangeably; if they are distinguished, then the first refers to the core of Deuteronomy and the second to all of Deuteronomy and the history.

The Deuteronomist is one of the sources identified through source criticism as underlying much of the Hebrew Bible. Among source-critical scholars, it is generally agreed that the Deuteronomistic history originated independently of the books of Genesis, Exodus, Leviticus and Numbers (based on the Priestly source and the Jahwist), and independently of the historical Books of Chronicles. Most scholars trace all or most of Deuteronomistic history to the Babylonian captivity (6th century BCE), and associate it with editorial reworking of both the Tetrateuch and Jeremiah.

== Background ==
Since the mid-20th century, scholars have imagined the Deuteronomists as country Levites, a junior order of priests, or as prophets in the tradition of the northern Kingdom of Israel, or as sages and scribes at the royal court. Recent scholarship has interpreted the book as involving all these groups, and the origin and growth of Deuteronomism is usually described in the following terms:

- Following the destruction of Israel by the Neo-Assyrian Empire in 722 BCE, refugees came south to Judah, bringing with them traditions, notably the concept of Yahweh as the only God who should be served, which had not previously been known. Among those influenced by these new ideas were the landowning aristocrats (called am ha'aretz "people of the land" in the Bible), who provided the administrative elite in Jerusalem.
- In 640 BCE, there was a crisis when King Amon of Judah was murdered. The aristocrats suppressed the attempted coup, putting the ringleaders to death and placing Amon's eight-year-old son Josiah on the throne.
- Judah at this time was a vassal state of Assyria, but Assyria now began a rapid and unexpected decline in power, leading to a resurgence of nationalism in Jerusalem. In 622, Josiah launched his reform program, based on an early form of Deuteronomy 5–26, framed as a covenant (treaty) between Judah and Yahweh in which Yahweh replaced the Assyrian king.
- By the end of the 7th century, the Neo-Babylonian Empire had replaced the Assyrians. The trauma of the destruction of Jerusalem by the Babylonians in 586, and the Babylonian captivity that followed led to much theological reflection on the meaning of the tragedy and the Deuteronomistic history was written as an explanation: Israel had been unfaithful to Yahweh, and the exile was God's punishment.
- By about 540, Babylonia was rapidly declining as the next rising power, the Achaemenid Empire, steadily destroyed it. With the end of the Babylonian oppression becoming ever more probable, Deuteronomy was given a new introduction and attached to the history books as an overall theological introduction.
- The final stage was the addition of a few extra laws following the Fall of Babylon to the Achaemenid Empire in 539 and the return of some (in fact only a small fraction) of the exiles to Jerusalem.

== Deuteronomistic works ==
=== Deuteronomy ===
Deuteronomy was formed by a complex process that reached probably from the 7th century BCE to the early 5th. It consists of a historical prologue; an introduction; the Deuteronomic Code followed by blessings and curses; and a conclusion.

The book's core is the law code (chapters 12–26). 2 Kings 22–23 tells how a "Book of the Law", commonly identified with the law code, was found in the Temple in Jerusalem during the reign of Josiah. According to the story in 2 Kings, reading the book caused Josiah to embark on a series of religious reforms, and it has been suggested that it was written to validate this program. Notwithstanding, it is generally accepted that at least some of the laws are much earlier than Josiah.

The introduction to the code (chapters 4:44–11:32) was added during Josiah's time, thus creating the earliest version of Deuteronomy as a book, and the historical prologue (chapters 1–4:43) was added still later to turn Deuteronomy into an introduction to the entire Deuteronomistic history (Deuteronomy to Kings).

=== Deuteronomistic history ===
The term was coined in 1943 by the German biblical scholar Martin Noth to explain the origin and purpose of Joshua, Judges, Samuel, and Kings. These, he argued, were the work of a single 6th-century BCE author/compiler seeking to explain recent events (the fall of Jerusalem and the Babylonian exile) using the theology and language of the Book of Deuteronomy. The author used his sources with a heavy hand, depicting Joshua as a grand, divinely guided conquest, Judges as a cycle of rebellion and salvation, and the story of the kings as recurring disaster due to disobedience to God.

A series of studies that modified Noth's original concept began in the late 1960s. In 1968, Frank Moore Cross made an important revision, suggesting that the history was first written in the late 7th century BCE as a contribution to King Josiah of Judah's program of reform (the Dtr1 version), and only later revised and updated by Noth's 6th-century author (Dtr2). Dtr1 saw Israel's history as a contrast between God's judgment on the sinful northern Kingdom of Israel of Jeroboam I, who set up golden calves to be worshiped in Bethel and Dan, and virtuous Judah, where faithful king David had reigned and where now the righteous Josiah was reforming the kingdom. The exilic Dtr2 supplemented Dtr1's history with warnings of a broken covenant, an inevitable punishment and exile for the sinful (in Dtr2's view) Kingdom of Judah.

Cross's "dual redaction" model is probably the most widely accepted, but a considerable number of European scholars prefer an alternative model put forward by Rudolf Smend and his pupils. This approach holds that Noth was right to locate the composition of the history in the 6th century, but that further redactions took place after the initial composition, including a "nomistic" (from the Greek word for "law"), or DtrN, layer, and a further layer concerned with the prophets, abbreviated as DtrP.

For a time, the Deuteronomistic history enjoyed "canonical" status in biblical studies. However, writing in 2000, Gary N. Knoppers noted that "in the last five years an increasing number of commentators have expressed grave doubts about fundamental tenets of Noth's classic study."

=== Jeremiah and the prophetic literature ===
The prose sermons in the Book of Jeremiah are written in a style and outlook closely akin to, yet different from, the Deuteronomistic history. Scholars differ over how much of the book is from Jeremiah himself and how much from later disciples, but the Swiss scholar Thomas Römer has recently identified two Deuteronomistic "redactions" (editings) of the Book of Jeremiah occurring some time before the end of the Exile (pre-539 BCE) – a process which also involved the prophetic books of Amos and Hosea. The biblical text records about the "authors" of the Deuteronomistic works that Jeremiah the prophet used scribes such as Baruch to accomplish his ends. It is also noteworthy that the Deuteronomistic History never mentions Jeremiah and some scholars believe that the "Jeremiah" Deuteronomists represent a distinct party from the "DtrH" Deuteronomists, with opposing agendas.

== Deuteronomism (Deuteronomistic theology) ==
Deuteronomy is conceived of as a covenant (a treaty) between the Israelites and Yahweh, who has chosen ("elected") the Israelites as his people and requires them to live according to his law. Israel is to be a theocracy with Yahweh as the divine suzerain. The law is to be supreme over all other sources of authority, including kings and royal officials, and the scribes (Sanhedrin) are the guardians of the law: prophecy is instruction in the law as given through Moses, the law given through Moses is the complete and sufficient revelation of the Will of God, and nothing further is needed.

Under the covenant, Yahweh promised the Israelites the land of Canaan, but the promise was conditional: they would lose the land if they were unfaithful. The Deuteronomistic history explains successes and failures as the result of faithfulness, which brings success, or disobedience, which brings failure; the destruction of the Kingdom of Israel by the Assyrians in 721 BCE and the Kingdom of Judah by the Babylonians in 586 BCE are Yahweh's punishment for continued sinfulness.

Deuteronomy insists on the centralisation of worship "in the place that the Lord your God will choose"; Deuteronomy never says where this place will be, but Kings makes it clear that it is Jerusalem.

It also shows a special concern for the poor, widows and the fatherless: all Israelites are brothers and sisters, and each will answer to God for his treatment of his neighbour. This concern for equality and humanity extends also to the stranger who lives among the Israelites. The stranger is often mentioned in tandem with the concern for the widow and the orphan. Furthermore, there is a specific commandment to love the stranger.

== See also ==
- Holiness code
- Gerhard von Rad

== Bibliography ==
=== Commentaries ===
- Bultmann, Christoph (2001). "Deuteronomy". In John Barton; John Muddiman (eds.). Oxford Bible Commentary. Oxford University Press. ISBN 9780198755005.
- Craigie, Peter C (1976). The Book of Deuteronomy. Eerdmans. ISBN 9780802825247.
- Miller, Patrick D (1990). Deuteronomy. Cambridge University Press. ISBN 9780664237370.
- Niditch, Susan (2008). Judges: a commentary. Westminster John Knox Press. ISBN 9780664220969.
- Phillips, Anthony (1973). Deuteronomy. Westminster John Knox Press. ISBN 9780521097727.
- Rogerson, John W. (2003). "Deuteronomy". In James D. G. Dunn; John William Rogerson (eds.). Eerdmans Commentary on the Bible. Eerdmans. ISBN 9780802837110.
- Sweeney, Marvin (2007). I&II Kings: A Commentary. Westminster John Knox Press. ISBN 9780664220846.
- Thompson, John Arthur (1980). The Book of Jeremiah. Eerdmans. ISBN 9780802825308.
- Tsumura, David Toshio (2007). The First Book of Samuel. Eerdmans. ISBN 9780802823595.

=== General ===
- Albertz, Rainer (2003). Israel in Exile: The History and Literature of the Sixth Century B.C.E. Society of Biblical Literature. ISBN 9781589830554.
- Albertz, Rainer (2000). "The riddle of the Deuteronomists". In Thomas Römer (ed.). The Future of the Deuteronomistic History. Leuven University Press. ISBN 9789042908581.
- Albertz, Rainer (1994a). History of Israelite Religion, Volume 2: From the Exile to the Maccabees. Westminster John Knox Press. ISBN 9780664227203.
- Albertz, Rainer (1994b). History of Israelite Religion, Volume 1: From the Beginnings to the End of the Monarchy. Westminster John Knox Press. ISBN 9780664227197.
- Ausloos, Hans (2015). The Deuteronomist's History. The Role of the Deuteronomist in Historical-Critical Research into Genesis–Numbers. Old Testament Studies. Vol. 67. Leiden, Netherlands – Boston, Massachusetts: Brill.
- Block, Daniel I (2005). "Deuteronomy". In Kevin J. Vanhoozer (ed.). Dictionary for Theological Interpretation of the Bible. Baker Academic. ISBN 9780801026942.
- Brueggemann, Walter (2002). Reverberations of Faith: A Theological Handbook of Old Testament themes. Westminster John Knox Press. ISBN 9780664222314.
- Brueggemann, Walter (2003). An Introduction to the Old Testament: The Canon and Christian imagination. Westminster John Knox Press. ISBN 9780664224127. "Brueggemann An introduction to the Old Testament: the canon and Christian imagination."
- Campbell, Antony F; O'Brien, Mark A (1993). Sources of the Pentateuch: Texts, Introductions, Annotations. Fortress Press. ISBN 9780800627010. "Sources of the bible."
- Campbell, Antony F; O'Brien, Mark A (2000). Unfolding the Deuteronomistic History: Origins, Upgrades, Present Text. Fortress Press. ISBN 9781451413687.
- Christensen, Duane L (1991). "Deuteronomy". In Watson E. Mills; Roger Aubrey Bullard (eds.). Mercer Dictionary of the Bible. Mercer University Press. ISBN 9780865543737.
- Cook, Stephen L (2004). The Social Roots of Biblical Yahwism. Society of Biblical Literature. ISBN 9781589830981.
- De Pury, Albert (2000). "Deuteronomistic historiography (DH): History of research and debated issues". In Albert de Pury; Thomas Römer; Jean-Daniel Macchi (eds.). Israël Constructs Its History: Deuteronomistic Historiography in Recent Research. Sheffield Academic Press. ISBN 9781841270999.
- Dillard, Raymond B.; Longman, Tremper (January 1994). An Introduction to the Old Testament (PDF). Grand Rapids, Michigan: Zondervan. ISBN 978-0-310-43250-0. LCCN 2006005249. OCLC 31046001. Archived from the original (PDF, 3.5 MB) on 2012-08-03.
- Gottwald, Norman (2006). "Stephen L. Cook, The Social Roots of Biblical Yahwism, Society of Biblical Literature, 2004 (Review)". Archived from the original on 18 May 2006.
- Knight, Douglas A (1995). "Deuteronomy and the Deuteronomists". In Mays, James Luther; Petersen, David L.; Richards, Kent Harold (eds.). Old Testament Interpretation. T&T Clark. ISBN 9780567292896.
- Knoppers, Gary N. (2000). "Is There a Future for the Deuteronomistic History?". In Thomas Römer (ed.). The Future of the Deuteronomistic History. Peeters.
- Laffey, Alice L. (2007). "Deuteronomistic theology". In Espín, Orlando O.; Nickoloff, James B. (eds.). An Introductory Dictionary of Theology and Religious Studies. Liturgical Press. ISBN 9780814658567.
- Lipschits, Oded (2005). The Fall and Rise of Jerusalem. Eisenbrauns. ISBN 9781575060958.
- McConville, J. G. (2002). "Deuteronomy". In Alexander, T. Desmond; Baker, David W. (eds.). Dictionary of the Old Testament: The Pentateuch (PDF). Eisenbrauns. Archived from the original (PDF) on 2008-04-13.
- McDermott, John J. (1989). Reading the Pentateuch: A Historical Introduction. Paulist Press. ISBN 9780809140824.
- McKenzie, Steven L. (2000). Covenant. Chalice Press. ISBN 9780827205888.
- McKenzie, Steven L. (1995). "Postscript". In Schearing, Linda S.; McKenzie, Steven L. (eds.). Those elusive Deuteronomists: The Phenomenon of Pan-Deuteronomism. T&T Clark. ISBN 9781841270104.
- Rabin, Elliott (2006). Understanding the Hebrew Bible: A Reader's Guide. KTAV Publishijg House. p. 127. ISBN 9780881258714.
- Richter, Sandra L. (2002). The Deuteronomistic History and the Name Theology. Walter de Gruyter. ISBN 9783110173765.
- Rofé, Alexander (2002). Deuteronomy: Issues and Interpretation. T&T Clark. ISBN 9780567087546.
- Römer, Thomas (2000). "Deuteronomy In Search of Origins". In Knoppers, Gary N.; McConville, J. Gordon (eds.). Reconsidering Israel and Judah: Recent Studies on the Deuteronomistic History. Eisenbrauns. ISBN 9781575060378.
- Römer, Thomas (1994). "The Book of Deuteronomy". In McKenzie, Steven L.; Graham, Matt Patrick (eds.). The History of Israel's Traditions: The Heritage of Martin Noth. Sheffield Academic Press. ISBN 9781850754992.
- Römer, Thomas (1995). "How did Jeremiah Become a Convert to Deuteronomistic Ideology?". In Schearing, Linda S.; McKenzie, Steven L. (eds.). Those Elusive Deuteronomists: The Phenomenon of Pan-Deuteronomism. T&T Clark. ISBN 9781841270104.
- Schearing, Linda S. (1995). "Introduction". In Schearing, Linda S.; McKenzie, Steven L. (eds.). Those Elusive Deuteronomists: The Phenomenon of Pan-Deuteronomism. T&T Clark. ISBN 9781841270104.
- Ska, Jean-Louis (2006). Introduction to Reading the Pentateuch. Eisenbrauns. ISBN 9781575061221.
- Sparks, Kenton L. (1998). Ethnicity and Identity in Ancient Israel. Eisenbrauns. ISBN 9781575060330.
- Spieckermann, Hermann (2001). "The Former Prophets: The Deuteronomistic History". In Perdue, Leo G. (ed.). The Blackwell companion to the Hebrew Bible. Blackwell. ISBN 9780631210719.
- Tigay, Jeffrey (1996). "The Significance of the End of Deuteronomy". In Fox, Michael V.; et al. (eds.). Texts, Temples, and Traditions: A Tribute to Menahem Haran. Eisenbrauns. ISBN 9781575060033.
- Van Seters, John (2015) [1999]. The Pentateuch: A Social-Science Commentary. Bloomsbury T&T Clark. ISBN 978-0-567-65880-7.
- Van Seters, John (1998). "The Pentateuch". In McKenzie, Steven L.; Graham, Matt Patrick (eds.). The Hebrew Bible Today: An Introduction to Critical Issues. Westminster John Knox Press. ISBN 9780664256524.
- Viviano, Pauline A. (1999). Haynes, Stephen R.; McKenzie, Steven L. (eds.). To each its own meaning: an introduction to biblical criticisms and their application. Westminster John Knox Press. ISBN 9780664257842.
- Wells, Roy D. (1991). "Deuteronomist/Deuteronomistic Historian". In Mills, Watson E.; Bullard, Roger Aubrey (eds.). Source criticism=Mercer Dictionary of the Bible. Mercer University Press. ISBN 9780865543737.
