= Rolf Rendtorff =

German Old Testament scholar and theologian (1925–2014)

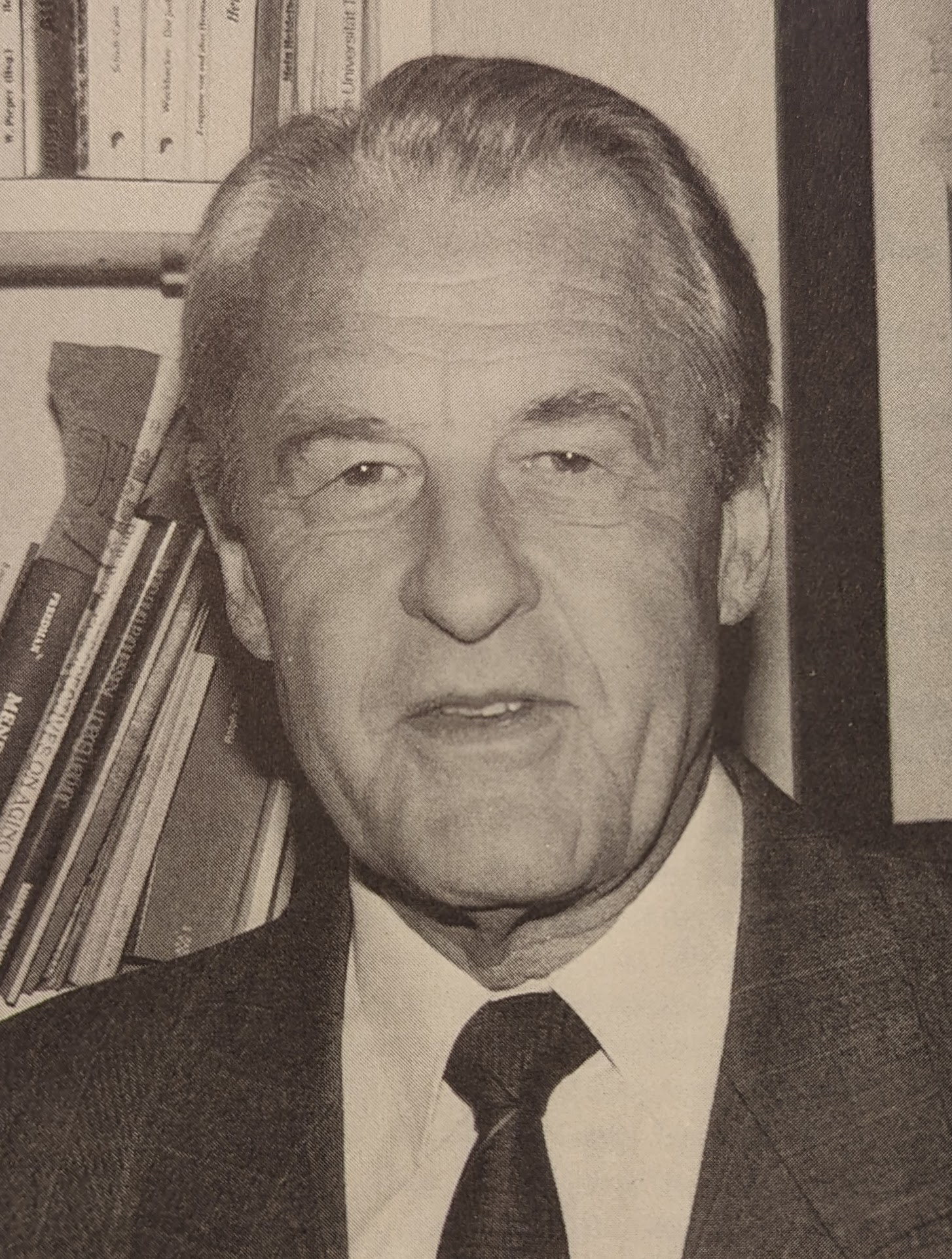
- Rendtorff in 1990
- Born: 10 May 1925; Preetz, Schleswig-Holstein, Germany
- Died: 1 April 2014 (aged 88); Heidelberg, Baden-Württemberg, Germany
- Occupation: Professor of Old Testament
- Years active: 1958–1990
- Parent: Heinrich Rendtorff (Father)
- Awards: Buber-Rosenzweig-Medal (2002)

Academic background
- Education: University of Kiel (1945–1946; 1948–1949); Kirchliche Hochschule Bethel (1946–1947); University of Göttingen (1947–1948; 1952–1953]; University of Heidelberg (1949–1950)
- Thesis: "Die Gesetze in der Priesterschrift: Eine gattungsgeschichtliche Untersuchung" ("The Laws in the Priestly Scripture: A Genre-historical Investigation") (1950)
- Doctoral advisor: Gerhard von Rad
- Influences: Gerhard von Rad, Walther Zimmerli, Claus Westermann, Brevard Childs

Academic work
- Discipline: Biblical Studies
- Sub-discipline: Old Testament; Biblical Theology
- Institutions: Kirchliche Hochschule Berlin (1958–1963); University of Heidelberg (1963–1990)
- Notable works: The Problem of the Process of Transmission in the Pentateuch (English: 1990; German: 1977); Canon and Theology: Overtures to an Old Testament Theology (English: 1993; German: 1991); The Canonical Hebrew Bible: A Theology of the Old Testament (English: 2005; German: 1999–2001)

Rolf Rendtorff (10 May 1925 – 1 April 2014) was Professor of Old Testament at the University of Heidelberg from 1963 to 1990. He was one of the more significant German Old Testament scholars from the latter half of the twentieth-century and published extensively on various topics related to the Hebrew Bible. Rendtorff was especially notable for his contributions to the question of the origins of the Pentateuch, his adoption of a "canonical approach" to Old Testament theology, and his concerns over the relationship between Jews and Christians.

== Biography ==
Rendtorff was born in Preetz, Holstein, Germany on 10 May 1925. After serving in the German Navy (Kriegsmarine) during World War II, he studied theology from 1945 to 1950 at the universities of Kiel, Göttingen, and Heidelberg. He completed his doctoral studies under the supervision of Gerhard von Rad in 1950, then returned to Göttingen to finish a habilitation under Walther Zimmerli in 1953. Rendtorff’s first academic post was as professor of Old Testament at the Berlin Church University (Kirchliche Hochschule Berlin) from 1958–1963, where he later served as rector during the 1962–1963 school year. In 1963, he was appointed to a chair at the University of Heidelberg, working in the Old Testament department alongside Gerhard von Rad and Claus Westermann. He filled this post for twenty-seven years until his retirement in 1990, serving in several administrative positions over this time, including dean of the theological faculty during 1964–1965 and university rector from 1970–1972. Rendtorff died on 1 April 2014.

== Major Contributions ==
Rendtorff published many works on Old Testament subjects, but one of the most notable was his 1977 book, Das überlieferungsgeschichtliche Problem des Pentateuch (translated into English in 1990 as The Problem of the Transmission of the Pentateuch). The book was a study of the question of Pentateuchal origins (the question of how the first five books of the bible – Genesis, Exodus, Leviticus, Numbers and Deuteronomy – came to be written), and appeared at the same time as two other important books, John Van Seters's Abraham in History and Tradition (1975), and Hans Heinrich Schmid's Der sogenannte Jahwist (The So-called Yahwist) (1976). The three studies, published almost at the same time, inaugurated a heated discussion in scholarly circles on the validity of the then-dominant consensus on Pentateuchal origins, the Documentary Hypothesis. Rendtorff's work in particular has been described as "certainly one of the most important contributions to Old Testament scholarship in the twentieth century."

== Authored Works ==
- Die Gesetze in der Priesterschrift: Eine gattungsgeschichtliche Untersuchung, Forschungen zur Religion und Literatur des Alten und Neuen Testaments, vol. 2/44, Göttingen: Vandenhoeck & Ruprecht, 1954
- Gottes Geschichte: Der Anfang unseres Weges im Alten Testament, Hamburg: Furche-Verlag, 1962
- Studien zur Geschichte des Opfers im Alten Israel, Wissenschaftliche Monographien zum Alten und Neuen Testament, vol. 24, Neukirchen-Vluyn: Neukirchener Verlag, 1967
- Gesammelte Studien zum Alten Testament, Theologische Bücherei, vol. 57, Munich: Kaiser, 1975
- Das überlieferungsgeschichtliche Problem des Pentateuch, Beihefte zur Zeitschrift für die alttestamentliche Wissenschaft, vol. 147, Berlin: de Gruyter, 1977
  - The Problem of the Process of Transmission in the Pentateuch, Journal for the Study of the Old Testament Supplement Series, vol. 89, translated by John J. Scullion, Sheffield: JSOT Press, 1990
- Das Alte Testament: Eine Einführung, Neukirchen-Vluyn: Neukirchener Verlag, 1983
  - The Old Testament: An Introduction, translated by John Bowden, Philadelphia: Fortress Press, 1986
- Kanon und Theologie: Vorarbeiten zu einer Theologie des Alten Testaments, Neukirchen-Vluyn: Neukirchener Verlag, 1991
  - Canon and Theology: Overtures to an Old Testament Theology, Overtures to Biblical Theology, translated by Margaret Kohl, Philadelphia: Fortress Press, 1993
- Die Bundesformel: Eine exegetisch-theologische Untersuchung, Stuttgarter Bibelstudien, vol. 160, Stuttgart: Verlag Katholisches Bibelwerk, 1995
  - The Covenant Formula: An Exegetical and Theological Investigation, Old Testament Studies, translated by Margaret Kohl, Edinburgh: T&T Clark, 1998
- Theologie des Alten Testaments: Ein kanonischer Entwurf, Neukirchen-Vluyn: Neukirchener Verlag, 1999–2001
  - The Canonical Hebrew Bible: A Theology of the Old Testament, Tools for Biblical Studies, vol. 7, translated by David E. Orton, Leiden: Deo, 2005
- Leviticus 1,1–10,20, Biblischer Kommentar Altes Testament, vol. 3/1, Göttingen: Vandenhoeck & Ruprecht, 2004
- Kontinuität im Widerspruch: Autobiographische Reflexionen, Göttingen: Vandenhoeck & Ruprecht, 2007

== Festschrifts ==
- Rupprecht, Konrad, ed. (1975). Sefer Rendtorff: Festschrift zum 50sten Geburtstag von Rolf Rendtorff. Dielheimer Blätter zum Alten Testament und seiner Rezeption in der Alten Kirche Beiheft. Vol. 1. Dielheim: Im Selbstverlag der Autoren.
- Blum, Erhard; Christian Macholz; Ekkehard W. Stegemann, eds. (1990). Die Hebräische Bibel und ihre zweifache Nachgeschichte: Festschrift für Rolf Rendtorff zum 65. Geburtstag. Neukirchen-Vluyn: Neukirchener Verlag.
- Blum, Erhard, ed. (2000). Mincha: Festgabe für Rolf Rendtorff zum 75. Geburtstag. Neukirchen-Vluyn: Neukirchener Verlag.
