= Biblical criticism =

Scholarly study of biblical writings

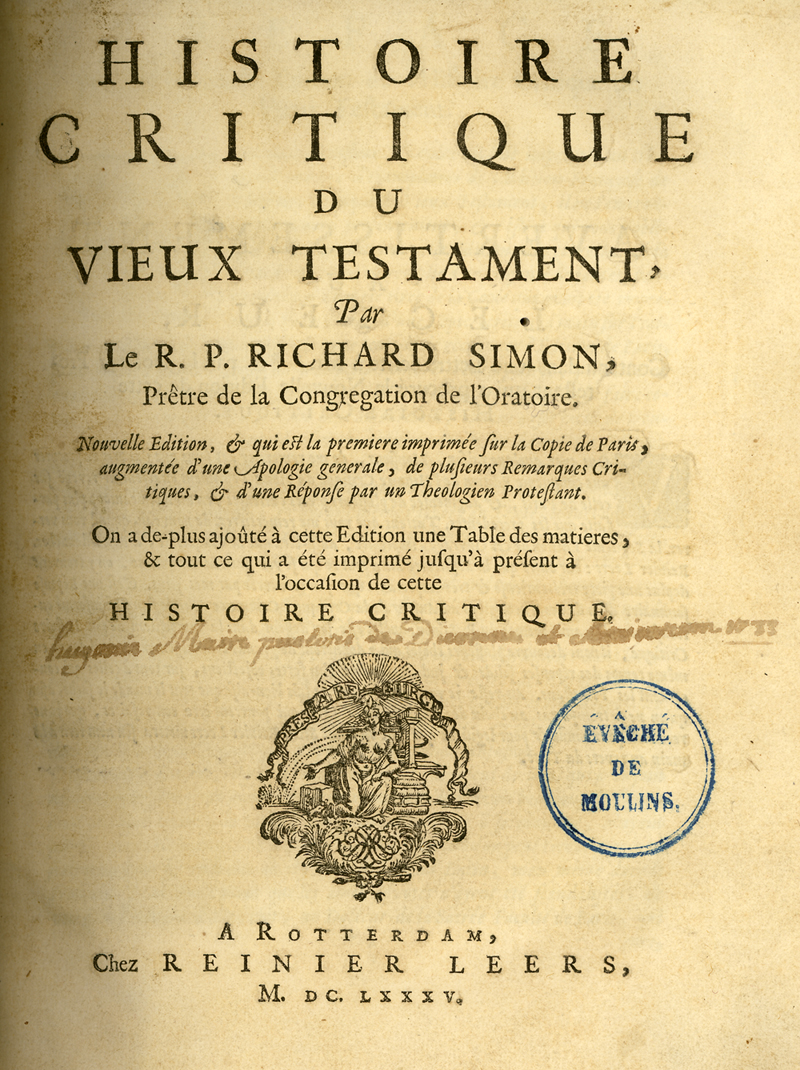
Title page of Richard Simon's Critical History (1685), an early work of biblical criticism

Biblical criticism is the study of the Bible using historical, literary, and other methods of critical analysis. Modern biblical criticism initially focused on reconstructing the historical events behind biblical texts and the history of how the texts developed, using methods that emphasized reason and objectivity. Biblical criticism helped establish the Bible as an object of cultural and academic study beyond confessional interpretations.

The emergence of modern biblical criticism is generally traced to the European Enlightenment, particularly the German Enlightenment, although a minority view traces its origins to the Protestant Reformation. Rationalism, German pietism, and British deism influenced its development. In the nineteenth century, biblical criticism became a major approach to biblical studies. The quest for the historical Jesus had begun in the late eighteenth century and continued through successive periods of research into the twentieth and twenty-first centuries.

Biblical scholars commonly employ textual, source, form, and redaction criticism together. Textual criticism examines biblical manuscripts and their variants; source criticism investigates the sources underlying biblical texts; form criticism analyzes smaller units of text and their historical settings; and redaction criticism examines how sources and traditions were edited into their final forms. From the mid-twentieth century, literary criticism increasingly shifted attention from the historical development of texts to the texts themselves; literary approaches included canonical, rhetorical, and narrative criticism.

After 1970, biblical criticism expanded beyond its predominantly historical orientation as literary and interdisciplinary approaches became more prominent. By 1990, it had developed into a group of disciplines with differing and sometimes conflicting interests. New perspectives from scholars of different ethnicities and from feminist, Jewish, and Catholic traditions, together with globalization, broadened the field. This diversification also challenged the earlier ideal of neutral judgment, placing greater emphasis on recognizing the perspectives and biases that readers bring to biblical texts. Postmodern biblical criticism questioned claims to objective or neutral foundations, while post-critical interpretation questioned the separation of a text's meaning from its historical reference.

== Definition ==
Daniel J. Harrington defines biblical criticism as "the effort at using scientific criteria (historical and literary) and human reason to understand and explain, as objectively as possible, the meaning intended by the biblical writers." The original biblical criticism has been mostly defined by its historical concerns. Critics focused on the historical events behind the text as well as the history of how the texts themselves developed. So much biblical criticism has been done as history, and not theology, that it is sometimes called the "historical-critical method" or historical-biblical criticism (or sometimes higher criticism) instead of just biblical criticism. Biblical critics used the same scientific methods and approaches to history as their secular counterparts and emphasized reason and objectivity. Neutrality was seen as a defining requirement.

By 1990, new perspectives, globalization and input from different academic fields expanded biblical criticism, moving it beyond its original criteria, and changing it into a group of disciplines with different, often conflicting, interests. Biblical criticism's central concept changed from neutral judgment to beginning from a recognition of the various biases the reader brings to the study of the texts. Newer forms of biblical criticism are primarily literary: no longer focused on the historical, they attend to the text as it exists now.

== History ==
=== Eighteenth century ===
In the Enlightenment era of the European West, philosophers and theologians such as Thomas Hobbes (1588–1679), Benedict Spinoza (1632–1677), and Richard Simon (1638–1712) began to question the long-established Judeo-Christian tradition that Moses was the author of the first five books of the Bible known as the Pentateuch. Spinoza wrote that Moses could not have written the preface to the fifth book, Deuteronomy, since he never crossed the Jordan River into the Promised Land. There were also other problems such as Deuteronomy 31:9 which references Moses in the third person. According to Spinoza: "All these details, the manner of narration, the testimony, and the context of the whole story lead to the plain conclusion that these books were written by another, and not by Moses in person".

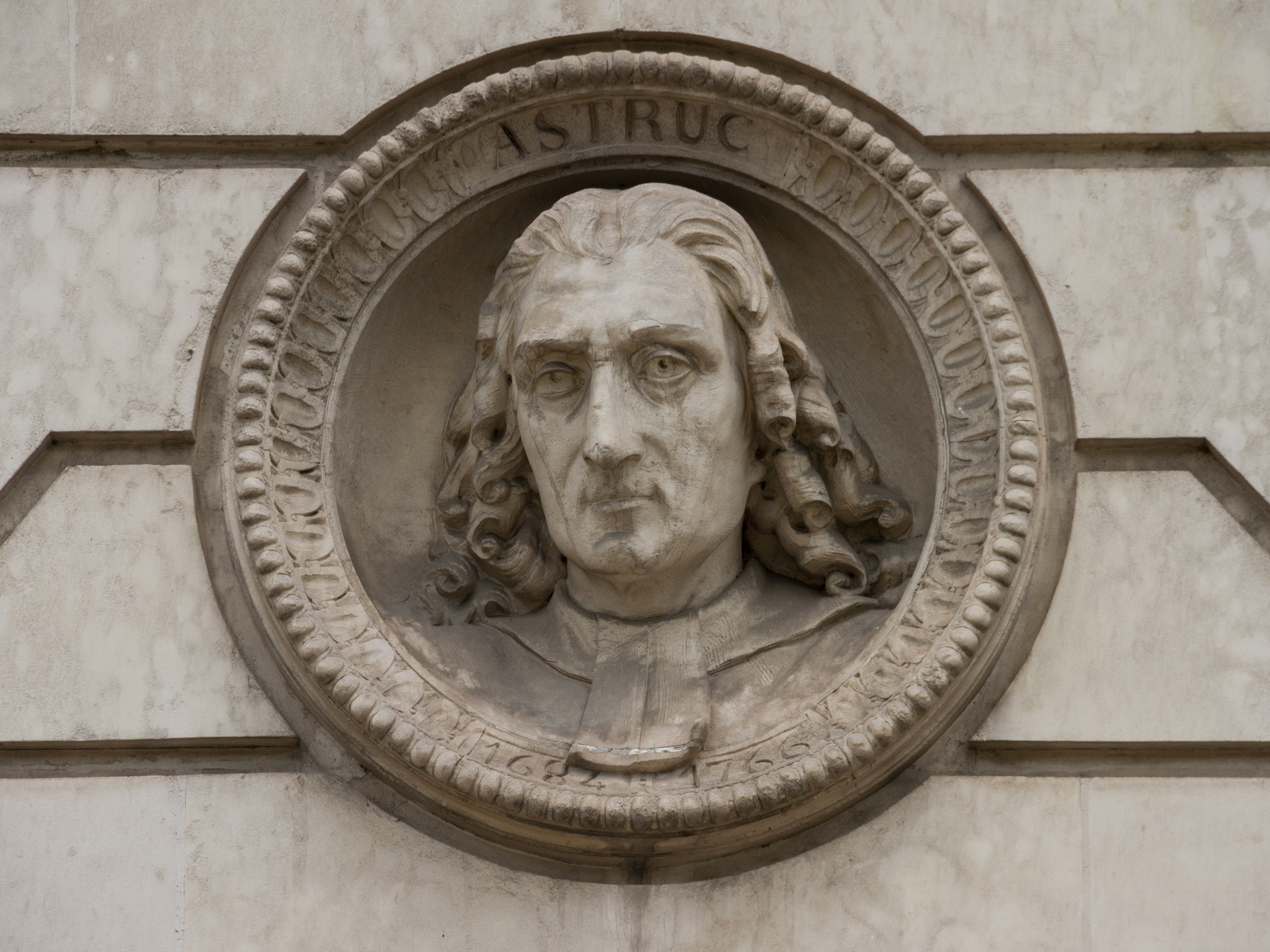
Jean Astruc, often called the "Father of Biblical criticism", at Centre hospitalier universitaire de Toulouse

Jean Astruc (1684–1766), a French physician, believed these critics were wrong about Mosaic authorship. According to Old Testament scholar Edward Young (1907–1968), Astruc believed that Moses assembled the first book of the Pentateuch, the book of Genesis, using the hereditary accounts of the Hebrew people. Biblical criticism is often said to have begun when Astruc borrowed methods of textual criticism (used to investigate Greek and Roman texts) and applied them to the Bible in search of those original accounts. Astruc believed that, through this approach, he had identified the separate sources that were edited together into the book of Genesis. The existence of separate sources explained the inconsistent style and vocabulary of Genesis, discrepancies in the narrative, differing accounts and chronological difficulties, while still allowing for Mosaic authorship. Astruc's work was the genesis of biblical criticism, and because it has become the template for all who followed, he is often called the "Father of Biblical criticism".

The questioning of religious authority common to German Pietism contributed to the rise of biblical criticism. Rationalism also became a significant influence: Swiss theologian Jean Alphonse Turretin (1671–1737) is an example of the "moderate rationalism" of the era. Turretin believed that the Bible was divine revelation, but insisted that revelation must be consistent with nature and in harmony with reason, "For God who is the author of revelation is likewise the author of reason". What was seen as extreme rationalism followed in the work of Heinrich Paulus (1761–1851) who denied the existence of miracles.

Johann Salomo Semler (1725–1791) had attempted in his work to navigate between divine revelation and extreme rationalism by supporting the view that revelation was "divine disclosure of the truth perceived through the depth of human experience". He distinguished between "inward" and "outward" religion: for some people, their religion is their highest inner purpose, while for others, religion is a more exterior practice – a tool to accomplish other purposes more important to the individual, such as political or economic goals. Recognition of this distinction now forms part of the modern field of cognitive science of religion. Semler argued for an end to all doctrinal assumptions, giving historical criticism its nonsectarian character. As a result, Semler is often called the father of historical-critical research. "Despite the difference in attitudes between the thinkers and the historians [of the German enlightenment], all viewed history as the key ... in their search for understanding".

Communications scholar James A. Herrick (b. 1954) says that even though most scholars agree that biblical criticism evolved out of the German Enlightenment, there are some historians of biblical criticism that have found "strong direct links" with British deism. Herrick references the German theologian Henning Graf Reventlow (1929–2010) as linking deism with the humanist world view, which has been significant in biblical criticism. Matthew Tindal (1657–1733), as part of British deism, asserted that Jesus taught an undogmatic natural religion that the Church later changed into its own dogmatic form. Tindal's view of Christianity as a "mere confirmation of natural religion and his resolute denial of the supernatural" led him to conclude that "revealed religion is superfluous". British deism was also an influence on the philosopher and writer Hermann Samuel Reimarus (1694–1768) in developing his criticism of revelation.

The biblical scholar Johann David Michaelis (1717–1791) advocated the use of other Semitic languages in addition to Hebrew to understand the Old Testament, and in 1750, wrote the first modern critical introduction to the New Testament. Instead of interpreting the Bible historically, Johann Gottfried Eichhorn (1752–1827), Johann Philipp Gabler (1753–1826), and Georg Lorenz Bauer (1755–1806) used the concept of myth as a tool for interpreting the Bible. Rudolf Bultmann later used this approach, and it became particularly influential in the early twentieth century.

George Ricker Berry says the term "higher criticism", which is sometimes used as an alternate name for historical criticism, was first used by Eichhorn in his three-volume work Einleitung ins Alte Testament (Introduction to the Old Testament) published between 1780 and 1783. The term was originally used to differentiate higher criticism, the term for historical criticism, from lower, which was the term commonly used for textual criticism at the time. The importance of textual criticism means that the term 'lower criticism' is no longer prevalent in twenty-first century studies.

A twenty-first century view of biblical criticism's origins, that traces it to the Reformation, is a minority position, but the Reformation is the source of biblical criticism's advocacy of freedom from external authority imposing its views on biblical interpretation. Long before Richard Simon, the historical context of the biblical texts was important to Joachim Camerarius (1500–1574) who wrote a philological study of figures of speech in the biblical texts using their context to understand them. Hugo Grotius (1583–1645) paved the way for comparative religion studies by analyzing New Testament texts in the light of Classical, Jewish and early Christian writings.

==== Historical Jesus: the first quest ====
The first quest for the historical Jesus is also sometimes referred to as the Old Quest. It began with the publication of Hermann Samuel Reimarus's work after his death. G. E. Lessing (1729–1781) claimed to have discovered copies of Reimarus's writings in the library at Wolfenbüttel when he was the librarian there. Reimarus had left permission for his work to be published after his death, and Lessing did so between 1774 and 1778, publishing them as Die Fragmente eines unbekannten Autors (The Fragments of an Unknown Author). Over time, they came to be known as the Wolfenbüttel Fragments. Reimarus distinguished between what Jesus taught and how he is portrayed in the New Testament. According to Reimarus, Jesus was a political Messiah who failed at creating political change and was executed by the Roman state as a dissident. His disciples then stole the body and invented the story of the resurrection for personal gain.

Albert Schweitzer in The Quest of the Historical Jesus, acknowledges that Reimarus's work "is a polemic, not an objective historical study", while also referring to it as "a masterpiece of world literature." According to Schweitzer, Reimarus was wrong in his assumption that Jesus's end-of-world eschatology was "earthly and political in character" but was right in viewing Jesus as an apocalyptic preacher, as evidenced by his repeated warnings about the destruction of Jerusalem and the end of time. This eschatological approach to understanding Jesus has since become universal in modern biblical criticism. Schweitzer also comments that, since Reimarus was a historian and not a theologian or a biblical scholar, he "had not the slightest inkling" that source criticism would provide the solution to the problems of literary consistency that Reimarus had raised.

Reimarus's controversial work garnered a response from Semler in 1779: Beantwortung der Fragmente eines Ungenannten (Answering the Fragments of an Unknown). Schweitzer records that Semler "rose up and slew Reimarus in the name of scientific theology". Respect for Semler temporarily repressed the dissemination and study of Reimarus's work, but Semler's response had no long-term effect. Reimarus's writings, on the other hand, did have a long-term effect. They made a lasting change in the practice of biblical criticism by making it clear it could exist independently of theology and faith. His work also showed biblical criticism could serve its own ends, be governed solely by rational criteria, and reject deference to religious tradition. Reimarus's central question, "How political was Jesus?", continues to be debated by theologians and historians such as Wolfgang Stegemann, Gerd Theissen and Craig S. Keener.

In addition to overseeing the publication of Reimarus's work, Lessing made contributions of his own, arguing that the proper study of biblical texts requires knowing the context in which they were written. This is now the accepted scholarly view.

=== Nineteenth century ===
Professors Richard Soulen and Kendall Soulen write that biblical criticism reached "full flower" in the nineteenth century, becoming the "major transforming fact of biblical studies in the modern period". The height of biblical criticism's influence is represented by the history of religions school (Note: known in German as Kultgeschichtliche Schule or Religionsgeschichtliche Schule.) a group of German Protestant theologians associated with the University of Göttingen. In the late nineteenth century, they sought to understand Judaism and Christianity within the overall history of religion. Other Bible scholars outside the Göttingen school, such as Heinrich Julius Holtzmann (1832–1910), also used biblical criticism. Holtzmann developed the first listing of the chronological order of the New Testament texts based on critical scholarship.

Many insights in understanding the Bible that began in the nineteenth century continue to be discussed in the twenty-first; in some areas of study, such as linguistic tools, scholars merely appropriate earlier work, while in others they "continue to suppose they can produce something new and better". For example, some modern histories of Israel include historical biblical research from the nineteenth century. In 1835, and again in 1845, theologian Ferdinand Christian Baur postulated the apostles Peter and Paul had an argument that led to a split between them thereby influencing the mode of Christianity that followed. This still occasions widespread debate within topics such as Pauline studies, New Testament Studies, early-church studies, Jewish Law, the theology of grace, and the doctrine of justification. Albrecht Ritschl's challenge to orthodox atonement theory continues to influence Christian thought.

Nineteenth-century biblical critics "thought of themselves as continuing the aims of the Protestant Reformation". According to Robert M. Grant and David Tracy, "One of the most striking features of the development of biblical interpretation during the nineteenth century was the way in which philosophical presuppositions implicitly guided it". Michael Joseph Brown points out that biblical criticism operated according to principles grounded in a distinctively European rationalism. By the end of the nineteenth century, these principles were recognized by Ernst Troeltsch in an essay, Historical and Dogmatic Method in Theology, where he described three principles of biblical criticism: methodological doubt (a way of searching for certainty by doubting everything); analogy (the idea that we understand the past by relating it to our present); and mutual inter-dependence (every event is related to events that proceeded it).

Biblical criticism's focus on pure reason produced a paradigm shift that profoundly changed Christian theology concerning the Jews. Anders Gerdmar uses the legal meaning of emancipation, as in free to be an adult on their own recognizance, when he says the "process of the emancipation of reason from the Bible ... runs parallel with the emancipation of Christianity from the Jews". In the previous century, Semler had been the first Enlightenment Protestant to call for the "de-Judaizing" of Christianity. While taking a stand against discrimination in society, Semler also wrote theology that was strongly negative toward the Jews and Judaism. He saw Christianity as something that 'superseded' all that came before it. This stark contrast between Judaism and Christianity produced increasingly antisemitic sentiments. Supersessionism, instead of the more traditional millennialism, became a common theme in Johann Gottfried Herder (1744–1803), Friedrich Schleiermacher (1768–1834), Wilhelm Martin Leberecht de Wette (1780–1849), Ferdinand Christian Baur (1792–1860), David Strauss (1808–1874), Albrecht Ritschl (1822–1889), the history of religions school of the 1890s, and on into the form critics of the twentieth century until World War II.

==== Historical Jesus: the lives of Jesus ====
The late-nineteenth century saw a renewed interest in the quest for the historical Jesus which primarily involved writing versions of the life of Jesus. Important scholars of this quest included David Strauss (1808–1874), whose Life of Jesus used a mythical interpretation of the gospels to undermine their historicity. The book was culturally significant because it contributed to weakening church authority, and it was theologically significant because it challenged the divinity of Christ. In The Essence of Christianity (1900), Adolf Von Harnack (1851–1930) described Jesus as a reformer. William Wrede (1859–1906) rejected all the theological aspects of Jesus and asserted that the "messianic secret" of Jesus as Messiah emerged only in the early community and did not come from Jesus himself. Ernst Renan (1823–1892) promoted the critical method and was opposed to orthodoxy. Wilhelm Bousset (1865–1920) attained honors in the history of religions school by contrasting what he called the joyful teachings of Jesus's new righteousness and what Bousset saw as the gloomy call to repentance made by John the Baptist. While at Göttingen, Johannes Weiss (1863–1914) wrote his most influential work on the apocalyptic proclamations of Jesus.

In 1896, Martin Kähler (1835–1912) wrote The So-called Historical Jesus and the Historic Biblical Christ. It critiqued the quest's methodology, with a reminder of the limits of historical inquiry, saying it is impossible to separate the historical Jesus from the Jesus of faith, since Jesus is only known through documents about him as Christ the Messiah.

The Old Quest was not considered closed until Albert Schweitzer (1875–1965) wrote Von Reimarus zu Wrede which was published in English as The Quest of the Historical Jesus in 1910. In it, Schweitzer scathingly critiqued the various books on the life of Jesus that had been written in the late-nineteenth century as reflecting more of the lives of the authors than Jesus. Schweitzer revolutionized New Testament scholarship at the turn of the century by proving to most of that scholarly world that the teachings and actions of Jesus were determined by his eschatological outlook; he thereby finished the quest's pursuit of the apocalyptic Jesus. Schweitzer concluded that any future research on the historical Jesus was pointless.

=== Twentieth century ===
In the early twentieth century, biblical criticism was shaped by two main factors and the clash between them. First, form criticism arose and turned the focus of biblical criticism from author to genre, and from individual to community. Next, a scholarly effort to reclaim the Bible's theological relevance began. Karl Barth (1886–1968), Rudolf Bultmann (1884–1976), and others moved away from concern over the historical Jesus and concentrated instead on the kerygma: the message of the New Testament.

Most scholars agree that Bultmann is one of the "most influential theologians of the twentieth-century", but that he also had a "notorious reputation for his de-mythologizing" which was debated around the world. Demythologizing refers to the reinterpretation of the biblical myths (stories) in terms of the existential philosophy of Martin Heidegger (1889–1976). Bultmann claimed myths are "true" anthropologically and existentially but not cosmologically. As a major proponent of form criticism, Bultmann "set the agenda for a subsequent generation of leading NT [New Testament] scholars".

Around the midcentury point the denominational composition of biblical critics began to change. This was due to a shift in perception of the critical effort as being possible on the basis of premises other than liberal Protestantism. Redaction criticism also began in the mid-twentieth century. While form criticism had divided the text into small units, redaction emphasized the literary integrity of the larger literary units instead.

The discovery of the Dead Sea Scrolls at Qumran in 1947 renewed interest in archaeology's potential contributions to biblical studies, but it also posed challenges to biblical criticism. For example, the majority of the Dead Sea texts are closely related to the Masoretic Text that the Christian Old Testament is based upon, while other texts bear a closer resemblance to the Septuagint (the ancient Greek version of the Hebrew texts) and still others are closer to the Samaritan Pentateuch. This has raised the question of whether or not there is such a thing as an "original text". If there is no original text, the entire purpose of textual criticism is called into question.

New Testament scholar Joachim Jeremias (1900–1979) used linguistics, and Jesus's first-century Jewish environment, to interpret the New Testament. The biblical theology movement of the 1950s produced debate between Old Testament and New Testament scholars over the unity of the Bible. The rise of redaction criticism closed this debate by bringing about a greater emphasis on diversity. The New quest for the historical Jesus began in 1953 and was so-named in 1959 by James M. Robinson.

After 1970, biblical criticism began to change radically and pervasively. New criticism, which developed as an adjunct to literary criticism, was concerned with the particulars of style. New historicism, a literary theory that views history through literature, also developed. Biblical criticism began to apply new literary approaches such as structuralism and rhetorical criticism, which concentrated less on history and more on the texts themselves. In the 1970s, the New Testament scholar E. P. Sanders (1937–2022) advanced the New Perspective on Paul, which has greatly influenced scholarly views on the relationship between Pauline Christianity and Jewish Christianity in the Pauline epistles. Sanders also advanced study of the historical Jesus by putting Jesus's life in the context of first-century Second-Temple Judaism. In 1974, the theologian Hans Frei published The Eclipse of Biblical Narrative, which became a landmark work leading to the development of post-critical interpretation. The third period of focused study on the historical Jesus began in 1988.

By 1990, biblical criticism as a primarily historical discipline changed into a group of disciplines with often conflicting interests. New perspectives from different ethnicities, feminist theology, Catholicism and Judaism offered insights previously overlooked by the majority of white male Protestants who had dominated biblical criticism from its beginnings. (Note: Fiorenza says, "Christian male theologians have formulated theological concepts in terms of their own cultural experience, insisting on male language relating to God, and on a symbolic universe in which women do not appear... Feminist scholars insist that religious texts and traditions must be reinterpreted so that women and other "non-persons" can achieve full citizenship in religion and society".; This "leads naturally to a second indictment against biblical criticism: that it is the preserve of a small coterie of people in the rich Western world, trying to legislate for how the vast mass of humanity ought to read the Bible. ...Not only has such criticism detached the Bible from believing communities, it has also appropriated it for a particular group: namely white, male, Western scholars".) Globalization also introduced different worldviews; these new points-of-view created awareness that the Bible can be rationally interpreted from many different perspectives. In turn, this awareness changed biblical criticism's central concept from the criteria of neutral judgment to that of beginning from a recognition of the various biases the reader brings to the study of the texts.

==== Historical Jesus: the New quest into the twenty-first century ====
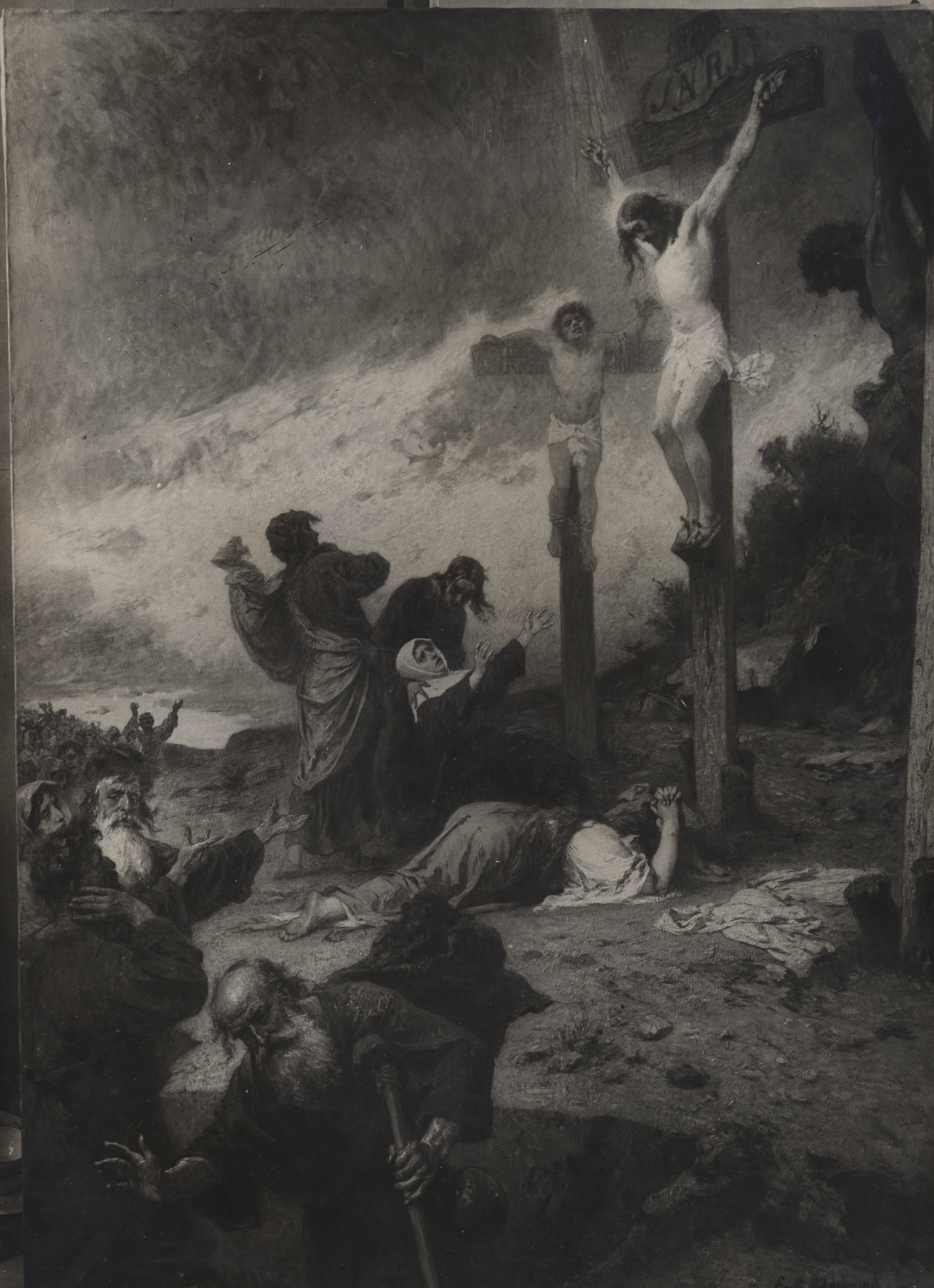
Ernst Hildebrand's 1910 painting Kreuzigung Christi depicts the crucifixion of Jesus. The crucifixion is widely regarded by historians as a historical event.

There is no general agreement among scholars on how to periodize the various quests for the historical Jesus. Most scholars agree the first quest began with Reimarus and ended with Schweitzer, that there was a "no-quest" period in the first half of the twentieth century, and that there was a second quest, known as the "New" quest that began in 1953 and lasted until 1988 when a third began. However, Stanley E. Porter (b. 1956) calls this periodization "untenable and belied by all of the pertinent facts", arguing that people were searching for the historical Jesus before Reimarus, and that there never has been a period when scholars were not doing so.

In 1953, Ernst Käsemann (1906–1998), gave a famous lecture before the Old Marburgers, his former colleagues at the University of Marburg, where he had studied under Bultmann. In this stronghold of support for Bultmann, Käsemann claimed "Bultmann's skepticism about what could be known about the historical Jesus had been too extreme". Bultmann had claimed that, since the gospel writers wrote theology, their writings could not be considered history, but Käsemann reasoned that one does not necessarily preclude the other. James M. Robinson named this the New quest in his 1959 essay "The New Quest for the Historical Jesus". This quest focused largely on the teachings of Jesus as interpreted by existentialist philosophy. Interest waned again by the 1970s.

N. T. Wright asserts that the third quest began with the Jesus Seminar in 1988. By then, it became necessary to acknowledge that "the upshot of the first two quests ... was to reveal the frustrating limitations of the historical study of any ancient person". According to Ben Witherington, probability is all that is possible in this pursuit. Paul Montgomery in The New York Times writes that "Through the ages scholars and laymen have taken various positions on the life of Jesus, ranging from total acceptance of the Bible to assertions that Jesus of Nazareth is a creature of myth and never lived."

Sanders explains that, because of the desire to know everything about Jesus, including his thoughts and motivations, and because there are such varied conclusions about him, it seems to many scholars that it is impossible to be certain about anything. Yet according to Sanders, "we know quite a lot" about Jesus. While scholars rarely agree about what is known or unknown about the historical Jesus, according to Witherington, scholars do agree that "the historic questions should not be dodged".

== Major methods ==
Theologian David R. Law writes that biblical scholars usually employ textual, source, form, and redaction criticism together. The Old Testament (the Hebrew Bible), and the New Testament, as distinct bodies of literature, each raise their own problems of interpretation - the two are therefore generally studied separately. For purposes of discussion, these individual methods are separated here and the Bible is addressed as a whole, but this is an artificial approach that is used only for the purpose of description, and is not how biblical criticism is actually practiced.

=== Textual criticism ===
Textual criticism involves examination of the text itself and all associated manuscripts with the aim of determining the original text. It is one of the largest areas of biblical criticism in terms of the sheer amount of information it addresses. The roughly 900 manuscripts found at Qumran include the oldest extant manuscripts of the Hebrew Bible. They represent every book except Esther, though most books appear only in fragmentary form. The New Testament has been preserved in more manuscripts than any other ancient work, having over 5,800 complete or fragmented Greek manuscripts, 10,000 Latin manuscripts and 9,300 manuscripts in various other ancient languages including Syriac, Slavic, Gothic, Ethiopic, Coptic, and Armenian texts. The dates of these manuscripts are generally accepted to range from c.110–125 (the 𝔓^{52} papyrus) to the introduction of printing in Germany in the fifteenth century. There are also approximately a million direct New Testament quotations in the collected writings of the Church Fathers of the first four centuries. (As a comparison, the next best-sourced ancient text is the Iliad, presumably written by the ancient Greek Homer in the late eighth or early seventh century BCE, which survives in more than 1,900 manuscripts, though many are of a fragmentary nature.)

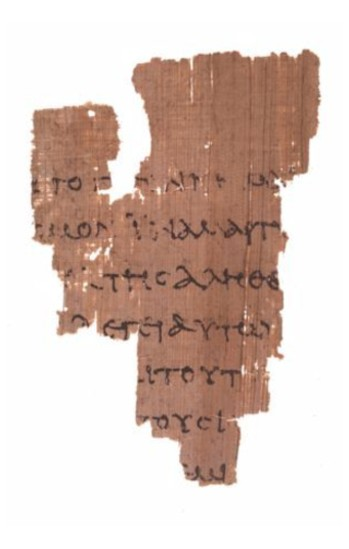
The Rylands fragment P52 verso is the oldest existing fragment of New Testament papyrus. It contains phrases from the Book of John.

These texts were all written by hand, by copying from another handwritten text, so they are not alike in the manner of printed works. The differences between them are called variants. A variant is simply any variation between two texts. Many variants are simple misspellings or mis-copying. For example, a scribe might drop one or more letters, skip a word or line, write one letter for another, transpose letters, and so on. Some variants represent a scribal attempt to simplify or harmonize, by changing a word or a phrase.

The exact number of variants is disputed, but the more texts survive, the more likely there will be variants of some kind. Variants are not evenly distributed throughout any set of texts. Charting the variants in the New Testament shows it is 62.9 percent variant-free. The impact of variants on the reliability of a single text is usually tested by comparing it to a manuscript whose reliability has been long established. Though many new early manuscripts have been discovered since 1881, there are critical editions of the Greek New Testament, such as NA28 and UBS5, that "have gone virtually unchanged" from these discoveries. "It also means that the fourth century 'best texts', the 'Alexandrian' codices Vaticanus and Sinaiticus, have roots extending throughout the entire third century and even into the second".

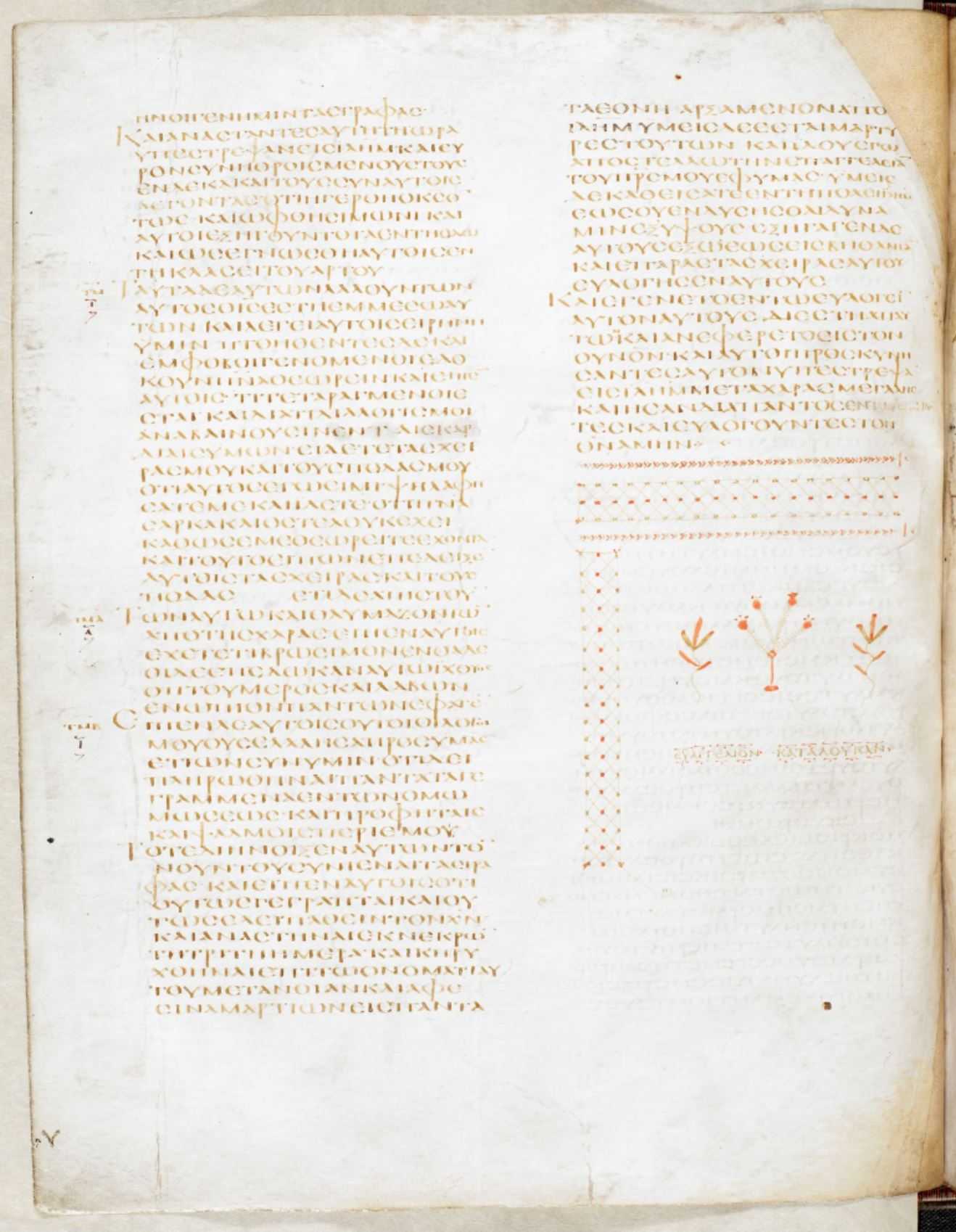
Folio 41v from Codex Alexandrinus. The Alexandrian textual family is based on this codex.

Variants are classified into families. Say scribe 'A' makes a mistake and scribe 'B' does not. Copies of scribe 'A's text with the mistake will thereafter contain that same mistake. Over time the texts descended from 'A' that share the error, and those from 'B' that do not share it, will diverge further, but later texts will still be identifiable as descended from one or the other because of the presence or absence of that original mistake. The multiple generations of texts that follow, containing the error, are referred to as a "family" of texts. Textual critics study the differences between these families to piece together what the original looked like. Sorting out the wealth of source material is complex, so textual families were sorted into categories tied to geographical areas. The divisions of the New Testament textual families were Alexandrian (also called the "Neutral text"), Western (Latin translations), and Eastern (used by churches centred on Antioch and Constantinople). (Note: There is some consensus among twenty-first century textual critics that the various locations traditionally assigned to the text types are incorrect and misleading. Thus, the geographical labels should be used with caution; some scholars prefer to refer to the text types as "textual clusters" instead.)

Forerunners of modern textual criticism can be found in both early Rabbinic Judaism and in the early church. Rabbis addressed variants in the Hebrew texts as early as 100CE. Tradition played a central role in their task of producing a standard version of the Hebrew Bible. The Hebrew text they produced stabilized by the end of the second century, and has come to be known as the Masoretic Text.

==== Problems of textual criticism ====
The two main processes of textual criticism are recension and emendation:

- Recension is the selection of the most trustworthy evidence on which to base a text.
- Emendation is the attempt to eliminate the errors which are found even in the best manuscripts.

Jerome McGann says these methods innately introduce a subjective factor into textual criticism despite its attempt at objective rules. Alan Cooper discusses this difficulty using the example of Amos 6.12 which reads: "Does one plough with oxen?" The obvious answer is "yes", but the context of the passage seems to demand a "no". Cooper explains that a recombination of the consonants allows it to be read "Does one plough the sea with oxen?" The amendment has a basis in the text, which is believed to be corrupted, but is nevertheless a matter of personal judgment.

This contributes to textual criticism being one of the most contentious areas of biblical criticism, as well as the largest, with scholars such as Arthur Verrall referring to it as the "fine and contentious art". It uses specialized methodologies, enough specialized terms to create its own lexicon, and is guided by a number of principles. Yet any of these principles—and their conclusions—can be contested. For example, in the late 1700s, textual critic Johann Jacob Griesbach (1745 – 1812) developed fifteen critical principles for determining which texts are likely the oldest and closest to the original. One of Griesbach's rules is lectio brevior praeferenda: "the shorter reading is to be preferred". This was based on the assumption that scribes were more likely to add to a text than omit from it, making shorter texts more likely to be older.

Latin scholar Albert C. Clark challenged Griesbach's view of shorter texts in 1914. Based on his study of Cicero, Clark argued omission was a more common scribal error than addition, saying "A text is like a traveler who goes from one inn to another losing an article of luggage at each halt". Clark's claims were criticized by those who supported Griesbach's principles. Clark responded, but disagreement continued. Nearly eighty years later, the theologian and priest James Royse took up the case. After close study of multiple New Testament papyri, he concluded Clark was right, and Griesbach's rule of measure was wrong. Some twenty-first century scholars have advocated abandoning these older approaches to textual criticism in favor of new computer-assisted methods for determining manuscript relationships in a more reliable way.

=== Source criticism ===
Source criticism is the search for the original sources that form the basis of biblical texts. In Old Testament studies, source criticism is generally focused on identifying sources of a single text. For example, the seventeenth-century French priest Richard Simon (1638–1712) was an early proponent of the theory that Moses could not have been the single source of the entire Pentateuch. According to Simon, parts of the Old Testament were not written by individuals at all, but by scribes recording the community's oral tradition. The French physician Jean Astruc presumed in 1753 that Moses had written the book of Genesis (the first book of the Pentateuch) using ancient documents; he attempted to identify these original sources and to separate them again. He did this by identifying repetitions of certain events, such as parts of the flood story that are repeated three times, indicating the possibility of three sources. He discovered that the alternation of two different names for God occurs in Genesis and up to Exodus 3 but not in the rest of the Pentateuch, and he also found apparent anachronisms: statements seemingly from a later time than that in which Genesis was set. This and similar evidence led Astruc to hypothesize that the sources of Genesis were originally separate materials that were later fused into a single unit that became the book of Genesis.

==== Source criticism of the Old Testament: Wellhausen's hypothesis ====
Diagram showing the authors and editors of the Pentateuch (Torah) according to the Documentary hypothesis; J: Yahwist (10th–9th century BCE); E: Elohist (9th century BCE); Dtr1: early (7th century BCE) Deuteronomist historian; Dtr2: later (6th century BCE) Deuteronomist historian; P*: Priestly (6th–5th century BCE); D†: Deuteronomist; R: redactor; DH: Deuteronomistic history (books of Joshua, Judges, Samuel, Kings)

Source criticism's most influential work is Julius Wellhausen's Prolegomena zur Geschichte Israels (Prologue to the History of Israel, 1878) which sought to establish the sources of the first five books of the Old Testament - collectively known as the Pentateuch. Wellhausen correlated the history and development of those five books with the development of the Jewish faith. The Wellhausen hypothesis (also known as the JEDP theory, or the Documentary hypothesis, or the Graf–Wellhausen hypothesis) proposes that the Pentateuch was combined out of four separate and coherent (unified single) sources (not fragments).

J stands for the Yahwist source, (Jahwist in German), and was considered to be the most primitive in style and therefore the oldest. E (for Elohist) was thought to be a product of the Northern Kingdom before BCE 721; D (for Deuteronomist) was said to be written shortly before it was found in BCE 621 by King Josiah of Judah (2 Chronicles 34:14-30). Old Testament scholar Karl Graf (1815–1869) suggested an additional priestly source in 1866; by 1878, Wellhausen had incorporated this source, P, into his theory, which is thereafter sometimes referred to as the Graf–Wellhausen hypothesis. Wellhausen argued that P had been composed during the exile of the 6th century BCE, under the influence of Ezekiel. These sources are supposed to have been edited together by a late final Redactor (R) who is only imprecisely understood.

Later scholars added to and refined Wellhausen's theory. For example, the Newer Documentary Thesis inferred more sources, with increasing information about their extent and inter-relationship. The fragmentary theory was a later understanding of Wellhausen produced by form criticism. This theory argues that fragments of documents — rather than continuous, coherent documents — are the sources for the Pentateuch. Alexander Geddes and Johann Vater proposed that some of these fragments were quite ancient, perhaps from the time of Moses, and were brought together only at a later time. This accounts for diversity but not structural and chronological consistency.

One can see the Supplementary hypothesis as yet another evolution of Wellhausen's theory that solidified in the 1970s. Proponents of this view assert three sources for the Pentateuch: the Deuteronomist as the oldest source, the Elohist as the central core document, with a number of fragments or independent sources as the third. Deuteronomy is seen as a single coherent document with a uniformity of style and language in spite of also having different literary strata. This observation led to the idea there was such a thing as a Deuteronomist school that had originally edited and kept the document updated. This meant the supplementary model became the literary model most widely agreed upon for Deuteronomy, which then supports its application to the remainder of the Pentateuch as well.

===== Critique of Wellhausen =====
Advocates of Wellhausen's hypothesis contend it accounts well for the differences and duplication found in the Pentateuchal books. Furthermore, they argue, it provides an explanation for the peculiar character of the material labeled P, which reflects the perspective and concerns of Israel's priests. Wellhausen's theory went virtually unchallenged until the 1970s, when it began to be heavily criticized. By the end of the 1970s and into the 1990s, "one major study after another, like a series of hammer blows, has rejected the main claims of the Documentary theory, and the criteria on the basis of which they were argued". It has been criticized for its dating of the sources, and for assuming that the original sources were coherent or complete documents. Studies of the literary structure of the Pentateuch have shown J and P used the same structure, and that motifs and themes cross the boundaries of the various sources, which undermines arguments for their separate origins. (Note: Viviano says: "While source criticism has always had its detractors, the past few decades have witnessed an escalation in the level of dissatisfaction".: Frank Moore Cross published Canaanite Myth and Hebrew Epic in 1973, arguing that P was not an independent coherent document but was instead an editorial expansion of the combined Jahwist/Elohist. That was the beginning of a series of attacks on the documentary hypothesis.; Hans Heinrich Schmid followed with The So-called Jahwist (1976), which questioned the date of the Jahwistic source. Martin Rose, in 1981, proposed that Jahwist was a prologue to the history which begins in Joshua, and Van Seters, in Abraham in History and Tradition, proposed a 6th-century BCE date for the Jahwist.; In 1989, Rolf Rendtorff used form criticism to show the development of the Pentateuch was opposite to the manner the Documentary hypothesis claimed. He argued in The Problem of the Process of Transmission in the Pentateuch that neither the Jahwist nor the Elohist had ever existed as coherent sources and had only ever been independent fragmentary stories, poems, etc.; Mid-twentieth century scholars of oral tradition objected to the "book mentality" of source criticism, saying the idea that ancients had "cut and pasted" from their sources reflects the modern world more than the ancient one.; The presence of contradictions and repetitions does not necessarily prove separate sources, since they are "to be expected given the cultural background of the Old Testament and the long period of time during which the text was in formation and being passed on orally".; The documentary theory has been undermined by subdivisions of the sources and the addition of other sources, since: "The more sources one finds, the more tenuous the evidence for the existence of continuous documents becomes".; Another problem is posed by dating (see note 4). "The process of religious development is far more complex and uneven than Wellhausen imagined. Without his evolutionary assumptions, his dating of sources can no longer be accepted ... Several scholars over the past century have disagreed with Wellhausen's dates".; MacKenzie and Kaltner say "scholarly analysis is very much in a state of flux".)

Problems and criticisms of the Documentary hypothesis have been brought on by literary analysts who point out the error of judging ancient Eastern writings as if they were the products of western European Protestants; and by advances in anthropology that undermined Wellhausen's assumptions about how cultures develop; and also by various archaeological findings showing the cultural environment of the early Hebrews was more advanced than Wellhausen thought. (Note: Don Richardson writes that Wellhausen's theory was, in part, a derivative of an anthropological theory popular in the nineteenth century known as Tylor's theory.: Written in 1870, Edward Burnett Tylor's theory was an evolutionary model asserting three stages of development in religion from animism to polytheism to monotheism which followed the cultural stratification that came with monarchy. Lewis M. Hopfe says: "Tylor's theories were widely accepted and regarded as classic for many years".; It remained the dominant theory until Wilhelm Schmidt produced a study on "native monotheism" in 1912 titled Ursprung Der Gottesidee (The Origin of the Concept of God) demonstrating the presence of monotheism in undeveloped primitive cultures.; Tylor's theory had, in the meantime, been picked up and used in other fields beyond anthropology. Wellhausen's hypothesis, for example, depends upon the notion that polytheism preceded monotheism in Judaism's development. Hence, "Wellhausen's theology is based upon an anthropological theory which most anthropologists no longer endorse".) As a result, few biblical scholars of the twenty-first century hold to Wellhausen's Documentary hypothesis in its classical form. As Nicholson says: "it is in sharp decline—some would say in a state of advanced rigor mortis—and new solutions are being argued and urged in its place". Yet no replacement has so far been agreed upon: "the work of Wellhausen, for all that it needs revision and development in detail, remains the securest basis for understanding the Pentateuch".

==== Source criticism of the New Testament: the synoptic problem ====
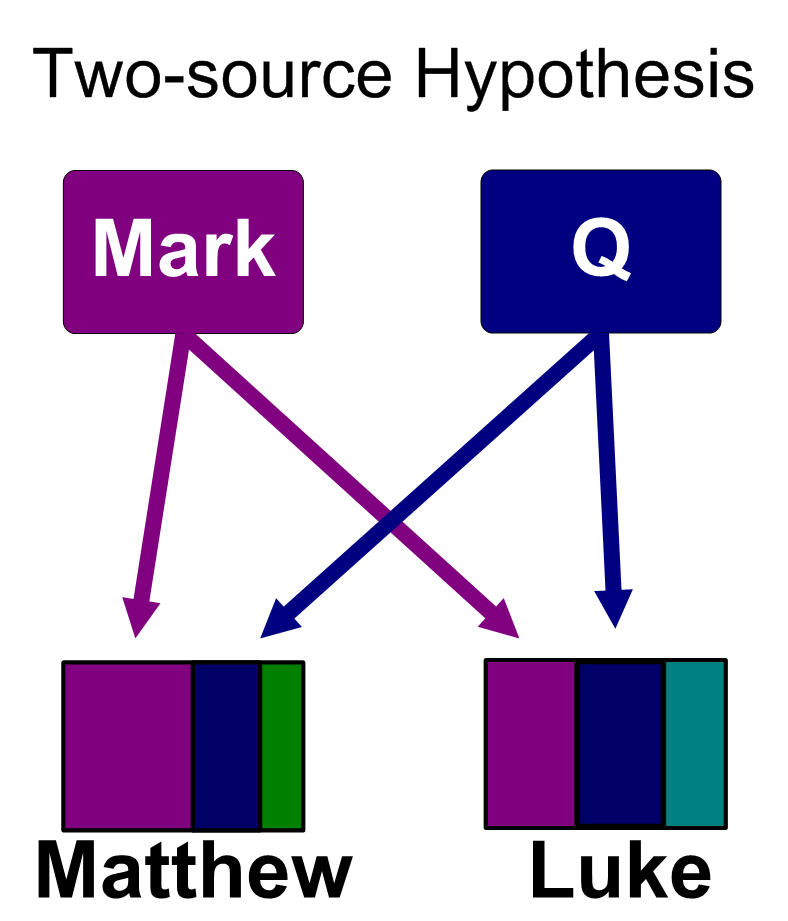
The widely accepted two-source hypothesis, showing two sources for both Matthew and Luke

B. H. Streeter's four-source hypothesis, showing four sources each for Matthew and Luke with the colors representing the different sources

In New Testament studies, source criticism has taken a slightly different approach from Old Testament studies by focusing on identifying the common sources of multiple texts instead of looking for the multiple sources of a single set of texts. The two-source hypothesis stands among one of the most influential and well-known theories of source criticism. Source criticism presents the Gospels as both products of sources and sources themselves, though recent scholarship tends to emphasize the evangelists' authorial creativity over finding pre-Gospel sources. As sources, Matthew, Mark and Luke are partially dependent on each other and partially independent of each other. This is called the synoptic problem, and explaining it is the single greatest dilemma of New Testament source criticism. Any explanation offered must "account for (a) what is common to all the Gospels; (b) what is common to any two of them; (c) what is peculiar to each". Multiple theories exist to address the dilemma, with none universally agreed upon, but the two-source hypothesis is the most common, though alternative hypotheses like Farrer are increasing in popularity.

Mark is the shortest of the four gospels with only 661 verses, but 600 of those verses are in Matthew and 350 of them are in Luke. Some of these verses are verbatim. Most scholars agree that this indicates Mark was a source for Matthew and Luke. There is also some verbatim agreement between Matthew and Luke of verses not found in Mark. A. M. Honoré offers a statistical classification of the number of words in the single, double, and triple traditions. In 1838, the religious philosopher Christian Hermann Weisse developed a theory about this. He postulated a hypothetical collection of the sayings of Jesus from an additional source called Q, taken from Quelle, which is German for "source".

If this document existed, it has now been lost, but some of its material can be deduced indirectly. There are five highly detailed arguments in favor of Q's existence: the verbal agreement of Mark and Luke, the order of the parables, the doublets, a discrepancy in the priorities of each gospel, and each one's internal coherence. The study of pre-Gospel sources is declining in scholarship, with most scholars rejecting unified M and L sources today. Biblical scholar B. H. Streeter used this insight to refine and expand the two-source theory into a four-source theory in 1925.

===== Two-source theory critique =====
While the two-source theory remains the most popular solution, others say it is not solved satisfactorily, with theories suggesting usage of Matthew by Luke or vice versa without Q increasing in popularity within scholarship. Donald Guthrie says no single theory offers a complete solution as there are complex and important difficulties that create challenges to every theory. One example is Basil Christopher Butler's challenge to the legitimacy of two-source theory, arguing it contains a Lachmann fallacy that says the two-source theory loses cohesion when it is acknowledged that no source can be established for Mark. F. C. Grant posits multiple sources for the Gospels.

=== Form criticism ===
Form criticism began in the early twentieth century when theologian Karl Ludwig Schmidt observed that Mark's Gospel is composed of short units. Schmidt asserted these small units were remnants and evidence of the oral tradition that preceded the writing of the gospels. Bible scholar Richard Bauckham says this "most significant insight," which established the foundation of form criticism, has never been refuted. Hermann Gunkel (1862–1932) and Martin Dibelius (1883–1947) built from this insight and pioneered form criticism. By the 1950s and 1960s, Rudolf Bultmann and form criticism were the "center of the theological conversation in both Europe and North America".

Form criticism breaks down biblical pasage into short units called pericopes, which are then classified by genre: prose or verse, letters, laws, court archives, war hymns, poems of lament, and so on. Form criticism then theorizes concerning the individual pericope's Sitz im Leben ("setting in life" or "place in life"). Based on their understanding of folklore, form critics believed the early Christian communities formed the sayings and teachings of Jesus themselves, according to their needs (their "situation in life"), and that each form could be identified by the situation in which it had been created and vice versa.

==== Critique of form criticism ====
In the early- to mid- twentieth century, form critics thought finding oral "laws of development" within the New Testament would prove the form critic's assertions that the texts had evolved within the early Christian communities according to sitz im leben. Since Mark was believed to be the first gospel, the form critics looked for the addition of proper names for anonymous characters, indirect discourse being turned into direct quotation, and the elimination of Aramaic terms and forms, with details becoming more concrete in Matthew, and then more so in Luke. Instead, in the 1970s, New Testament scholar E. P. Sanders wrote that: "There are no hard and fast laws of the development of the Synoptic tradition... On all counts the tradition developed in opposite directions. It became both longer and shorter, both more and less detailed, and both more and less Semitic". (Note: Sanders explains: 1. The form critics did not derive laws of transmission from a study of folk literature as many think.; 2. They derived them by two methods: (a) by assuming that purity of form indicates antiquity, and (b) by determining how Matthew and Luke used Mark and Q, and how the later literature used the canonical gospels.; 3. The first method is based on a priori considerations.; 4. In so far as it depends on the use of Mark and Q by Matthew and Luke, the second is circular and therefore questionable.; 5. The two are sometimes in direct conflict, although the form critics did not observe this.; 6. In any case the form critics did not derive the laws from or apply the laws to the Gospels systematically, nor did they carry out a systematic investigation of changes in the post-canonical literature.)

Scholars from the 1970s and into the 1990s, produced an "explosion of studies" on structure, genre, text-type, setting and language that challenged several of form criticism's aspects and assumptions. (Note: Burridge says: "The analogy between the development of the gospel pericopae and folklore needed reconsideration because of developments in folklore studies: it was less easy to assume steady growth of an oral tradition in stages; significant steps were sometimes large and sudden; the length of time needed for the 'laws' of oral transmission to operate, such as the centuries of Old Testament or Homeric transmission, was greater than that taken by the gospels; even the existence of such laws was questioned...; Further the transition from individual units of oral tradition into a written document had an important effect on the interpretation of the material. See also:) For example, the period of the twentieth century dominated by form criticism is marked by Bultmann's extreme skepticism concerning what can be known about the historical Jesus and his sayings. Some form critics assumed these same skeptical presuppositions based largely on their understanding of oral transmission and folklore. During the latter half of the twentieth century, field studies of cultures with existing oral traditions directly impacted many of these presuppositions. In 1978, research by linguists Milman Parry and Albert Bates Lord was used to undermine Gunkel's belief that "short narratives evolved into longer cycles". Within these oral cultures, literacy did not replace memory in a natural evolution. Instead, writing was used to enhance memory in an overlap of written and oral tradition. Susan Niditch concluded from her orality studies that: "no longer are many scholars convinced ... that the most seemingly oral-traditional or formulaic pieces are earliest in date". In this manner, compelling evidence developed against the form critical belief that Jesus's sayings were formed by Christian communities. As John Niles indicates, the "older idea of 'an ideal folk community—an undifferentiated company of rustics, each of whom contributes equally to the process of oral tradition,' is no longer tenable". According to Eddy and Boyd, these various conclusions directly undermine assumptions about Sitz im leben: "In light of what we now know of oral traditions, no necessary correlation between [the literary] forms and life situations [sitz im leben] can be confidently drawn".

Form critics assumed the early Church was heavily influenced by the Hellenistic culture that surrounded first-century Palestine, but in the 1970s, Sanders, as well as Gerd Theissen, sparked new rounds of studies that included anthropological and sociological perspectives, reestablishing Judaism as the predominant influence on Jesus, Paul, and the New Testament. New Testament scholar N. T. Wright says, "The earliest traditions of Jesus reflected in the Gospels are written from the perspective of Second Temple Judaism [and] must be interpreted from the standpoint of Jewish eschatology and apocalypticism".

According to religion scholar Werner H. Kelber, form critics throughout the mid-twentieth century were so focused on finding each pericope's original form, that they were distracted from any serious consideration of memory as a dynamic force in the construction of the gospels or the early church community tradition. What Kelber refers to as the "astounding myopia" of the form critics has revived interest in memory as an analytical category within biblical criticism.

For some, the many challenges to form criticism mean its future is in doubt. (Note: Tony Campbell says, "form criticism has a future "if its past is allowed a decent burial"; Martin Rösel writes that form criticism no longer has the high status it had in the past; Erhard Blum observes problems, and he wonders if one can speak of a current form-critical method at all; Bob Becking calls the question of the validity of Sitz im Leben "problematic"; Thomas Römer questions the assumption that form reflects any socio-historical reality; Such is the question asked by Won Lee: "one wonders whether Gunkel's form criticism is still viable today".) Bible scholar Tony Campbell says:

Form criticism had a meteoric rise in the early part of the twentieth century and fell from favor toward its end. For some, the future of form criticism is not an issue: it has none. But if form criticism embodies an essential insight, it will continue... Two concerns ... give it its value: concern for the nature of the text and for its shape and structure. ... If the encrustations can be scraped away, the good stuff may still be there.

=== Redaction criticism ===
Redaction is the process of editing multiple sources, often with a similar theme, into a single document. It was derived from a combination of both source and form criticism. As in source criticism, it is necessary to identify the traditions before determining how the redactor used them. Form critics saw the synoptic writers as mere collectors and focused on the Sitz im Leben as the creator of the texts, whereas redaction critics have dealt more positively with the Gospel writers, asserting an understanding of them as theologians of the early church. Redaction critics reject source and form criticism's description of the Bible texts as mere collections of fragments. Where form critics fracture the biblical elements into smaller and smaller individual pieces, redaction critics attempt to interpret the whole literary unit.

Norman Perrin defines redaction criticism as "the study of the theological motivation of an author as it is revealed in the collection, arrangement, editing, and modification of traditional material, and in the composition of new material ... redaction criticism directs us to the author as editor." Redaction criticism developed after World War II in Germany and arrived in England and North America by the 1950s. It focuses on discovering how and why the literary units were originally edited—"redacted"—into their final forms.

==== Redaction Critique ====
Redaction critics assume an extreme skepticism toward the historicity of Jesus and the gospels, just as form critics do, which has been seen by some scholars as a bias. The process of redaction seeks the historical community of the final redactors of the gospels, though there are often no textual clues. Porter and Adams say the redactive method of finding the final editor's theology is flawed. In the New Testament, redaction critics attempt to discern the original author/evangelist's theology by focusing and relying upon the differences between the gospels, yet it is unclear whether every difference has theological meaning, how much meaning, or whether any given difference is a stylistic or even an accidental change. Further, it is not at all clear whether the difference was made by the evangelist, who could have used the already changed story when writing a gospel. The evangelist's theology more likely depends on what the gospels have in common as well as their differences. Harrington says, "over-theologizing, allegorizing, and psychologizing are the major pitfalls encountered" in redaction criticism.

Followers of other theories concerning the Synoptic problem, such as those who support the Greisbach hypothesis which says Matthew was written first, Luke second, and Mark third, have pointed to weaknesses in the redaction-based arguments for the existence of Q and Markan priority. Mark Goodacre says "Some scholars have used the success of redaction criticism as a means of supporting the existence of Q, but this will always tend toward circularity, particularly given the hypothetical nature of Q which itself is reconstructed by means of redaction criticism".

=== Literary criticism ===
In the mid-twentieth century, literary criticism began to develop, shifting scholarly attention from historical and pre-compositional matters to the text itself, thereafter becoming the dominant form of biblical criticism in a relatively short period of about thirty years. It can be said to have begun in 1957 when literary critic Northrop Frye wrote an analysis of the Bible from the perspective of his literary background by using literary criticism to understand the Bible forms. Hans Frei proposed that "biblical narratives should be evaluated on their own terms" rather than by taking them apart in the manner we evaluate philosophy or historicity. Frei was one of several external influences that moved biblical criticism from a historical to a literary focus. New Testament scholar Paul R. House says the discipline of linguistics, new views of historiography, and the decline of older methods of criticism were also influential in that process.

By 1974, the two methodologies being used in literary criticism were rhetorical analysis and structuralism. Rhetorical analysis divides a passage into units, observes how a single unit shifts or breaks, taking special note of poetic devices, meter, parallelism, word play and so on. It then charts the writer's thought progression from one unit to the next, and finally, assembles the data in an attempt to explain the author's intentions behind the piece. Critics of rhetorical analysis say there is a "lack of a well-developed methodology" and that it has a "tendency to be nothing more than an exercise in stylistics".

Structuralism looks at the language to discern "layers of meaning" with the goal of uncovering a work's "deep structures" – the premises as well as the purposes of the author. In 1981 literature scholar Robert Alter also contributed to the development of biblical literary criticism by publishing an influential analysis of biblical themes from a literary perspective. The 1980s saw the rise of formalism, which focuses on plot, structure, character and themes and the development of reader-response criticism which focuses on the reader rather than the author.

New Testament scholar Donald Guthrie highlights a flaw in the literary critical approach to the Gospels: the genre of the Gospels has not been fully determined. No conclusive evidence has yet been produced to settle the question of genre, and without genre, no adequate parallels can be found, and without parallels "it must be considered to what extent the principles of literary criticism are applicable". The validity of using the same critical methods for novels and for the Gospels, without the assurance the Gospels are actually novels, must be questioned.

==== Canonical criticism ====
As a type of literary criticism, canonical criticism has both theological and literary roots. Its origins are found in the Church's views of the biblical writings as sacred, and in the secular literary critics who began to influence biblical scholarship in the 1940s and 1950s. By the mid-twentieth century, the high level of departmentalization in biblical criticism, with its large volume of data and absence of applicable theology, had begun to produce a level of dissatisfaction among both scholars and faith communities. Brevard S. Childs (1923–2007) proposed an approach to bridge that gap that came to be called canonical criticism. Canonical criticism "signaled a major and enduring shift in biblical studies". Canonical criticism does not reject historical criticism, but it does reject its claim to "unique validity". John Barton says that canonical criticism does not simply ask what the text might have originally meant, it asks what it means to the current believing community, and it does so in a manner different from any type of historical criticism.

John H. Hayes and Carl Holladay say "canonical criticism has several distinguishing features": (1) Canonical criticism is synchronic; it sees all biblical writings as standing together in time instead of focusing on the diachronic questions of the historical approach. (2) Canonical critics approach the books as whole units instead of focusing on pieces. They accept that many texts have been composed over long periods of time, but the canonical critic wishes "to interpret the last edition of a biblical book" and then relate books to each other. (3) Canonical criticism opposes form criticism's isolation of individual passages from their canonical setting. (4) Canonical criticism emphasizes the relationship between the text and its reader in an effort to reclaim the relationship between the texts and how they were used in the early believing communities. Canonical critics focus on reader interaction with the biblical writing. (5) "Canonical criticism is overtly theological in its approach". Critics are interested in what the text means for the community—"the community of faith whose predecessors produced the canon, that was called into existence by the canon, and seeks to live by the canon".

==== Rhetorical criticism ====
Rhetorical criticism is also a type of literary criticism. While James Muilenburg (1896–1974) is often referred to as "the prophet of rhetorical criticism", it is Herbert A. Wichelns who is credited with "creating the modern discipline of rhetorical criticism" with his 1925 essay "The Literary Criticism of Oratory". In that essay, Wichelns says that rhetorical criticism and other types of literary criticism differ from each other because rhetorical criticism is only concerned with "effect. It regards a speech as a communication to a specific audience, and holds its business to be the analysis and appreciation of the orator's method of imparting his ideas to his hearers". Rhetorical criticism is a qualitative analysis. This qualitative analysis involves three primary dimensions: (1) analyzing the act of criticism and what it does; (2) analyzing what goes on within the rhetoric being analyzed and what is created by that rhetoric; and (3) understanding the processes involved in all of it. Sonja K. Foss discusses ten different methods of rhetorical criticism in her book Rhetorical Criticism: Exploration and Practice saying that each method will produce different insights.

Biblical rhetorical criticism makes use of understanding the "forms, genres, structures, stylistic devices and rhetorical techniques" common to the Near Eastern literature of the different ages when the separate books of biblical literature were written. It attempts to discover and evaluate the rhetorical devices, language, and methods of communication used within the texts by focusing on the use of "repetition, parallelism, strophic structure, motifs, climax, chiasm and numerous other literary devices". Phyllis Trible, a student of Muilenburg, has become one of the leaders of rhetorical criticism and is known for her detailed literary analysis and her feminist critique of biblical interpretation.

==== Narrative criticism ====
In the last half of the twentieth century, historical critics began to recognize that being limited to the historical meant the Bible was not being studied in the manner of other ancient writings. In 1974, Hans Frei pointed out that a historical focus neglects the "narrative character" of the gospels. Critics began asking if these texts should be understood on their own terms before being used as evidence of something else. According to Mark Allen Powell the difficulty in understanding the gospels on their own terms is determining what those terms are: "The problem with treating the gospels 'just like any other book' is that the gospels are not like any other book". The New Critics, (whose views were absorbed by narrative criticism), rejected the idea that background information holds the key to the meaning of the text, and asserted that meaning and value reside within the text itself. It is now accepted as "axiomatic in literary circles that the meaning of literature transcends the historical intentions of the author".

As a form of literary criticism, narrative criticism approaches scripture as story. Christopher T. Paris says that, "narrative criticism admits the existence of sources and redactions but chooses to focus on the artistic weaving of these materials into a sustained narrative picture".

Narrative criticism was first used to study the New Testament in the 1970s, with the works of David Rhoads, Jack D. Kingsbury, R. Alan Culpepper, and Robert C. Tannehill. A decade later, this new approach in biblical criticism included the Old Testament as well. The first article labeled narrative criticism was "Narrative Criticism and the Gospel of Mark," published in 1982 by Bible scholar David Rhoads. Stephen D. Moore has written that "as a term, narrative criticism originated within biblical studies", but its method was borrowed from narratology. It was also influenced by New Criticism which saw each literary work as a freestanding whole with intrinsic meaning. Sharon Betsworth says Robert Alter's work is what adapted New Criticism to the Bible. Scholars such as Robert Alter and Frank Kermode sought to teach readers to "appreciate the Bible itself by training attention on its artfulness—how [the text] orchestrates sound, repetition, dialogue, allusion, and ambiguity to generate meaning and effect".

== Legacy ==
Ken and Richard Soulen say that "biblical criticism has permanently altered the way people understand the Bible". One way of understanding this change is to see it as a cultural enterprise. Jonathan Sheehan has argued that critical study meant the Bible had to become a primarily cultural instrument. It could no longer be a Catholic Bible or a Lutheran Bible but had to be divested of its scriptural character within specific confessional hermeneutics. As a result, the Bible is no longer thought of solely as a religious artifact, and its interpretation is no longer restricted to the community of believers. The Bible's cultural impact is studied in multiple academic fields, producing not only the cultural Bible, but the modern academic Bible as well. Soulen adds that biblical criticism's "leading practitioners ... have set standards of industry, acumen, and insight that remain pace-setting today."

Biblical criticism made study of the Bible more secularized, scholarly, and democratic. It began to be recognized that "Literature was written not just for the dons of Oxford and Cambridge, but also for common folk... Opposition to authority, especially ecclesiastical [church authority], was widespread, and religious tolerance was on the increase". Old orthodoxies were questioned and radical views tolerated. Scholars began writing in their common languages making their works available to a larger public.

In this way, biblical criticism also led to conflict. Many like Roy A. Harrisville believe biblical criticism was created by those hostile to the Bible. There are aspects of biblical criticism that have not only been hostile to the Bible, but also to the religions whose scripture it is, in both intent and effect. So biblical criticism became, in the perception of many, an assault on religion, especially Christianity, through the "autonomy of reason" which it espoused. Part of the legacy of biblical criticism is that, as it rose, it led to the decline of biblical authority. J. W. Rogerson summarizes:

By 1800 historical criticism in Germany had reached the point where Genesis had been divided into two or more sources, the unity of authorship of Isaiah and Daniel had been disputed, the interdependence of the first three gospels had been demonstrated, and miraculous elements in the OT and NT [Old and New Testaments] had been explained as resulting from the primitive or pre-scientific outlook of the biblical writers.

Jeffrey Burton Russell describes it thus: "Faith was transferred from the words of scripture itself to those of influential biblical critics ... liberal Christianity retreated hastily before the advance of science and biblical criticism. By the end of the eighteenth century, advanced liberals had abandoned the core of Christian beliefs." This created an "intellectual crisis" in American Christianity of the early twentieth century which led to a backlash against the critical approach. This backlash produced a fierce internal battle for control of local churches, national denominations, divinity schools and seminaries.

On one hand, Rogerson says that "historical criticism is not inherently inimical to Christian belief". On the other hand, as Michael Fishbane frankly wrote in 1992, "No longer are we sustained within a biblical matrix... The labor of many centuries has expelled us from this edenic womb and its wellsprings of life and knowledge... [The] Bible has lost its ancient authority". The most profound legacy of the loss of biblical authority is the formation of the modern world itself, according to religion and ethics scholar Jeffrey Stout. "There are those who regard the desacralization of the Bible as the fortunate condition for the rise of new sensibilities and modes of imagination" that went into developing the modern world. For many, biblical criticism "released a host of threats" to the Christian faith. For others biblical criticism "proved to be a failure, due principally to the assumption that diachronic, linear research could master any and all of the questions and problems attendant on interpretation". Still others believed that biblical criticism, "shorn of its unwarranted arrogance," could be a reliable source of interpretation.

Fishbane asserts that the significant question for those who continue in any community of Jewish or Christian faith is, after 200 years of biblical criticism: can the text still be seen as sacred? "[T]his question affects our innermost cultural being and traces our relationship to the foundational text of our religious and cultural origins". He compares biblical criticism to Job, a prophet who destroyed "self-serving visions for the sake of a more honest crossing from the divine textus to the human one". Or as Rogerson says: biblical criticism has been liberating for those who want their faith "intelligently grounded and intellectually honest".

Fishbane writes:

the traditional sacrality of the Bible is at once simple and symbolic, individual and communal, practical and paradoxical. But times have changed... [In the twenty-first century,] [c]an the notion of a sacred text be retrieved? ... It is arguably one of Judaism's greatest contributions to the history of religions to assert that the divine Reality is communicated to mankind through words... our hermeneutical hope is in the indissoluble link between the divine and human textus... It is at such points that the ancient theophanic power of illimitable divinity may yet breakthrough swollen words... Thus, ... we may say that the Bible itself may help to retrieve the notion of a sacred text.

By the end of the twentieth century, multiple new points of view changed biblical criticism's central concepts and its goals, leading to the development of a group of new and different biblical-critical disciplines.

=== Non-liberal Protestant criticism ===
One legacy of biblical criticism in American culture is the American fundamentalist movement of the 1920s and 1930s. Fundamentalism began, at least partly, as a response to the biblical criticism of nineteenth century liberalism. Some fundamentalists believed liberal critics had invented an entirely new religion "completely at odds with the Christian faith". There have also been conservative Protestants who accepted biblical criticism, and this too is part of biblical criticism's legacy. William Robertson Smith (1846–1894) is an example of a nineteenth century evangelical who believed historical criticism was a legitimate outgrowth of the Protestant Reformation's focus on the biblical text. He saw it as a "necessary tool to enable intelligent churchgoers" to understand the Bible, and was a pioneer in establishing the final form of the supplementary hypothesis of the documentary hypothesis. A similar view was later advocated by the Primitive Methodist biblical scholar A. S. Peake (1865–1929). Conservative Protestant scholars have continued the tradition of contributing to critical scholarship. Mark Noll says that "in recent years, a steadily growing number of well qualified and widely published scholars have broadened and deepened the impact of evangelical scholarship". Edwin M. Yamauchi is a recognized expert on Gnosticism; Gordon Fee has done exemplary work in textual criticism; Richard Longenecker is a student of Jewish-Christianity and the theology of Paul. "[It] is safe to conclude that in many measurable features contemporary evangelical scholarship on the scriptures enjoys a considerable good health".

=== Catholic criticism ===
Throughout the seventeenth and eighteenth centuries, Catholic theology avoided biblical criticism because of its reliance on rationalism, preferring instead to engage in traditional exegesis, based on the works of the Church Fathers. Notable exceptions to this included Richard Simon, Ignaz von Döllinger and the Bollandist.

The Church showed strong opposition to biblical criticism during that period. Frequent political revolutions, bitter opposition of "liberalism" to the Church, and the expulsion of religious orders from France and Germany, made the church understandably suspicious of the new intellectual currents. In his 1829 encyclical Traditi humilitati, Pope Pius VIII lashed against "those who publish the Bible with new interpretations contrary to the Church's laws", arguing that they were "skillfully distort[ing] the meaning by their own interpretation", in order to "ensure that the reader imbibes their lethal poison instead of the saving water of salvation". In 1864, Pope Pius IX promulgated the encyclical letter Quanta cura ("Condemning Current Errors"), which decried what the Pontiff considered significant errors afflicting the modern age. These he listed in an attachment called Syllabus Errorum ("Syllabus of Errors"), which, among other things, condemned rationalistic interpretations of the Bible. Similarly, the dogmatic constitution Dei Filius ("Son of God"), approved by the First Vatican Council in 1871, rejected biblical criticism, reaffirming that the Bible was written by God and that it was inerrant.

That began to change in the final decades of the nineteenth century when, in 1890, the French Dominican Marie-Joseph Lagrange (1855–1938) established a school in Jerusalem called the École prátique d'études biblique, which became the École Biblique in 1920, to encourage study of the Bible using the historical-critical method. Two years later, Lagrange funded a journal (Revue Biblique), spoke at various conferences, wrote Bible commentaries that incorporated textual critical work of his own, did pioneering work on biblical genres and forms, and laid the path to overcoming resistance to the historical-critical method among his fellow scholars.

On 18 November 1893, Pope Leo XIII promulgated the encyclical letter Providentissimus Deus ('The most provident God'). The letter gave the first formal authorization for the use of critical methods in biblical scholarship. "Hence it is most proper that Professors of Sacred Scripture and theologians should master those tongues in which the sacred Books were originally written, and have a knowledge of natural science. He recommended that the student of scripture be first given a sound grounding in the interpretations of the Fathers such as Tertullian, Cyprian, Hilary, Ambrose, Leo the Great, Gregory the Great, Augustine and Jerome, and understand what they interpreted literally, and what allegorically; and note what they lay down as belonging to faith and what is opinion. Although Providentissimus Deus tried to encourage Catholic biblical studies, it created also problems. In the encyclical, Leo XIII excluded the possibility of restricting the inspiration and inerrancy of the bible to matters of faith and morals.

The situation precipitated after the election of Pope Pius X: a staunch traditionalist, Pius saw biblical criticism as part of a growing destructive modernist tendency in the Church. Thus, he explicitly condemned it in the papal syllabus Lamentabili sane exitu ("With truly lamentable results") and in his papal encyclical Pascendi Dominici gregis ("Feeding the Lord's Flock"), which labelled it as heretical. The École Biblique and the Revue Biblique were shut down and Lagrange was called back to France in 1912.

Following Pius's death, Pope Benedict XV once again condemned rationalistic biblical criticism in his papal encyclical Spiritus Paraclitus ("Paraclete Spirit, but also took a more moderate line than his predecessor, allowing Lagrange to return to Jerusalem and reopen his school and journal.

In 1943, on the fiftieth anniversary of the Providentissimus Deus, Pope Pius XII issued the papal encyclical Divino Afflante Spiritu ('Inspired by the Holy Spirit') sanctioning historical criticism, opening a new epoch in Catholic critical scholarship. The Jesuit Augustin Bea (1881–1968) had played a vital part in its publication. The dogmatic constitution Dei verbum ("Word of God"), approved by the Second Vatican Council and promulgated by Pope Paul VI in 1965 furtherly sanctioned biblical criticism.

Raymond E. Brown, Joseph A. Fitzmyer and Roland E. Murphy were the most famous Catholic scholars to apply biblical criticism and the historical-critical method in analyzing the Bible: together, they authored The Jerome Biblical Commentary and The New Jerome Biblical Commentary the later of which is still one of the most used textbooks in Catholic Seminaries of the United States. The Jerome Biblical Commentary for the Twenty-First Century, a third fully revised edition, will be published in 2022 and will be edited by John J. Collins, Gina Hens-Piazza, Barbara Reid and Donald Senior.

This tradition is continued by Catholic scholars such as John P. Meier, and Conleth Kearns, who also worked with Reginald C. Fuller and Leonard Johnston preparing A New Catholic Commentary on Holy Scripture. Meier is also the author of a multi-volume work on the historical Jesus, A Marginal Jew.

=== Jewish criticism ===
Biblical criticism posed unique difficulties for Judaism. Some Jewish scholars, such as rabbinicist Solomon Schechter, did not participate in biblical criticism because they saw criticism of the Pentateuch as a threat to Jewish identity. The growing anti-semitism in Germany of the late nineteenth and early twentieth centuries, the perception that higher criticism was an entirely Protestant Christian pursuit, and the sense that many Bible critics were not impartial academics but were proponents of supersessionism, prompted Schechter to describe "Higher Criticism as Higher Anti-semitism".

One of the earliest historical-critical Jewish scholars of Pentateuchal studies was M. M. Kalisch, who began work in the nineteenth century. In the early twentieth century, historical criticism of the Pentateuch became mainstream among Jewish scholars. In 1905, Rabbi David Zvi Hoffmann wrote an extensive, two-volume, philologically based critique of the Wellhausen theory, which supported Jewish orthodoxy. Bible professor Benjamin D. Sommer says it is "among the most precise and detailed commentaries on the legal texts [Leviticus and Deuteronomy] ever written". According to Aly Elrefaei, the strongest refutation of Wellhausen's Documentary theory came from Yehezkel Kaufmann in 1937. Kaufmann was the first Jewish scholar to fully exploit higher criticism to counter Wellhausen's theory. Wellhausen's and Kaufmann's methods were similar yet their conclusions were opposed. Mordechai Breuer, who branches out beyond most Jewish exegesis and explores the implications of historical criticism for multiple subjects, is an example of a twenty-first century Jewish biblical critical scholar.

=== Feminist criticism ===
Biblical criticism impacted feminism and was impacted by it. In the 1980s, Phyllis Trible and Elisabeth Schüssler Fiorenza reframed biblical criticism by challenging the supposed disinterest and objectivity it claimed for itself and exposing how ideological-theological stances had played a critical role in interpretation. For example, the patriarchal model of ancient Israel became an aspect of biblical criticism through the anthropology of the nineteenth century. Feminist scholars of second-wave feminism appropriated it. Third wave feminists began raising concerns about its accuracy. Carol L. Meyers says feminist archaeology has shown "male dominance was real; but it was fragmentary, not hegemonic" leading to a change in the anthropological description of ancient Israel as heterarchy rather than patriarchy.

Feminist criticism is an aspect of the feminist theology movement which began in the 1960s and 1970s as part of the feminist movement in the United States. Three phases of feminist biblical interpretation are connected to the three phases, or 'waves', of the movement. Feminist theology has since responded to globalization, making itself less specifically Western, thereby moving beyond its original narrative "as a movement defined by the USA". Feminist criticism embraces the inter-disciplinary approach to biblical criticism, encouraging a reader-response approach to the text that includes an attitude of "dissent" or "resistance".

=== Postcolonial biblical criticism ===
In the mid to late 1990s, a global response to the changes in biblical criticism began to coalesce as "Postcolonial biblical criticism". Fernando F. Segovia and Stephen D. Moore postulate that it emerged from "liberation hermeneutics, or extra-biblical Postcolonial studies, or even from historical biblical criticism, or from all three sources at once". It has a focus on the indigenous and local with an eye toward recovering those aspects of culture that Colonialism had erased or suppressed. The Postcolonial view is rooted in a consciousness of the geopolitical situation for all people, and is "transhistorical and transcultural". According to Laura E. Donaldson, postcolonial criticism is oppositional and "multidimensional in nature, keenly attentive to the intricacies of the colonial situation in terms of culture, race, class and gender".

=== African-American biblical criticism ===
Biblical criticism produced profound changes in African-American culture. Vaughn A. Booker writes that, "Such developments included the introduction of the varieties of American metaphysical theology in sermons and songs, liturgical modifications [to accommodate] Holy Spirit possession presences through shouting and dancing, and musical changes". These changes would both "complement and reconfigure conventional African American religious life".

Michael Joseph Brown writes that African Americans responded to the assumption of universality in biblical criticism by challenging it. He says all Bible readings are contextual, in that readers bring with them their own context: perceptions and experiences harvested from social and cultural situations. African-American biblical criticism is based on liberation theology and black theology, and looks for what is potentially liberating in the texts.

=== Queer biblical hermeneutics ===
According to Episcopalian priest and queer theologian Patrick S. Cheng (Episcopal Divinity School): "Queer biblical hermeneutics is a way of looking at the sacred text through the eyes of queer people. It is important to understand the meaning of these terms in relation to the exegetical process."

=== Social scientific criticism ===
Social scientific criticism is part of the wider trend in biblical criticism to reflect interdisciplinary methods and diversity. It grew out of form criticism's Sitz im Leben and the sense that historical form criticism had failed to adequately analyze the social and anthropological contexts which form critics claimed had formed the texts. Using the perspectives, theories, models, and research of the social sciences to determine what social norms may have influenced the growth of biblical tradition, it is similar to historical biblical criticism in its goals and methods and has less in common with literary critical approaches. It analyzes the social and cultural dimensions of the text and its environmental context.

=== New historicism ===
New historicism emerged as traditional historical biblical criticism changed. Lois Tyson says this new form of historical criticism developed in the 1970s. It "rejects both traditional historicism's marginalization of literature and New Criticism's enshrinement of the literary text in a timeless dimension beyond history". Literary texts are seen as "cultural artifacts" that reveal context as well as content, and within New Historicism, the "literary text and the historical situation" are equally important".

=== Post-modern biblical criticism ===
Postmodern biblical criticism began after the 1940s and 1950s when the term postmodern came into use to signify a rejection of modern conventions. Many of these early postmodernist views came from France following World War II. Postmodernism has been associated with Sigmund Freud, radical politics, and arguments against metaphysics and ideology. It questions anything that claims "objectively secured foundations, universals, metaphysics, or analytical dualism". Biblical scholar A. K. M. Adam says postmodernism has three general features: 1) it denies any privileged starting point for truth; 2) it is critical of theories that attempt to explain the "totality of reality;" and 3) it attempts to show that all ideals are grounded in ideological, economic or political self-interest.

=== Post-critical interpretation ===
Post-critical interpretation, according to Ken and Richard Soulen, "shares postmodernism's suspicion of modern claims to neutral standards of reason, but not its hostility toward theological interpretation". It begins with the understanding that biblical criticism's focus on historicity produced a distinction between the meaning of what the text says and what it is about (what it historically references). The biblical scholar Hans Frei wrote that what he refers to as the "realistic narratives" of literature, including the Bible, do not allow for such separation. Subject matter is identical to verbal meaning and is found in plot and nowhere else. "As Frei puts it, scripture 'simultaneously depicts and renders the reality (if any) of what it talks about'; its subject matter is 'constituted by, or identical with, its narrative".
