= Benedict T. Viviano =

American New Testament scholar and author

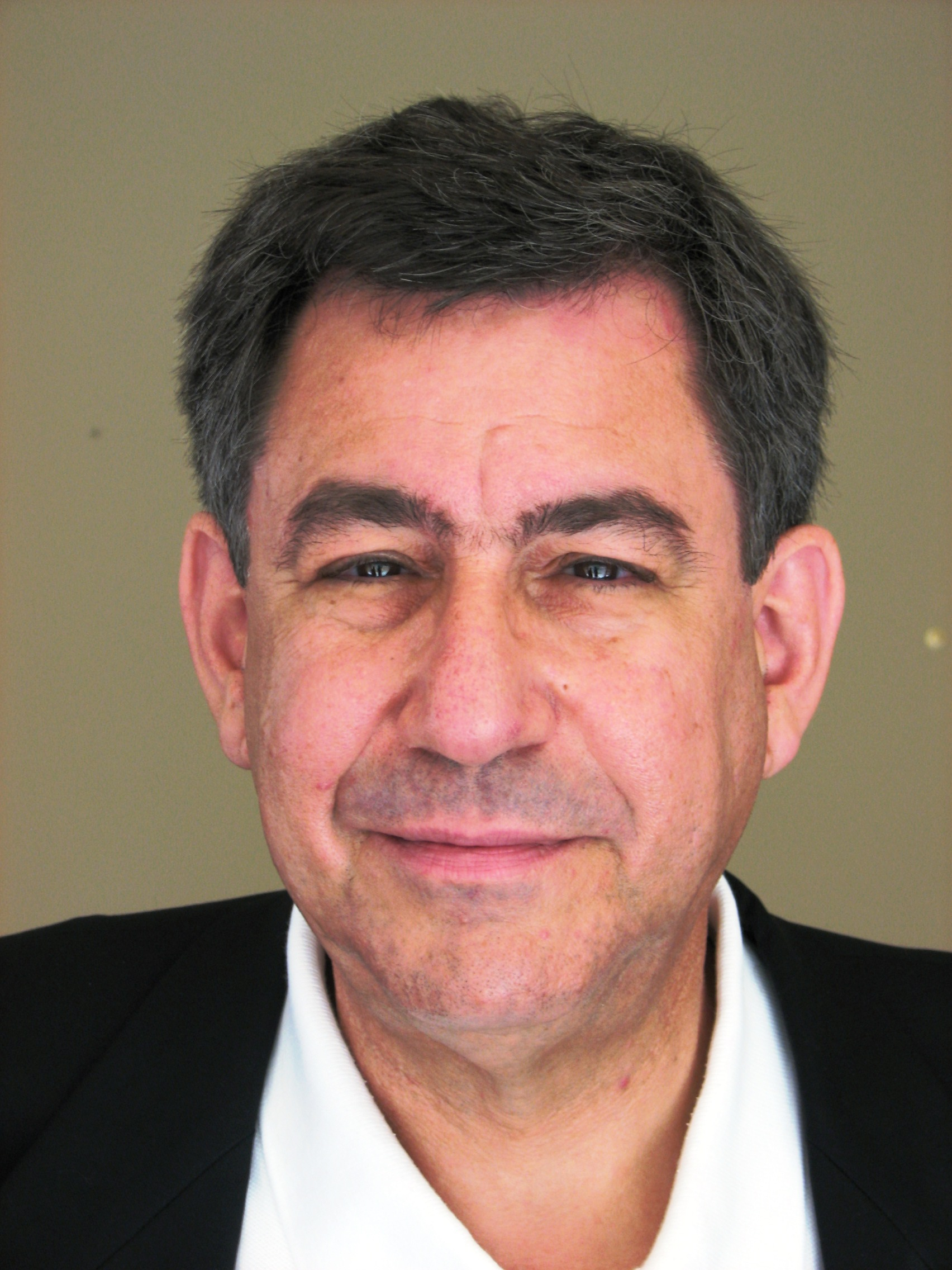
- Benedict Viviano
- Born: January 22, 1940 (age 86); St Louis, Missouri
- Died: May 24, 2023 (aged 83)

Academic work
- Institutions: University of Fribourg Ecole Biblique Aquinas Institute of Theology
- Notable works: The Kingdom of God in History

Benedict Thomas Viviano OP (January 22, 1940 – May 24, 2023) a New Testament scholar and author, was a member of the Chicago Province of the Dominican Order of the Roman Catholic Church. He was on the faculty of the University of Fribourg, Switzerland, as a full professor of New Testament, teaching in the French language. Before teaching in Fribourg, he taught for 11 years at the Ecole Biblique in Jerusalem, and 12 years at Aquinas Institute of Theology in St. Louis. He was vice president of the Tantur Ecumenical Institute for Theological Studies in Jerusalem.

He was probably best known for his book The Kingdom of God in History and the St. Matthew section of the New Jerome Bible Commentary.

== Early life ==
Viviano was born in St Louis. In a city of French foundation but mainly German population with a strong African American minority, his family belonged to the city's community of Italian people, itself divided into Lombards and Sicilians. He went to Christian Brothers College High School in St. Louis. After two years of university, he entered the Dominican order in 1959 and was ordained a priest in 1966.

Viviano had been interested in Scripture since the age of 12, and was assigned to write a doctorate in that subject. His education included studies in Washington, D.C. (the Catholic University of America), Boston (Harvard University), Durham, North Carolina (Duke University), Rome (Pontifical Biblical Institute), and Jerusalem (Ecole Biblique). He spent shorter times at a rabbinical seminary in Cincinnati and at University of Tübingen and University of Vienna.

== Career ==
His teaching life was divided into three main periods, each of about 12 years: first in the United States at a Dominican faculty of theology, in close collaboration with a Lutheran and a Reformed seminary. He had a strong interest in ecumenism and also an interest in Judaism, and so had served on dialogue teams for various bishops' conferences and for the Vatican. His second teaching period was in Jerusalem. His third period of teaching, was at the University of Fribourg in Switzerland, where he was a full ordinarius professor for New Testament in French, since 1995. He retired as Professor Emeritus of the University of Fribourg to the Dominikanerkonvent Rosenkranzbasilika St. Maria Rotunda Postgasse 4 A-1010 Vienna, Austria. Viviano also spent the fall semester each year at Aquinas Institute, 23 S. Spring Avenue St. Louis, Missouri.

His special interests were in the Gospel according to Matthew and its Jewish background, and, for biblical theological themes, the kingdom of God in history. He also had an interest in the religious value of study and intellectual life. He therefore mentored others who felt called to pursue studies, and offered counsel as to where to study and with whom.

Besides having published books and essays in these areas, Viviano’s side interests included the relation between Matthew and the Gospel according to John the Evangelist, a theology of democracy, the philosophy of history (Hegel), the theology of hope. Retired as a full professor in 2008, Viviano continued to lecture and to write.

According to the author, his most important works were "Study as Worship"; the "Commentary on Matthew in the New Jerome Biblical Commentary" and "The Kingdom of God in History."

== Teaching experience ==
- 1972-1976 Instructor in New Testament, Aquinas Institute of Theology, Dubuque, Iowa
- 1976-1978 Assistant Professor of New Testament, Aquinas Institute of Theology, Dubuque, Iowa
- 1978-1981 Professor of New Testament, Aquinas Institute of Theology, Dubuque, Iowa.
- 1981-1984: Professor of New Testament, Aquinas Institute, St. Louis
- 1984-1995: Professor of New Testament, Ecole Biblique, Jerusalem (1989: full professor ordinarius)
- 1995-2008: Professor of New Testament, University of Fribourg, Switzerland

== Educational background ==
- 1962 - BA (Philosophy), Aquinas Institute of Philosophy, River Forest.
- 1963 - MA (Philosophy), Aquinas Institute of Philosophy, River Forest, Illinois.
- 1966 - MA (Theology), Aquinas Institute of Theology, Dubuque, Iowa.
- 1967 - ST.Lic., S.T.Lr. (Theology), Pontifical Faculty of the Immaculate Conception, Washington, D.C.
- 1969 - SSB (New Testament), Pontifical Biblical Institute, Rome, Italy.
- 1976 - PhD (Bible), Duke University, Durham, North Carolina.
- 1977 - SSL Pontifical Biblical Commission, Rome, Italy (cum mentione speciali).

== Selected works ==
=== Books ===
- Viviano, Benedict T. (1978). Study as Worship: Aboth and the New Testament. Studies in Judaism in Late Antiquity. Vol. 26. Leiden: Brill. ISBN 9789004057753. OCLC 4628714.
- ——— (1988). The Kingdom of God in History. Good News Studies. Vol. 27. Wilmington, DE: Michael Glazier. ISBN 9780894536007. OCLC 17843258.
- ——— (2001). Trinity-Kingdom-Church: Essays in Biblical Theology. Novum Testamentum et Orbis Antiquus. Vol. 48. Fribourg: Academic Press. ISBN 9783727813627. OCLC 49329764.
- ——— (2007). Matthew and His World: The Gospel of the Open Jewish Christians Studies in Biblical Theology. Novum Testamentum et Orbis Antiquus. Vol. 61. Fribourg: Academic Press.
- ——— (2014). Catholic Hermeneutics Today: Critical Essays. Eugene, OR: Cascade. ISBN 9781625644183. OCLC 896496647.

=== As editor ===
- ———; Wigoder, Geoffrey; et al., eds. (1986). Illustrated Dictionary and Concordance of the Bible. New York & London: Macmillan & Collier Macmillan. ISBN 9780029163801. OCLC 13820794. - editor of the NT section.

=== Chapters ===
- ——— (1978). "Roman Catholic Appraisal of the Chicago Call". In Webber, Robert E.; Bloesch, Donald (eds.). The Orthodox Evangelicals. New York: Nelson. pp. 225–33. ISBN 9780840756541. OCLC 4056109.
- Viviano, Benedict T. (1990). "Commentary on Matthew". In Brown, Raymond E.; Fitzmyer, Joseph A.; Murphy, Roland E. (eds.). New Jerome Biblical Commentary (Revision of Jerome Biblical Commentary ed.). Englewood Cliffs, NJ: Prentice-Hall. ISBN 9780136149347. OCLC 19388491.
- Viviano, Benedict T. (2008). "The Normativity of Scripture and Tradition in Recent Catholic Theology". In Bockmuehl, Markus; Torrance, Alan J. (eds.). Scripture's Doctrine and Theology's Bible: How the New Testament Shapes Christian Dogmatics. Grand Rapids, MI: Baker Academic. pp. 125–140.

=== Journal articles ===
- ——— (2008). "The Adoration of the Magi: Matthew 2:1-23 and Theological Aesthetics". Revue Biblique. 115 (3): 546–67.
