= Oxford Bible =

Oxford Bible may refer to:

- The standard version of the King James Bible, first published in 1769
- Oxford Annotated Bible, a study Bible first published in 1962
- Other bibles published by the Oxford University Press

== See also ==
- Oxford Vulgate
