= Raymond E. Brown =

American biblical scholar (1928–1998)

The Rev. Dr. Raymond E. Brown PSS
- Born: May 22, 1928; New York City, U.S.
- Died: August 8, 1998 (aged 70); Menlo Park, California, U.S.
- Occupations: Biblical scholar, Catholic priest in Society of Saint-Sulpice
- Years active: 1955–1998
- Known for: First tenured Catholic scholar at Union Theological Seminary

Academic background
- Education: St. Mary's University, Baltimore
- Thesis: The Sensus Plenior of Sacred Scripture (1955)

Raymond Edward Brown PSS (May 22, 1928 – August 8, 1998) was an American Sulpician priest and prominent biblical scholar. He was a specialist on the hypothetical Johannine community, which he speculated contributed to the authorship of the Gospel of John, and he also wrote studies on the birth and death of Jesus.

Brown was professor emeritus at Union Theological Seminary (UTS) in New York City, where he taught for 29 years. He was the first Catholic professor to gain tenure there, where he earned a reputation as a superior lecturer.

== Life ==
Born in New York City, the son of Robert H. and Loretta Brown, Raymond studied at the Catholic University of America in Washington, D.C., where he received a bachelor's degree in 1948 and a Master of Arts degree in 1949 as a Basselin scholar. In 1953, he was ordained a Catholic priest for the Diocese of St. Augustine. In 1955, he joined the Society of Saint-Sulpice following his reception of a doctorate in Sacred Theology from St. Mary's Seminary in Baltimore. He earned a second doctorate in Semitic languages in 1958 from Johns Hopkins University, where one of his advisors was William F. Albright.

Following his studies, Brown taught at his alma mater, St. Mary's Seminary, until 1971. During this period, he was a research fellow at the American Schools of Oriental Research in Jerusalem, where he worked on a concordance of the Dead Sea Scrolls. In 1963, he served as an expert adviser, known as a peritus, to Joseph P. Hurley, the Bishop of St. Augustine, at the Second Vatican Council.

Brown was appointed in 1972 to the Pontifical Biblical Commission and again in 1996. He was the Auburn Distinguished Professor of Biblical Studies at the Union Theological Seminary in New York City, where he taught from 1971 until 1990, when he retired with the title of professor emeritus. He served as the President of the Catholic Biblical Association, the Society of Biblical Literature (1976–77), and the Society of New Testament Studies (1986–87). Brown was awarded 24 honorary doctoral degrees by universities in the United States and Europe, including many from Protestant institutions.

Brown died at Saint Patrick's Seminary and University in Menlo Park, California. The Archbishop of Los Angeles, Cardinal Roger Mahony hailed him as "the most distinguished and renowned Catholic biblical scholar to emerge in this country ever" and his death, the cardinal said, was "a great loss to the Church."

== Scholarly views ==
Brown was one of the first Catholic scholars in the United States to use the historical-critical method to study the Bible.

In 1943, reversing the approach that had existed since Pope Leo XIII's encyclical Providentissimus Deus 50 years earlier, Pope Pius XII's encyclical Divino afflante Spiritu expressed approval of historical-critical methods. For Brown, this was a "Magna Carta for biblical progress." In 1965, at the Second Vatican Council, the Church moved further in this direction, adopting the Dogmatic constitution on Divine Revelation, known as Dei verbum, which superseded the conservative schema, "On the Sources of Revelation", that originally had been submitted. While it stated that Scripture teaches "solidly, faithfully and without error that truth which God wanted put into sacred writings for the sake of salvation," Brown pointed out the ambiguity of this statement, which opened the way for a new interpretation of inerrancy by shifting from a literal interpretation of the text towards a focus on "the extent to which it conforms to the salvific purpose of God." Brown saw this as the Catholic Church "turning the corner" on inerrancy, saying, "the Roman Catholic Church does not change her official stance in a blunt way. Past statements are not rejected but are requoted with praise and then reinterpreted at the same time....What was really going on was an attempt gracefully to retain what was salvageable from the past and to move in a new direction at the same time."

=== New Testament Christology ===
In a detailed 1965 article in the journal Theological Studies examining whether Jesus was ever called "God" in the New Testament, Brown wrote, "Even the fourth Gospel never portrays Jesus as saying specifically that he is God" and "there is no reason to think that Jesus was called God in the earliest layers of New Testament tradition." He wrote that, "Gradually, in the development of Christian thought God was understood to be a broader term. It was seen that God had revealed so much of Himself in Jesus that God had to be able to include both Father and Son."

Thirty years later, Brown revisited the issue in an introductory text for the general public, writing, "three reasonably clear instances in the NT (Hebrews 1:8–9, John 1:1, 20:28) and in five instances that have probability, Jesus is called God," a usage Brown regarded as a natural development of early references to Jesus as "Lord".

=== Gospel of John ===
Brown analyzed the Gospel of John and divided it into two sections, which he labelled the Book of Signs and the Book of Glory. The Book of Signs recounts Jesus' public miracles, which are called signs. The Book of Glory features Jesus' private teachings to his disciples, his crucifixion, and his resurrection.

Brown identified three layers of text in John: 1) an initial version Brown considers based on personal experience of Jesus; 2) a structured literary creation by the evangelist which draws upon additional sources; and 3) the edited version that readers of the Bible know today.

== Academic reception ==
In 2005, Brown was described as "the premier Johannine scholar in the English-speaking world." However, while Brown's multiple-stage model of the Johannine community and the fourth gospel was influential for research during the late twentieth century, the consensus on the existence of the Johannine community would ultimately disappear with the advent of narrative criticism, influential critiques of the "gospel communities" hypothesis by scholars like Richard Bauckham, and the finding of flaws in J. Louis Martyn and Brown's theories. Skinner notes that Brown's hypothetical four-stage model was more speculative and arguably tendentious than Martyn's, something Brown himself seems to have acknowledged. Johannine scholarship has experienced a shift away from theories positing and reconstructing hypothetical sources behind John such as Brown's multistage communal theories, which had risen during a form-critical and historically positivist era of study.

== Reactions ==
=== Support ===
Terrence T. Prendergast stated that “for nearly 40 years Father Brown caught the entire church up into the excitement and new possibilities of scriptural scholarship." Much of Brown's work was given a nihil obstat and an imprimatur. The nihil obstat is a statement by an official reviewer, appointed by a bishop, that "nothing stands in the way" of a book being given an imprimatur; the imprimatur, which must normally be issued by a bishop of the diocese of publication, is the official endorsement "let it be printed" that a book contains nothing damaging to Catholic faith and morals. Brown was the expert appointed to review and provide the nihil obstat for The Jerome Biblical Commentary and The New Jerome Biblical Commentary, the standard basic reference book for Catholic Biblical studies, and he served as one of its editors and authors along with dozens of other Catholic scholars.

Joseph Ratzinger, later Pope Benedict XVI, complimented Brown saying that he "would be very happy if we had many exegetes like Father Brown". Later on however, Ratzinger would critique the overuse of historical criticism and parts of Brown's scholarship, saying that "we need a self-criticism of the historical method". In his obituary for The New York Times, Gustav Niebuhr wrote: "Father Brown was regarded as a centrist, with a reputation as a man of the church and a rigorous, exacting scholar whose work had to be reckoned with."

=== Criticism ===
Brown's scholarship was controversial for questioning the inerrancy of the whole of scripture and casting doubt on the historical accuracy of numerous articles of the Catholic faith. He was regarded as occupying the center ground in the field of biblical studies, opposing literalism found among many fundamentalist Christians but not carrying his conclusions as far as many other scholars. His critics included Cardinal Lawrence Shehan, Father Richard W. Gilsdorf, and George A. Kelly. Gilsdorf defined Brown's work as "a major contribution to the befogged wasteland of an 'American Church' progressively alienated from its divinely constituted center." George A. Kelly found fault with Brown's questioning of whether the Virgin birth of Jesus could be proven historically.

Other writers, critical of historical Christian claims about Jesus, criticized Brown for excessive caution, arguing that he was unwilling to acknowledge the radical implications of the critical methods he was using. Literary critic Frank Kermode, in his review of The Birth of the Messiah, accused Brown of being too eager to secure the imprimatur of the Catholic Church. The Hebraic Jesus scholar Géza Vermes, speaking of the Nativity narratives, has described Brown's coverage as "the primary example of the position of having your cake and eating it."

== Works ==
=== Thesis ===
- Brown, Raymond E. (1955). The Sensus Plenior of Sacred Scripture (Doctor of Sacred Theology dissertation). Baltimore: St. Mary's University. – Brown did much to define the term sensus plenior and had an enormous influence on the twentieth-century debate concerning the term.

=== Books ===
His total of 25 books on biblical subjects include:

- ——— (1965). New Testament Essays. Milwaukee: Bruce Pub. Co. OCLC 6530571.
- ——— (1966). The Gospel According to John: Chapters 1-12: translated, with introduction, notes, and commentary. Anchor Bible. Vol. 29. Garden City, NY: Doubleday. ISBN 978-0385015172. OCLC 350246.
- ——— (1970). The Gospel According to John: Chapters 13–21: translated, with introduction, notes, and commentary. Anchor Bible. Vol. 29A. Garden City, NY: Doubleday. ISBN 978-0385037617. OCLC 350246.
- ——— (1977). The Birth of the Messiah: a commentary on the infancy narratives in Matthew and Luke. Garden City, NY: Doubleday. ISBN 978-0385059077. OCLC 2967987.
- ——— (1979). The Community of the Beloved Disciple. New York: Paulist Press. ISBN 978-0809121748. OCLC 4944691.
- ——— (1981). The Critical Meaning of the Bible. New York: Paulist Press. ISBN 978-0809124060. OCLC 8020578.
- ——— (1982). The Epistles of John: translated, with introduction, notes, and commentary. Anchor Bible. Vol. 30. Garden City, NY: Doubleday. ISBN 978-0385056861. OCLC 7925227.
- ——— (1985). Biblical Exegesis and Church Doctrine. New York: Paulist Press. ISBN 978-0809103683. OCLC 13076569.
- ——— (1990). Responses to 101 Questions on the Bible. New York: Paulist Press. ISBN 978-0809104437. OCLC 21483229.
- ——— (1993). The Birth of the Messiah: a commentary on the infancy narratives in Matthew and Luke. Anchor Bible Reference Library (Revised ed.). Garden City, NY: Doubleday. ISBN 978-0385494472. OCLC 1000840333. – with a reappraisal of the infancy gospels.
- ——— (1994). The Death of the Messiah: from Gethsemane to the grave : a commentary on the Passion narratives in the four Gospels - in 2 Vols. Anchor Bible Reference Library. Garden City, NY: Doubleday. ISBN 978-0385193962. OCLC 27432279.
- ——— (1997). An Introduction to the New Testament. Anchor Bible Reference Library. Garden City, NY: Doubleday. ISBN 978-0385247672. OCLC 35990175.
- ——— (2003). An Introduction to the Gospel of John. New Haven, CT: Yale University Press. ISBN 978-0300140156.

=== Editor ===
- ———; Bea, Augustin Cardinal; Fitzmyer, Joseph A.; Murphy, Roland E., eds. (1968). Jerome Biblical Commentary – in 2 Vols. Englewood Cliffs, NJ: Prentice-Hall. ISBN 978-0135096123. OCLC 355447.
- ———; Donfried, Karl P.; Reumann, John Henry Paul, eds. (1973). Peter in the New Testament : a collaborative assessment by Protestant and Roman Catholic scholars. Minneapolis, MN: Augsburg Pub. House. ISBN 978-0806614014. OCLC 750095.
- ———; Achtemeier, Paul J., eds. (1978). Mary and the New Testament. Philadelphia, PA: Fortress Press. ISBN 978-0800613457. OCLC 4004724.
- ———; Bea, Augustin; Fitzmyer, Joseph A.; Murphy, Roland E., eds. (1990). New Jerome Biblical Commentary (Revision of Jerome Biblical Commentary ed.). Englewood Cliffs, NJ: Prentice-Hall. ISBN 978-0136149347. OCLC 19388491.

== See also ==
- John Shelby Spong#Criticism
- Catholic modernism
