= Alexa Suelzer =

American author and theologian (1918–2015)

Alexa Suelzer SP
- Born: June 19, 1918; Fort Wayne, Indiana, U.S.
- Died: June 26, 2015 (aged 97); Saint Mary-of-the-Woods, Indiana, U.S.
- Education: Saint Mary-of-the-Woods College, Marquette University, The Catholic University of America
- Known for: Old Testament criticism

Alexa Suelzer SP (June 19, 1918 – June 26, 2015) was an American religious sister of the congregation of the Sisters of Providence of Saint Mary-of-the-Woods, Indiana. Suelzer worked as an author, educator and theologian known for her Old Testament criticism. One of her most cited works is her essay "Modern Old Testament Criticism" in The New Jerome Biblical Commentary. In addition to her writing, she taught for twenty years at Saint Mary-of-the-Woods College.

== Early life ==
Suelzer was born on June 19, 1918, in Fort Wayne, Indiana. She entered consecrated life on February 14, 1938. Suelzer made her final vows on August 15, 1946. Two of her natural sisters had already become religious sisters as well.

== Career ==
Suelzer earned a bachelor's degree in English at Saint Mary-of-the-Woods College and then taught high school for fourteen years. By utilizing summer sessions, she completed a master's degree in English at Marquette University in 1956. That year she was selected to study at the Regina Mundi institute in Rome.

In 1958, Suelzer was sent to study for a doctorate in Sacred Doctrine at The Catholic University of America in Washington, D.C. This was at "a time during which ... few women were encouraged to pursue study in the specialized field of scripture." New approaches to scriptural religious studies were being developed in those years that were seen by many bishops as controversial. Suelzer's advisor Father Gerald Sloyan suggested she avoid unwanted criticism by giving her visionary dissertation a more traditional, pedagogical title, The Utilization of the Pentateuch in the Teaching of College Scripture, Suelzer completed her PhD in 1962; two years later her dissertation was published by Herder and Herder as The Pentateuch: A Study in Salvation History.

Suelzer's theological understanding became even more important to the Sisters of Providence after the church changes of the Second Vatican Council. She was active in the theological formation of new sisters. In 1964 she presented at the annual conference for the Conference of Major Superiors of Women (CMSW).

In later years, in addition to teaching theology at Saint Mary-of-the-Woods College for many years, Suelzer led retreats and spoken on the subject of prayer and scriptures. She was part of a committee to look into the case of Michigan Sister of Mercy Agnes Mary Mansour, who controversially refused to resign her position as the state's Director of Social Services though the State provided abortion services. Suelzer also participated in the Brookland Commission, an inquiry beginning in 1988 into the place of intellectual life among communities of women religious.

Suelzer continued to write and teach in her later years, teaching in the Masters of Pastoral Theology program at Saint Mary-of-the-Woods College well into her eighties and contributing to Sisters of Providence publications regularly into her nineties. She died at Saint Mary-of-the-Woods on June 26, 2015.

== Works ==
- The Utilization of the Theme of Salvation History in the Teaching of College Sacred Doctrine (1962)
- The Pentateuch: A Study in Salvation History (1964)
- "Modern Old Testament Criticism." In Brown, Raymond E., ed. The New Jerome Biblical Commentary (first publication 1968)
- "Ecclesial relationships for religious: desires and limits" (in Reviews for Religious, Jul/Aug 1984)
