= Richard W. Gilsdorf =

The Reverend Richard Gilsdorf
- Founder of Confraternity of Catholic Clergy
- Church: Roman Catholic Church
- Diocese: Roman Catholic Diocese of Green Bay

Orders
- Ordination: May 26, 1956 by Stanislaus Vincent Bona

Personal details
- Born: Richard W. Gilsdorf; January 24, 1930 Green Bay, Wisconsin, United States
- Died: May 4, 2005 (aged 75) Casco, Wisconsin, United States
- Denomination: Roman Catholic
- Occupation: Catholic Priest, Theologian
- Education: St. Norbert College, St. Meinrad Seminary, Columbia University, University of Paris, St. Louis University

Richard W. Gilsdorf (24 January 1930 – 4 May 2005) was a Catholic priest who played a role in doctrinal battles that followed the Second Vatican Council. He opposed renowned Scripture scholar Raymond E. Brown and wrote a number of articles for conservative Catholic publications on the issues of the day.

Gilsdorf critiqued what he saw as misuse and distortions of conciliar teachings and as he became disenchanted with leading theologians and academics such as Brown, Oscar Cullmann, and Karl Rahner.

== Biography ==
=== Early life and initial education ===
Gilsdorf was born in Green Bay, Wisconsin to Wilbert and Gladys Gilsdorf. He attended that city’s Central Catholic High School and then the St. Lawrence Minor Seminary in Mount Calvary, Wisconsin.

He received his BA at St. Norbert College in De Pere, Wisconsin, in 1952, and then studied Theology at St. Meinrad Seminary in St. Meinrad, Indiana, after which he received Holy Orders to the priesthood at the hands of Bishop Stanislaus Vincent Bona at Cathedral of Saint Francis Xavier in Green Bay, Wisconsin, on May 26, 1956.

=== Career ===
Gilsdorf served his first appointment at St. John Church in Little Chute, Wisconsin, for two years, and then received assignment to the faculty of Sacred Heart Minor Seminary near Green Bay. In September 1959, Gilsdorf presented a statement on behalf the Roman Catholic bishops of Wisconsin before the US Congressional Sub-committee on Migratory Labor regarding proposed legislation, and advocated for improved conditions for workers.

From 1960-61, Gilsdorf took a leave of absence to pursue advanced studies in classical languages at Columbia University in New York, where he received his master’s in Greek in 1961. He then attended the Sorbonne in Paris where he earned his Certificat du Cours Supérieur in 1963. In 1970, he received a second master's degree in Scripture from St. Louis University, and he completed his doctoral studies in Scripture in 1973.

He served at a number of parishes in the Diocese of Green Bay, was active in the diocese working with migrant workers, and taught summer courses in Scripture at the Pontifical Catechetical Institute in Beaverton, Oregon, for four straight years. During then-Bishop Adam Maida’s tenure as ordinary for the Green Bay diocese, Gilsdorf served as a member of the Presbyteral Council and the College of Consultors.

With Fr Robert Levis of Erie, Pennsylvania, and Fr Dudley Day, OSA, of Chicago, he founded and, from 1994–99, served as president of the Confraternity of Catholic Clergy, an organization of priests, deacons and seminarians.

Gilsdorf opposed renowned Scripture scholar Raymond E. Brown and wrote a number of articles for conservative Catholic publications on the issues of the day. Gilsdorf critiqued what he saw as misuse and distortions of conciliar teachings. According to Homiletic & Pastoral Review editor Kenneth Baker, described the impact of one article Gilsdorf wrote, The Plight of the Papist Priest:

“[The impact] was so great that it was translated into five languages, and people requested it for over 20 years. In it, he pinpointed the problem of priests trying to be faithful to the Pope and the Magisterium who are ordered by their bishop to do something less. Proof that he was on target is this: Priests from three different parts of the country told me they were sure the anonymous author was in their diocese.”

In his articles, Gilsdorf argued that the Catholic Church in America was "losing its moorings" and that many of the faithful had drifted into what he believed was "Modernist heresy," a phrase harkening back to debates from the early twentieth century.

For the final 23 years of his life he served as pastor of Holy Trinity Church in Casco, Wisconsin. After several years of serious illness, Gilsdorf died on May 4, 2005, and was buried at St. John the Baptist Cemetery in Howard, Wisconsin, near his father’s and mother’s tombs.

== Works ==
- The Lamb that is Slain, (1986)

During his priestly career, he wrote prolifically in publications such as Homiletic and Pastoral Review, The Wanderer, and Lay Witness. Two books were released posthumously,The Signs of the Times: Understanding the Church since Vatican II (2008) and Go to Joseph (2009).
