= Pheme Perkins =

American theologian

Pheme Perkins (born 1945 in Louisville, Kentucky) is a Professor of Theology at Boston College, where she has been teaching since 1972. In October 2017, she became the college's first Joseph Professor of Catholic Spirituality.

Perkins is studies the Greco-Roman cultural setting of early Christianity, as well as the Pauline Epistles and Gnosticism.

She was the president for the Catholic Biblical Association of America and was an associate editor of The New Oxford Annotated Bible, Third Edition.
