= Henning Graf Reventlow =

Henning Graf Reventlow, full name Henning Lothar Gert Count Reventlow (September 22, 1929 – September 9, 2010) was a German Protestant theologian, Old Testament scholar and university professor. He wrote numerous books on religion. His book The Authority of the Bible and the Rise of the Modern World was translated into English by John Bowden and won the Schlegel-Tieck Prize.

== Works in English ==
- History of Biblical Interpretation, Atlanta: Society of Biblical Literature, 2009–2010.
  - Vol. 1. From the Old Testament to Origen, translated by Leo G. Perdue
  - Vol. 2. From Late Antiquity to the End of the Middle Ages, translated by James O. Duke
  - Vol. 3. Renaissance, Reformation, Humanism, translated by James O. Duke
  - Vol. 4. From the Enlightenment to the Twentieth Century, translated by Leo G. Purdue.
