= Jerome Biblical Commentary =

1968 book

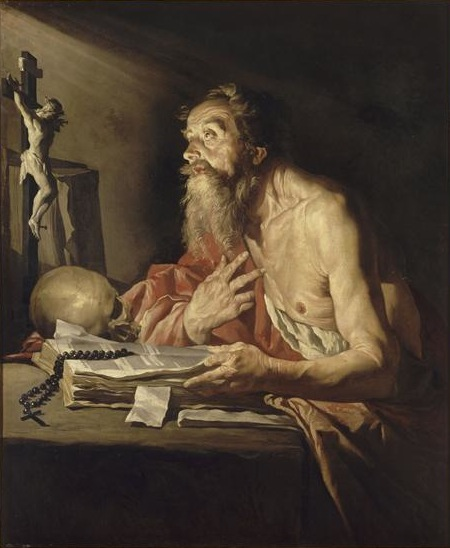
Jerome, Museum of Fine Arts, Nantes, France

The Jerome Biblical Commentary is a series of books of Biblical scholarship, whose first edition was published in 1968. It is arguably the most-used volume of Catholic scriptural commentary in the United States.

The book's title is a reference to Jerome, known for his translation of the Bible into Latin (the Vulgate) and his extensive Biblical commentaries.

== First edition ==
The Jerome Biblical Commentary was published in 1968 by Prentice Hall: it was edited by Raymond Edward Brown, Joseph A. Fitzmyer, and Roland E. Murphy. It immediately gained enormous fame, selling more than 200,000 copies; it was also translated into Spanish, Italian, and Portuguese.

== Second edition ==
The New Jerome Biblical Commentary was published in 1990 by the same editors as a revised and updated edition. In the foreword to the new edition, Cardinal Carlo Maria Martini acknowledges it as the work of "the best of English-speaking Catholic exegetes... [that] condenses the results of modern scientific criticism with rigor and clarity. Yet this contemporary approach is achieved without neglecting the long road that Christian tradition has travelled in dedicated, constant, and loving attention to the Word of God.... [The pages of the Bible] are duly situated in their appropriate historical and cultural context." Martini goes on to describe it as "an instrument for rich ecumenical dialogue" that avoids "arid literalism 'that kills'" and a drift "into generalized spiritual applications." It contains, besides detailed commentary on all the books of the Bible, introductory articles on parts of the Bible and on each book as well as topical articles:

- Apocrypha; Dead Sea Scrolls; Other Jewish Literature – Raymond E. Brown SS, Pheme Perkins, Anthony Saldarini
- Text and Versions – Raymond E. Brown SS, D. W. Johnson SJ, Kevin G. O'Connell SJ
- Modern Old Testament Criticism – Alexa Suelzer SP, John S. Kselman SS.
- Modern New Testament Criticism – John S. Kselman SS, Ronald D. Witherup SS
- Hermeneutics – Raymond E. Brown SS, Sandra M. Schneiders, I.H.M.
- Church Pronouncements – Raymond E. Brown SS, Thomas Aquinas Collins OP
- Biblical Geography – Raymond E. Brown SS, Robert North SJ
- Biblical Archaeology – Robert North SJ, Philip J. King
- A History of Israel – Addison G. Wright SS, Roland E. Murphy, O.Carm., Joseph A. Fitzmyer SJ
- Religious Institutions Of Israel – John J. Castelot, Aelred Cody OSB
- Aspects of Old Testament Thought – John L. McKenzie
- Jesus – John P. Meier
- Paul – Joseph A. Fitzmyer SJ
- Early Church – Raymond E. Brown SS, Carolyn Osiek RSCJ, Pheme Perkins
- Aspects of New Testament Thought – Raymond E. Brown SS, John R. Donahue SJ, Donald Senior CP, Adela Yarbro Collins
- Pauline Theology – Joseph A. Fitzmyer SS
- Johannine Theology – Francis J. Moloney SDB

== Third edition ==
The Jerome Biblical Commentary for the Twenty-First Century was published on 27 January 2022 by Bloomsbury Publishing: it is edited by John J. Collins, Gina Hens-Piazza, Barbara Reid OP and Donald Senior CP.

The new volume continues its approach of historical-critical methodology in the light of Catholic tradition, with a broader array of commentators beyond Europe and North America; Pope Francis wrote a foreword for the volume.

== Editions ==
- Brown, Raymond Edward; Fitzmyer, Joseph A.; Murphy, Roland E., eds. (1968). The Jerome Biblical Commentary (2 volumes). Englewood Cliffs, N.J.: Prentice-Hall. ASIN B000ZGL0PI. LCCN 68009140. OCLC 355447.
- Brown, Raymond Edward; Fitzmyer, Joseph A.; Murphy, Roland E, eds. (1990). The New Jerome Biblical Commentary. Englewood Cliffs, N.J.: Prentice-Hall. ISBN 978-0136149347.
- Brown, Raymond Edward; Fitzmyer, Joseph A.; Murphy, Roland E, eds. (2007). Novo Comentário Bíblico São Jerônimo. São Paulo: Paulus. ISBN 9788598481197.
- Collins, John J.; Hens-Piazza, Gina; Reid, Barbara, eds. (2022). The Jerome Biblical Commentary for the Twenty-First Century - Third Fully Revised Edition. New York, N.Y.: Bloomsbury Publishing. ISBN 978-1474248853.
