= Oxford Annotated Bible =

Study Bible published by the Oxford University Press

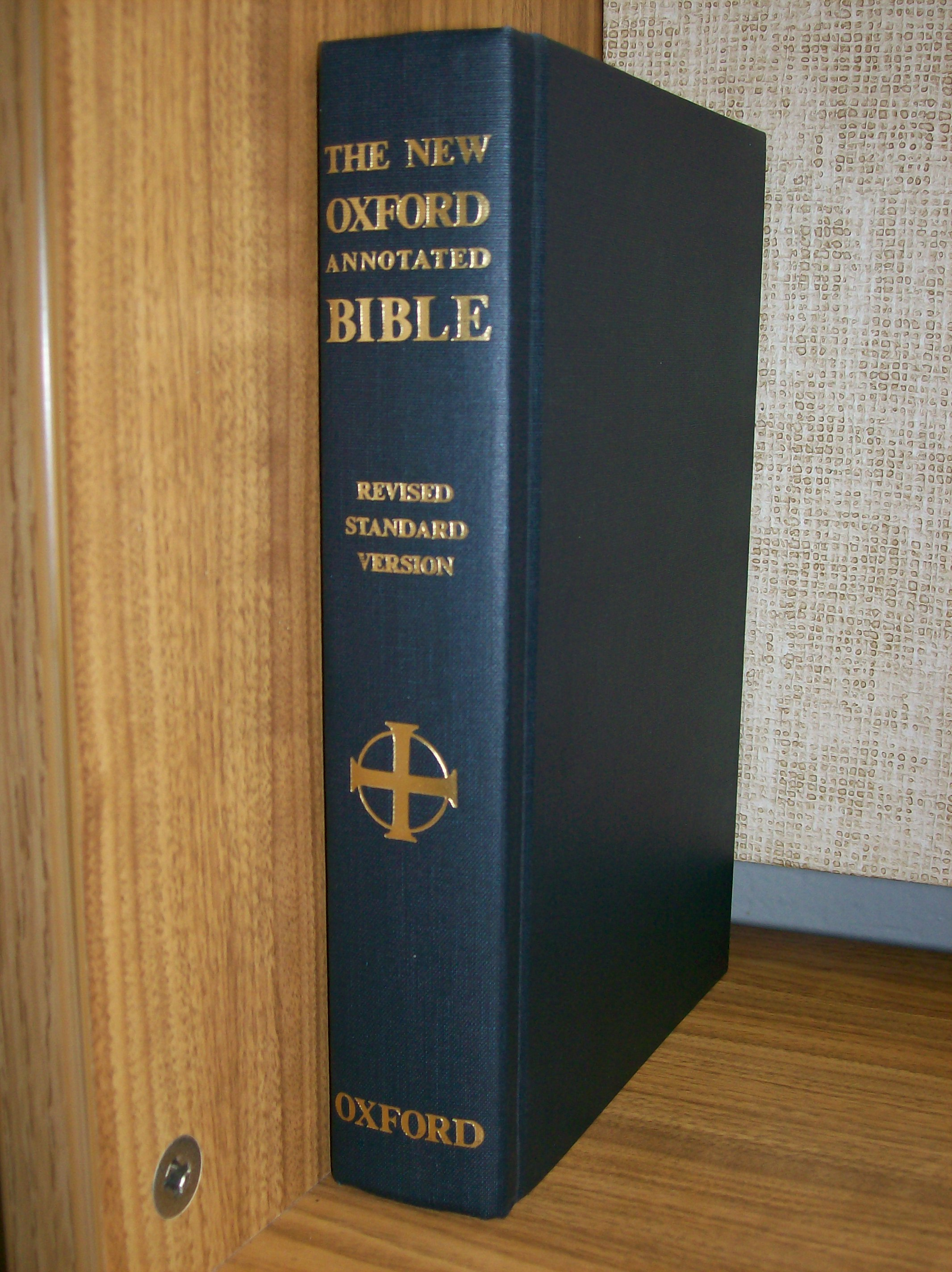
The 1973 edition of The New Oxford Annotated Bible, with the RSV text

The Oxford Annotated Bible (OAB), later published as the New Oxford Annotated Bible (NOAB), is a study Bible published by the Oxford University Press. The notes and study material feature in-depth academic research with a focus on the most recent advances in historical criticism with contributions from Jewish, Catholic, Protestant, and non-religious scholars.

== Editions and Biblical versions ==
In 1962, the first edition of the OAB, edited by Rev. Dr. Herbert G. May and Dr. Bruce M. Metzger was published which used the Revised Standard Version (RSV) of the Bible.

In 1965, the OAB was re-published with the Apocrypha because some of the Apocrypha is used by the Catholic and Orthodox Churches. That same year, the OAB received an official imprimatur of Cardinal Richard Cushing for use by Catholics as a Study Bible. Later, the OAB was welcomed by Orthodox leaders as well.

In 1973, the second edition of the OAB now called the New Oxford Annotated Bible (NOAB) was published which also used the RSV text, including the Second Edition of the RSV New Testament (1971).

In 1977, the NOAB was re-published with the Apocrypha. This edition is still in print.

In 1991 a new edition of the NOAB was published which used the New Revised Standard Version (NRSV) of the Bible. Co-edited by Bruce M. Metzger (New Testament) and Roland E. Murphy (Old Testament), it was available in editions both with and without the Apocrypha/Deuterocanonical Books.

In 2001, a third edition was published, also using the New Revised Standard Version (NRSV) of the Bible. Edited by Michael D. Coogan, it is considered to be yet more ecumenical and interfaith in approach, taking account of the diversity of its users especially in academic contexts, with new essays on the formation of the biblical canon for Jews and various Christian churches. And, for example, it calls the Old Testament the "Hebrew Bible" out of consideration for Jewish readers.

In 2010, a fourth edition was published which contained new color maps along with updated essays and commentaries.

In 2018, a fifth edition was published with similar improvements.

In 2026, a sixth edition was published, with revised annotations and using the NRSV Updated Edition (NRSVue) of the Bible.
