= Roland E. Murphy =

American biblical scholar (1917–2002)

- Born: 19 July 1917; Chicago, Illinois, U.S.
- Died: 20 July 2002 (aged 85); Washington, D.C.

Academic background
- Education: The Catholic University of America

Academic work
- Discipline: Theology; Old Testament
- Institutions: The Catholic University of America; Duke University

Roland Edmund Murphy (July 19, 1917 – July 20, 2002) was an American Catholic priest of the Carmelite order, a biblical scholar and a specialist in the study of the Old Testament. He was the George Washington Ivey Professor of Biblical Studies at Duke University.

== Life ==
Murphy was ordained a priest in the Carmelite order on 23 May 1942 in Chicago. He received M.A. Degrees in Philosophy and in Semitic languages, and an S.T.D. in Scripture, all from the Catholic University of America. Murphy also held a graduate degree from the Pontifical Biblical Institute in Rome. A "noted Scripture scholar", he taught at the Catholic University of America for over twenty-five years; he then took an appointment at Duke University's Divinity School, the "first Catholic faculty member at Methodist Duke Divinity School", where he remained until his death. He was a collaborator on the New American Bible (NAB), a Catholic Bible translation first published in 1970, and a co-editor of both the Jerome Biblical Commentary and the (New) Jerome Biblical Commentary. Murphy also served as president of the Catholic Biblical Association of America (1968-1969) and of the Society of Biblical Literature (1984).

== Select publications ==
Books

- Wisdom Literature: Job, Proverbs, Ruth, Canticles, Ecclesiastes, and Esther (1981), ISBN 9780802818775
- The Tree of Life: An Exploration of Biblical Wisdom Literature (1990), ISBN 9780802839657
- The Gift of Psalms (2000), ISBN 9781565634749
- The Dead Sea Scrolls and the Bible (1956) The Newman Press, Library of Congress Catalog Card Number: 56-11425
- Word Biblical Commentary 23a: Ecclesiastes (1992) Zondervan, ISBN 9780310522287

Edited volumes

- The New Jerome Biblical Commentary (Brown/Fitzmyer/Murphy)
- The New Oxford Annotated Bible, New Revised Standard Version (Metzger/Murphy)
- The New Oxford Annotated Bible with the Apocrypha (Metzger/Murphy)
- The Song of Songs: A Commentary on the Book of Canticles or the Song of Songs (Hermeneia: a Critical and Historical Commentary on the Bible) (McBride/Murphy, 1990) ISBN 9780334006527

== See also ==
- New American Bible
