= Joseph Fitzmyer =

American biblical scholar (1920-2016)

The Reverend Joseph Fitzmyer SJ
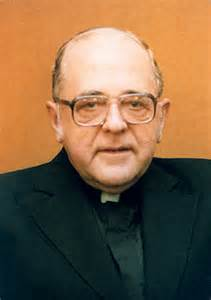

Orders
- Ordination: August 15, 1951

Personal details
- Born: Joseph Augustine Fitzmyer; November 4, 1920 Philadelphia, Pennsylvania, US
- Died: December 24, 2016 (aged 96) Merion Station, Pennsylvania, US
- Denomination: Catholic
- Occupation: Jesuit priest, Biblical scholar and theologian
- Education: Loyola University Chicago; Catholic University of Leuven; Johns Hopkins University; Pontifical Biblical Institute

Joseph Augustine Fitzmyer SJ (November 4, 1920 – December 24, 2016) was an American Catholic priest and scholar who taught at several American and British universities. He was a member of the Society of Jesus (Jesuits).

Fitzmyer was considered an important scholar of biblical studies, particularly the New Testament. He also contributed to the study of the Dead Sea Scrolls and early Jewish literature.

== Biography ==
=== Early life ===
Joseph Fitzmyer was born on November 4, 1920, in Philadelphia, Pennsylvania. He was admitted on July 30, 1938 to the novitiate of the Maryland Province of the Society of Jesus in Wernersville, Pennsylvania. In 1940, he entered Loyola University Chicago, earning a Bachelor of Arts degree and in 1945 a Master of Arts degree in Greek language. Fitzmyer then studied theology in the Facultés Saint-Albert in Belgium.

=== Priesthood ===
Fitzmyer was ordained into the priesthood on August 15, 1951. He was granted a Licentiate of Sacred Theology by the Catholic University of Leuven in Leuven, Belgium, in 1952 and a Doctor of Semitics degree from Johns Hopkins University in Baltimore, Maryland in 1956. He completed his education with a Licentiate of Sacred Scripture from the Pontifical Biblical Institute in Rome in 1957. He then received a fellowship at the American School of Oriental Research (ASOR) in Jerusalem. He worked on preparing a concordance to the Dead Sea Scrolls.

=== Career ===
From 1958 to 1969, Fitzmyer taught New Testament and biblical languages at Woodstock College in Woodstock, Maryland. He moved to Chicago in 1969 to teach Aramaic and Hebrew at the University of Chicago. In 1971, Fitzmyer joined the faculty of Fordham University to teach New Testament and biblical languages. He then went to the Weston School of Theology at Boston College in Boston, Massachusetts.

Fitzmyer served as the speaker's lecturer at the University of Oxford in the United Kingdom from 1974 to 1975. In 1976, Fitzmyer was appointed as a professor of New Testament in the Department of Biblical Studies at the Catholic University of America in Washington, D.C. Fitzmyer joined the Jesuit community at Georgetown University in Washington.

Fitzmyer served as editor of the Catholic Biblical Quarterly, The Journal of Biblical Literature and New Testament Studies. He was president of the Catholic Biblical Association of America (1969–1970), of the Society of Biblical Literature (1979), and of the Studiorum Novi Testamenti Societas (1992–1993). He was the 1984 recipient of the Burkitt Medal of the British Academy and was a member of the Pontifical Biblical Commission from 1984 to 1995.

=== Retirement, death and legacy ===
In 1986, Fitzmyer retired from Catholic University, but did not go into full retirement until 2011. Joseph Fitzmyer died in Merion, Pennsylvania, on December 24, 2016.

John Martens told the magazine America that Fitzmyer was:

a giant of biblical scholarship. No qualifiers need apply. He was not a giant of Catholic biblical scholarship, not a giant of 20th-century biblical scholarship, just a giant of biblical scholarship.

Fitzmyer's funeral was held on 5 January 2017 at St. Matthias Church in Bala Cynwyd, Pennsylvania and he was buried in the cemetery of the Jesuit Center in Wernersville, Pennsylvania.

== Biblical commentaries ==
Fitzmyer's publications covered Scripture, theology, Christology, catechesis, and the Dead Sea Scrolls. He was a co-editor of the Jerome Biblical Commentary (1968) and the New Jerome Biblical Commentary (1991)

The New Jerome Biblical Commentary (1989) This includes articles introducing the New Testament Epistles, Epistle to the Galatians, Romans, Philemon and on the history of Israel as well as Paul the Apostle and Pauline theology. In the last one, after a historical review of 40 themes, Fitzmyer concludes:

As Christ was "the image of the God" (2 Cor 4:4) so human beings are destined to be "the image of the heavenly man" (1 Cor 15:49; cf. Rom 8:29). [Through] growth in Christ ... the Christian lives his or her life "for God" (Gal 2:19). Thus, for all his emphasis on Christ, Paul once again refers Christian existence ultimately to the Father – through Christ.

Anchor Bible Commentary (1993). It contains the Spiritual Exercises Based on Paul's Epistle to the Romans, which links biblical commentary and exegeses with modern spirituality. In it, Fitzmyer lays out his interpretation of Romans in a more condensed form. Using historical and rhetorical criticism, Paul's Jewish background and Graeco-Roman setting, Fitzmyer sees coherency in Paul's message. While some scholars argue that Paul's theology is largely dependent on its context, such as the crisis in the Corinthian community, Fitzmyer argues for a vital application of Romans to modern situations. It also includes work on The Gospel of Luke (in two volumes), Acts of the Apostles, 1 Corinthians, Romans, and Philemon.

The Impact of the Dead Sea Scrolls. Fitzmyer summarizes his 50 years of research in the field.

== Selected works ==
=== Books ===
- Fitzmyer, Joseph (1964). The Historical Truth of the Gospels: the 1964 instruction of the Biblical Commission. Glen Rock, NJ: Paulist Press. ISBN 978-0-8091-3253-9. See "The Biblical Commission's Instruction" below for earliest publication in English.
- ——— (1967). The Aramaic Inscriptions of Sefîre (2nd ed.). Rome: Pontificial Biblical Institute. ISBN 978-8-8765-3347-1.
- ——— (1979). The Semitic Background of the New Testament Volume II: A Wandering Aramean: Collected Aramaic Essays. Biblical Resource Series (3rd ed.). Grand Rapids, MI: Eerdmans. ISBN 978-0-8028-4846-8.
- ——— (1981). The Gospel According to Luke 1–9. Anchor Yale Bible. Vol. 28. New York: Doubleday. ISBN 978-0-3850-0515-9.
- Reumann, John Henry Paul; ——— (1982). Righteousness in the New Testament: Justification in the United States Lutheran-Roman Catholic Dialogue. Philadelphia, PA & New York: Fortress Press & Paulist Press. ISBN 978-0-8091-2436-7.
- ——— (1985). The Gospel according to Luke 10–24. Anchor Yale Bible. Vol. 28A. New York: Doubleday. ISBN 978-0-3851-5542-7.
- ——— (1986). Scripture and Christology: a statement of the Biblical Commission with a commentary. New York: Paulist Press. ISBN 978-0-8091-2789-4.
- ——— (1989). Paul and His Theology: A Brief Sketch (2nd ed.). Englewood Cliffs, NJ: Prentice Hall. ISBN 978-0-1365-4419-7.
- ——— (1990). Brown, Raymond E.; et al. (eds.). The New Jerome Biblical commentary. Englewood Cliffs, NJ: Prentice Hall. ISBN 978-0-2256-6803-2.
- ———; Glanzman, George S. (1990). An Introductory Bibliography for the Study of Scripture (3rd ed.). Rome: Pontificio Istituto Biblico. ISBN 978-8-8765-3592-5.
- ——— (1990). The Dead Sea Scrolls: major publications and tools for study (Revised ed.). Atlanta, GA: Scholars Press. ISBN 978-0-8841-4053-5.
- ——— (1991). A Christological Catechism: New Testament Answers (Second ed.). Glen Rock, NJ: Paulist Press. ISBN 978-0-8091-3253-9.
- ——— (1992). Responses to 101 Questions on the Dead Sea Scrolls. Glen Rock, NJ: Paulist Press. ISBN 978-0-8091-3348-2.
- ———; Kaufman, Stephen A. (1992). An Aramaic Bibliography: Part I: Old, Official, and Biblical Aramaic (Publications of The Comprehensive Aramaic Lexicon Project). Baltimore, MD: Johns Hopkins University Press. ISBN 978-0-8018-4312-9.
- ——— (1993). According to Paul: Studies in the Theology of the Apostle. Glen Rock, NJ: Paulist Press. ISBN 978-0-8091-3390-1.
- ——— (1993). Romans. Anchor Yale Bible. Vol. 33. New York: Doubleday. ISBN 978-0-3001-4078-1.
- ——— (1994). Scripture: The Soul of Theology. Glen Rock, NJ: Paulist Press. ISBN 978-0-8091-3509-7.
- ———; Harrington, Daniel J. (1994). A Manual of Palestinian Aramaic texts: (second century B.C.–second century A.D.) (2nd ed.). Rome: Editrice Pontificio Istituto Biblico. ISBN 978-8876533341.
- ——— (1995). The Biblical Commission's Document "The Interpretation of the Bible in the Church: Text and Commentary. Subsidia biblica. Vol. 18. Rome: Editrice Pontificio Istituto Biblico. ISBN 978-8-8765-3605-2.
- ——— (1995). Spiritual Exercises Based on Paul's Epistle to the Romans. Glen Rock, NJ: Paulist Press. ISBN 978-0-8091-3580-6.
- ——— (1997). The Semitic Background of the New Testament Volume I: Essays on the Semitic Background of the New Testament. Biblical Resource Series (Reprint ed.). Grand Rapids, MI: Eerdmans. ISBN 978-0-8028-4845-1.
- ——— (1997). The Semitic Background of the New Testament: Combined Edition of "Essays on the Semitic Background of the New Testament" and "A Wandering Aramean". Biblical Resource Series (Combined ed.). Grand Rapids, MI: Eerdmans. ISBN 978-0-8028-4344-9.
- ——— (1998). The Acts of the Apostles. Anchor Yale Bible. Vol. 31. New York: Doubleday. ISBN 978-0-3854-6880-0.
- ——— (1998). To Advance the Gospel: New Testament Studies. Biblical Resource Series (2nd ed.). New York: Paulist Press. ISBN 978-0802844255.
- ——— (2000). The Dead Sea Scrolls and Christian Origins. Studies in the Dead Sea Scrolls & Related Literature. Grand Rapids, MI: Eerdmans. ISBN 978-0-8028-4650-1.
- ——— (2001). The Letter to Philemon. Anchor Yale Bible. Vol. 34C. New York: Doubleday. ISBN 978-0-3001-4055-2.
- ——— (2002). Tobit. Berlin: Walter de Gruyter. ISBN 978-3-1101-7574-5.
- ——— (2004). The Genesis Apocryphon of Qumran Cave 1 (1Q20): a commentary (3rd ed.). Rome: Editrice Pontificio Istituto Biblico. ISBN 978-8-8765-3318-1.
- ——— (2007). The One Who is to Come. Grand Rapids, MI: Eerdmans. ISBN 978-0-8028-4013-4.
- ——— (2008). 1 Corinthians. Anchor Yale Bible. Vol. 33. New York: Yale University Press. ISBN 978-0-3001-4044-6.
- ——— (2008). Luke the Theologian: Aspects of His Teaching. Eugene, OR: Wipf & Stock. ISBN 978-1-5924-4959-0.
- ——— (2008). The Interpretation of Scripture: In Defense of the Historical-Critical Method. New York: Paulist Press. ISBN 978-0-8091-4504-1.
- ——— (2008). A Guide to the Dead Sea Scrolls and Related Literature. Studies in the Dead Sea Scrolls & Related Literature (Revised & expanded ed.). Grand Rapids, MI: Eerdmans. ISBN 978-0-8028-6241-9.
- ——— (2009). The Impact of the Dead Sea Scrolls. New York: Paulist Press. ISBN 978-0-8091-4615-4.

=== Articles and chapters ===
- ——— (1964). "The Biblical Commission's Instruction on the historical truth of the Gospels". Theological Studies. 25 (3): 386–408. doi:10.1177/004056396402500302. S2CID 170679530.

=== Festschrift ===
- M. P. Horgan and P. J. Kobelski, To Touch the Text: Biblical and Related Studies in Honor of Joseph A. Fitzmyer, S.J. New York: Crossroad, 1989.
