= Catherine Moran =

New Zealand academic

Academic background
- Education: University of Canterbury
- Thesis: Language comprehension and working memory in adolescents with traumatic brain injury (2002)
- Doctoral advisor: Gail Gillon, Jennifer Shirley Horner, John Dalrymple-Alford, Ken M. Bleile

Catherine Ann Moran is a Canadian–New Zealand academic, and is a full professor at the University of Canterbury, specialising in memory and cognition, and language learning. She is especially interested in how head injuries affected the development and processing of language.

== Academic career ==
Moran completed both Bachelor and Master of Science degrees at the University of Western Ontario. She then moved to New Zealand where she completed a PhD titled Language comprehension and working memory in adolescents with traumatic brain injury at the University of Canterbury in 2002. Moran then joined the faculty of the University of Canterbury, rising to full professor. Moran is the Deputy Vice-Chancellor Academic for the university.

Moran's research focuses on cognition, memory, and the processing and production of language. Although she studies language abilities and development in both impaired and healthy adolescents and children, she is particularly interested in how head injuries affect language ability. She has also written about how artificial intelligence can assist in education, and in 2020 spoke about the University of Canterbury's use of AI to monitor student behaviour on the university's "Learn" online platform, to identify students whose reduced engagement compared to their classmates might indicate they are at risk of dropping out.

From 1997 to 2002 Moran chaired the Registration Panel for the New Zealand Speech-Language Therapy Association, and was on the leadership team of the New Zealand Institute of Language, Brain, and Behaviour. She served five years as chair of the University of Canterbury Human Ethics Committee.

== Selected works ==
- Moran, Catherine Ann; Gillon, Gail Therese (2005). "Inference comprehension of adolescents with traumatic brain injury: a working memory hypothesis". Brain Injury. 19 (10): 743–751. doi:10.1080/02699050500110199. PMID 16175835. Wikidata Q51988668.
- Freya Gumbley; Huckabee, Maggie Lee; Sebastian H Doeltgen; Ulrike Witte; Moran, Catherine Ann (2008). "Effects of bolus volume on pharyngeal contact pressure during normal swallowing". Dysphagia. 23 (3): 280–285. doi:10.1007/s00455-007-9137-9. PMID 18253791. Wikidata Q80643107.
- Moran, Catherine Ann; Gillon, Gail Therese (2004). "Language and memory profiles of adolescents with traumatic brain injury". Brain Injury. 18 (3): 273–288. doi:10.1080/02699050310001617415. PMID 14726286. Wikidata Q47262803.
- McAuliffe, Megan J.; Sonja Carpenter; Moran, Catherine Ann (2010). "Speech intelligibility and perceptions of communication effectiveness by speakers with dysarthria following traumatic brain injury and their communication partners". Brain Injury. 24 (12): 1408–1415. doi:10.3109/02699052.2010.511590. PMID 20858025. Wikidata Q53074078.
- Emma Hay; Moran, Catherine Ann (2005). "Discourse formulation in children with closed head injury". American Journal of Speech-Language Pathology. 14 (4): 324–336. doi:10.1044/1058-0360(2005/031). PMID 16396615. Wikidata Q40359947.
- Moran, Catherine Ann; Cecilia Kirk; Emma Powell (2012). "Spoken persuasive discourse abilities of adolescents with acquired brain injury". Language Speech and Hearing Services in Schools. 43 (3): 264–275. doi:10.1044/0161-1461(2011/10-0114). PMID 22269583. Wikidata Q48695982.
- Moran, Catherine Ann; Marilyn A Nippold; Gillon, Gail Therese (2006). "Working memory and proverb comprehension in adolescents with traumatic brain injury: a preliminary investigation". Brain Injury. 20 (4): 417–423. doi:10.1080/02699050500488223. PMID 16716987. Wikidata Q40323225.
