= IJSLP =

IJSLP may refer to:

- International Journal of Slavic Linguistics and Poetics (1959–2006)
- International Journal of Speech-Language Pathology (1999–)
