= Rosemarie Scolaro Moser =

American neuropsychologist

Rosemarie Scolaro Moser is an American sports neuropsychologist and director of the Sports Concussion Center of New Jersey. She is the first female to receive the Distinguished Career Award from the Sports Neuropsychology Society (SNS) and the first elected female president of SNS.

Her frequently cited research paper titled, The Prolonged Effects of Sports-related Concussion in High School Athletes, published in Neurosurgery (2005) introduced the public health issue of concussion in youth.

== Career ==
Moser is known for clinical practice and research in youth sports concussion. She and her research team published the first evidenced-based research demonstrating the utility of rest in concussion recovery, including Efficacy of Immediate and Delayed Cognitive and Physical Rest Following Sports-Related Concussion in the Journal of Pediatrics (2012) and Examining Prescribed Rest as Treatment for Adolescents Who are Slow to Recover from Concussion published in Brain Injury (2014). Her areas of concussion research include cultural differences in concussion knowledge and the criteria used for concussion clinical decision making.

Moser has served as a scientific expert/co-author for the U.S. Centers for Disease Control and Prevention's Pediatric Mild Traumatic Brain Injury Work Group and for the systematic reviews of the International Consensus Conferences on Concussion in Sport (Berlin & Amsterdam).

She was the concussion doctor for the Philadelphia Soul professional arena football team and is one of the team of experts for MomsTEAM.

== Other achievements and awards ==
Moser served as president of the New Jersey Psychological Association (2003) and of the New Jersey Neuropsychological Society (1999), and treasurer of the National Academy of Neuropsychology (2005–2007). Additional awards include the 2020 Lifetime Achievement Award for Clinical Excellence from the National Register of Health Service Psychologists, a national organization of 10,000 psychologists, and the 2003 American Psychological Association's Karl F. Heiser Presidential Award for Psychology Advocacy.

She is a fellow of the American Psychological Association, National Academy of Neuropsychology, and Sports Neuropsychology Society.

== Books ==
- Moser, Rosemarie Scolaro; Frantz, Corrine E. (2000). Shocking Violence: Youth Perpetrators and Victims. Charles C. Thomas Publishers. ISBN 978-0-398-07121-9.
- Moser, Rosemarie Scolaro; Frantz, Corrine E. (2003). Shocking Violence II: Disaster, War, and Terrorism Affecting Our Youth. Charles C. Thomas Publishers. ISBN 978-0-398-08439-4.
- Moser, Rosemarie Scolaro (2012). Ahead of the Game: The Parents' Guide to Youth Sports Concussion. Dartmouth College Press. ISBN 978-1-61168-224-3.
