= Metalinguistics =

Study of relationship between language and culture

Metalinguistics is the branch of linguistics that studies language and its relationship to other cultural behaviors. It is the study of how different parts of speech and communication interact with each other and reflect the way people live and communicate together. Jacob L. Mey in his book, Trends in Linguistics, describes Mikhail Bakhtin's interpretation of metalinguistics as "encompassing the life history of a speech community, with an orientation toward a study of large events in the speech life of people and embody changes in various cultures and ages."

== Literacy development ==
Metalinguistic skills involve understanding of the rules used to govern language. Scholar Patrick Hartwell points out how substantial it is for students to develop these capabilities, especially heightened phonological awareness, which is a key precursor to literacy. An essential aspect to language development is focused on the student being aware of language and the components of language.

This idea is also examined in the article, 'Metalinguistic Awareness and Literacy Acquisition in Different Languages', that centers on how the construction of a language and writing strategy shape an individual's ability to read. It also discusses the manner in which bilingualism increases particular elements of metalinguistic awareness.

Published research studies by Elizabeth McAllister have concluded that metalinguistic abilities are associated to cognitive development and is contingent on metalinguistic awareness which relates to reading skill level, academic success and cultural environment that starts at infancy and continues through preschool.

According to Text in Education and Society, some examples of metalinguistic skills include discussing, examining, thinking about language, grammar and reading comprehension. The text also states that a student's recognition or self-correction of language in verbal and written form helps them further advance their skills. The book also illustrates manners in which literature can form connections or create boundaries between educational intelligence and practical knowledge.

Gail Gillon wrote the book, Phonological Awareness, which illustrates the connection between phonological awareness and metalinguistic awareness in literacy learning. It essentially states that a student's ability to understand the spoken word and their ability to recognize a word and decode it are dependent on each other. The text also discusses ways in which students struggling with speech impairments and reading difficulties can improve their learning process.

== In linguistics ==
Linguists use this term to designate activities associated with metalanguage, a language composed of the entirety of words forming linguistic terminology (for example, syntax, semantics, phoneme, lexeme... as well as terms in more current usage, such as word, sentence, letter, etc.) Metalinguistics is used to refer to the language, whether natural or formalized (as in logic), which is itself used to speak of language; to a language whose sole function is to describe a language. The language itself must constitute the sole sphere of application for the entire vocabulary.

Experts are undecided about the value of awareness of metalanguage to language learners, and some "schools of thought" in language learning have been heavily against it.

== Metalinguistic awareness and bilingualism ==
Metalinguistic awareness refers to the understanding that language is a system of communication, bound to rules, and forms the basis for the ability to discuss different ways to use language (Baten, Hofman, & Loeys, 2011). In other words, it is the ability to consciously analyze language and its sub-parts, to know how they operate and how they are incorporated into the wider language system (Beceren, 2010). An individual with such ability is aware that linguistic forms and structure can interact and be manipulated to produce a vast variety of meanings. Words are only arbitrarily and symbolically associated with their referents, and are separable from them. For example, a dog is named "Cat", but the word "Cat" is only a representation for the animal, dog. It does not make the dog a cat.

The term was first used by Harvard professor Courtney Cazden in 1974 to demonstrate the shift of linguistic intelligence across languages. Metalinguistic awareness in bilingual learners is the ability to objectively function outside one language system and to objectify languages’ rules, structures and functions. Code-switching and translation are examples of bilinguals’ metalinguistic awareness. Metalinguistics awareness was used as a construct in research extensively in the mid 1980s and early 1990s.

Metalinguistic awareness is a theme that has frequently appeared in the study of bilingualism. It can be divided into four subcategories, namely phonological, word, syntactic and pragmatic awareness (Tunmer, Herriman, & Nesdale, 1988). Amongst the four, phonological and word awareness are the two aspects of metalinguistic awareness that have garnered the greatest attention in bilingual literacy research. Research has shown metalinguistic awareness in bilinguals to be a crucial component because of its documented relationship and positive effects on language ability, symbolic development and literacy skills. Indeed, many studies investigating the impact of bilingualism on phonological and word awareness have indicated a positive bilingual effect (Baten, et al., 2011; Chen et al., 2004; Goetz, 2003; Kang, 2010; Ransdell, Barbier, & Niit, 2006; Whitehurst & Lonigan, 1998). Bilinguals are simultaneously learning and switching between two languages, which may facilitate the development of stronger phonological awareness. It is postulated that bilinguals’ experiences of acquiring and maintaining two different languages aid them in developing an explicit and articulated understanding of how language works (Adesope, Lavin, Thompson, & Ungerleider, 2010). Hence they are equipped with stronger metalinguistic awareness as compared to their monolingual counterparts.

In their book Literacy and Orality, scholars David R. Olson and Nancy Torrance explore the relationship between literacy and metalinguistic awareness, citing a link that arises from the fact that, in both reading and writing, language can become the object of thought and discussion. Prose reading and writing can be an instrument of metalinguistic reflection and in those cases one must assess the particular meaning of terms and of grammatical relations between them in order, either to understand such texts or write them.

The self-referential capacity of language and metalinguistics has also been explored as problematic for interpreters and translators, who necessarily work between languages. The issue has been studied to determine how signed language interpreters render self-referential instances across languages. Because spoken and signed languages share no phonological parameters, interpreters working between two modalities use a variety of tactics to render such references, including fingerspelling, description, modeling signs, using words, pointing to objects, pointing to signs, using metalanguage, and using multiple strategies simultaneously or serially. Deaf-hearing interpreting teams, in which an interpreter who can hear and an interpreter who is deaf work together in a relay fashion, also employ a variety of strategies to render such metalinguistic references.

== See also ==
- Metacognition
- Metalinguistic awareness

== Other sources ==
- Baten, K., Hofman, F., & Loeys, T. (2011). Cross-linguistic activation in bilingual sentence processing: The role of word class meaning. Bilingualism: language and cognition, 14(3), 351-359. doi:10.1017/S1366728910000246
- Beceren, S. (2010). Comparison of metalinguistic development in sequential bilinguals and monolinguals. The International Journal of Educational Researchers 2010, 1(1), 28-40.
- Tunmer, W. E., Herriman, M. L., & Nesdale, A. R. (1988). Metalinguistic abilities and beginning reading. Reading Research Quarterly, 23(2), 134-158.
- Chen, X., Anderson, R. C., Li, W., Hao, M., Wu, X., & Shu, H. (2004). Phonological awareness of bilingual and monolingual Chinese children. Journal of Educational Psychology, 96(1), 142-151.
- Kang, J. (2010). Do bilingual children possess better phonological awareness? Investigation of Korean monolingual and Korean-English bilingual children. Reading and Writing, 1-21. doi:10.1007/s11145-010-9277-4
- Ransdell, S., Barbier, M.-L., & Niit, T. (2006). Metacognitions about language skill and working memory among monolingual and bilingual college students: When does multilingualism matter? International Journal of Bilingual Education and Bilingualism, 9(6), 728-741.
- Whitehurst, G. J., & Lonigan, C. J. (1998). Child development and emergent literacy. Child Development, 69(3), 848-872.
- Adesope, O. O., Lavin, T., Thompson, T., & Ungerleider, C. (2010). A systematic review and meta-analysis of the cognitive correlates of bilingualism. Review of Educational Research, 80(2), 207-245. doi:10.3102/0034654310368803
- Goetz, P. J. (2003). The effects of bilingualism on the theory of mind development. Bilingualism: Language and Cognition, 6(1), 1-15. doi:10.1017/S1366728903001007
