= Pamela Snow =

Clinical linguistics and speech pathology researcher

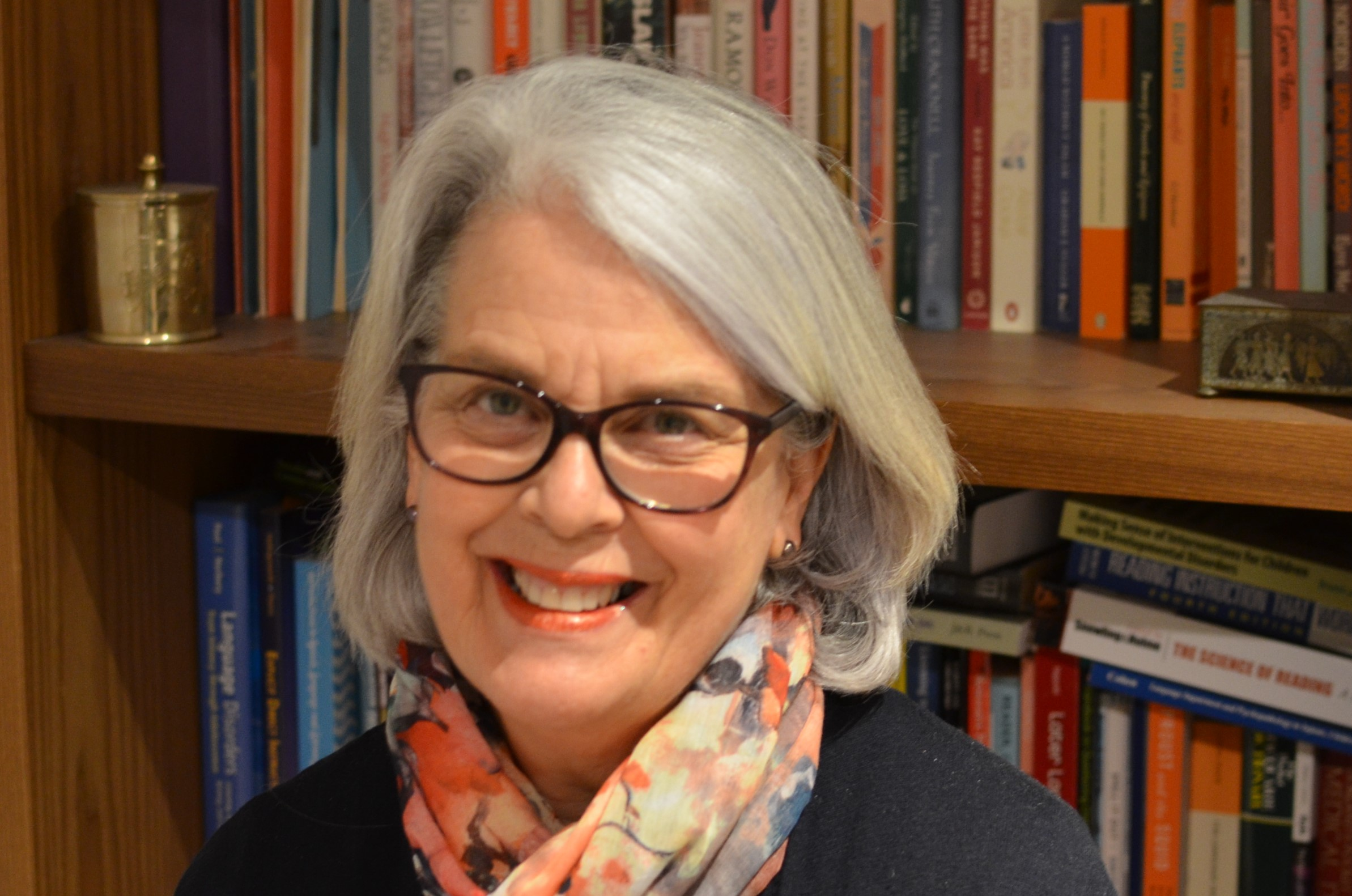
- Education: Lincoln Institute of Health Sciences, Lincoln Institute of Health Sciences, Monash University, La Trobe University
- Occupations: Researcher; speech and language therapist; psychologist
- Academic career
- Fields: Language, perpetrator, literacy
- Institutions: Monash University (2006–2015); La Trobe University (2015–)
- Website: scholars.latrobe.edu.au/pcsnow

Pamela Claire Snow is an Australian speech-language pathologist and registered psychologist whose research concerns language disorders in vulnerable children and adolescents, and their implications for academic achievement and psychosocial wellbeing. She has been a vocal critic of pseudoscientific approaches to early reading instruction and support, such as the Arrowsmith Program.

== Early life and education ==
Pamela Claire Snow completed her BASc in speech pathology and graduate diploma in communication disorders at the Lincoln Institute of Health Science (subsequently absorbed into La Trobe University). She completed her PhD on acquired brain injury in 1997 at La Trobe University, and then a graduate certificate in higher education at Monash University in 1998. She became a registered psychologist in 2003.

== Career and impact ==
Snow worked in medical education at Monash University from 2005 to 2015, becoming an associate professor in 2009. Since 2015, she has been a professor at La Trobe University, forming the Science of Language and Reading (SOLAR) Lab in the School of Education with Tanya Serry in 2020. Through this time, her research has addressed several aspects of language development and disorders and their significance to vulnerability in early life, including mental health and youth offending. She has also been an editor of ACQ, editorial consultant for IJSLP, is on the editorial board of First Language and is an associate editor of The Reading League

Her research has impacted speech-language pathology, education, and justice ranging from how children and adolescents are interviewed as witnesses, suspects, and victims through to treatment and management of rehabilitation after traumatic brain injury. She also translates language and literacy instruction and support research for a general audience, particularly parents, teachers, clinicians, and policy-makers via her blog, The Snow Report. She frequently speaks on how reading is taught in Australian schools and has been a vocal critic of the Arrowsmith Program.

== Awards and honours ==
- Speech Pathology Australia Fellowship (2012) and Life Membership (2020).
- Learning Difficulties Australia Mona Tobias Award (2017).

Snow has additionally won editors' awards for her research publications in 2013 and 2020 and presented the 2015 Elizabeth Usher Memorial Lecture.
