= State Prison at Møgelkær =

Danish prison

- Interactive map of State Prison at Møgelkær
- Location: Møgelkær, Central Denmark Region, Denmark.; 55.7938°N 9.9121°E
- Status: Operational
- Capacity: 176
- Opened: 1945
- Managed by: The Danish Prison and Probation Service
- Warden: Carl Johan Bjørnsholm

The State Prison at Møgelkær is a prison located in Møgelkær in central Denmark. The place where the prison is now located was in the beginning a manor house. Later the location was used as a workplace for young unemployed people. From 1945 to 1973 the place was used as a youth prison until it was transformed into a prison for adults inmates.

== Capacity ==
The State Prison at Møgelkær has a total capacity of 176 where 30 of whom are house in semi-open unit and 28 in a treatment and rehabilitation unit. The prison also have units for only women inmate and a mixed where both men and women serve their sentences together. The prison mainly receives offenders from Jutland and from the Copenhagen area.

== Employment ==
The prisoners at the State Prison at Møgelkær have the opportunity to work in a large range of different jobs during their imprisonment. The prisoners at this prison mostly work with either maintenance of buildings, assembly work, carpentry, metal work and forestry.

== Education programs ==
The prisoners at the State Prison at Møgelkær can attend different education programs including Adult Education, Special Education, Support Education and self-tuition and competency courses.

== Treatment programs ==
The prison offers drug and alcohol rehabilitation, cognitive proficiency and anger management programs and many other treatment programs.

== External reference ==
- The Prisons own website
- The State Prison at Møgelkær - The Danish Prison and Probation Service website
