= Elizabeth Catherine Usher =

Australian speech disorders therapist (1911–1996)

Elizabeth Catherine Usher AO (1911–1996) was a speech disorders therapist and academic. She was the first person from Queensland to study speech therapy.

== Early life ==
Elizabeth Catherine Molphy (later Usher) was born on 16 November 1911 in Lilydale, Victoria. Her father Thomas Molphy, his wife Ella and family moved to Queensland. Usher attended Merrimac State School and Warwick State High School. Elizabeth won a scholarship to train as a teacher attending the Teacher’s Training College in Brisbane. After taking her license, Elizabeth taught at a number of schools, including at Kaimkillenbun, Maclagan, Elbow Valley and Warwick Central State School from 1928 to 1945. She took her teaching licence in elocution. She also took flying lessons at Archerfield Airport before gaining her pilot’s licence in 1936.

== World War II ==
During World War II, Elizabeth Molphy trained as a signals and cipher officer with the WAAAF and later in rehabilitation services. She became engaged to Leon Lyons, a pilot, but he was killed during the war. At the conclusion of the war, she entered a training course offered by the Victorian Council of Speech Therapists. Within two years she had completed her Licentiate at the Australian College of Speech Therapists, becoming the first Queenslander to study to become a speech therapist.

== Professional career ==
Elizabeth Molphy returned to Warwick, Queensland, to live with her parents after completing her course and a position as a speech therapist became available with Dr Basil Stafford’s Psychiatric Clinic, a division of the Brisbane Mental Hospital, in George Street, Brisbane. Usher travelled to Brisbane weekly to take on patients at the Psychiatric Clinic and the nearby Spastic Centre (now Cerebral Palsy Alliance).

Elizabeth travelled to England in 1952 to undertake continuing education, working as a supply teacher to support this training. She took a Bobath therapy course for the treatment of the cerebral palsy. Following her studies, Elizabeth was appointed a speech therapist to the Royal Oxford Hospitals in 1953. While performing her duties, she worked as a therapist at Headington Hill Hall, a hostel for returned soldiers of World War II and the Korean War, who had serious injuries and rehabilitation issues. She met Ken Usher at Headington Hill Hall. He was a former soldier who had suffered significant injuries during World War II. After undertaking further training at Syracuse University in New York during 1953-1954, for patients with hearing impairment and other conditions of the larynx, she returned to Oxford, England and married Ken Usher on 31 July 1954. Now taking her married name, Elizabeth Usher worked as a speech therapist with the London Education Authority.

Ken and Elizabeth Usher moved back to Australia in 1956 and she became the first speech therapist to work full-time at the Queensland Spastic Centre (Cerebral Palsy Alliance). She also resumed her work at the Psychiatric Centre. She saw patients at the Mater Hospital and Greenslopes Repatriation Hospital. The workload was considerable and Usher and three other therapists continued to take on new patients including those at the Subnormal Children’s Centre (now Endeavour Foundation). Usher petitioned for the establishment of a speech therapy course at the University of Queensland, to help provide a facility to train future speech therapists. After a number of years of negotiation, and with the support of the vice chancellor, Sir Fred Schonell, a university course was established in 1962. Usher taught part-time as a lecturer in the course. By 1964, the first group of students had completed the diploma and she was promoted to a full-time lecturer. The course was upgraded to a degree program in 1967.

Usher was awarded an honorary Bachelor of Speech Therapy from the university in 1969. She took her B.A. in 1969. She was made head of the department and senior lecturer from 1971 and reader in 1973. Usher retired from the university in 1977 as an associate professor and head of the Department of Speech and Hearing. She returned to private practice.

== Memberships ==
- Australian College of Speech Therapists from 1948. She was also Vice President of this Association.
- Queensland branch of A.A.S.H. from 1958.
- Queensland Spastic Children's Welfare League
- Oral Deaf Society
- Advisory Committee for SPELD (1971–1979)
- Australian Autistic Children's Association (1971–1977)

== Honours and awards ==
Usher was made an Officer of the Order of Australia in 1990 for her services to persons with communication disabilities.

== Legacy ==
Usher died on 23 December 1996. A travelling scholarship is awarded in her name to a student undertaking speech therapy studies at the University of Queensland. An annual lecture also commemorates her legacy in the profession. A statue was cast in her honour and resides in the Therapies Building at the University of Queensland.
