= Frederick William Everest =

Australian murderer

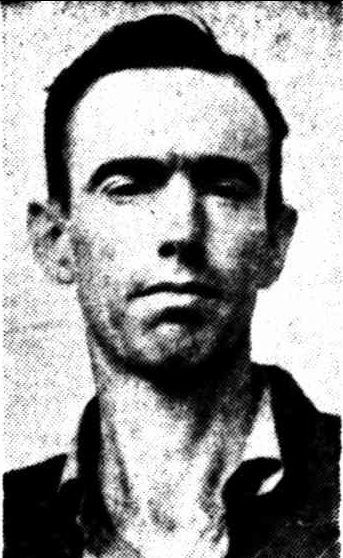
Frederick William Everest, 1945

Frederick William Everest (3 December 1910 – 24 January 1977) was an Australian murderer who killed two American servicemen in Brisbane during World War II. He was known as "The Man in the Grey Suit".

In 1945, aged 34 years old, Everest shot and killed two US military officers, Lt. Allen C. Middleton and Chief Petty Officer John Daniel McCollum, who were among the many American forces stationed in Brisbane at the time.

== First murder ==
Everest killed Middleton on 11 January at a lavatory near the Customs House. A man was seen fleeing the scene of the crime in a grey suit and the killer became dubbed "The Man in the Grey Suit".

== Second murder ==
He fatally injured McCollum at Denman Street, Alderley on 24 January with a sawn-off shotgun. The police heard reports that shots had been fired in a house at Farrington Street, Alderley. A squad of detectives arrived but could not find anything. They went into an adjoining street, Denman Street, and found McCollum had been shot in the abdomen. He told the detectives he had opened the back door of a house he was renting in answer to a knock and had been shot. McCollum managed to give a description of the man, then was taken to hospital, where he was operated on but died at 10pm.

Everest had been delivering bread in the local area. Police tracked him down and arrested him.

== Sentencing ==
Everest was a mentally ill returned soldier who believed that "those Yanks" had tried to poison him. He was found to be mentally ill and spent the rest of his days in a mental hospital, initially Goodna Mental Hospital.

Frederick William Everest died in 1977 in Brisbane.
