= Elinor Wray =

First Australian speech therapist

- Wray in 1917
- Born: Elinor Caroline Wray; 30 October 1899; Chatswood, New South Wales, Australia
- Died: 4 February 1992 (aged 92); St Leonards, New South Wales, Australia
- Known for: established the first speech therapy facility in Australia

Elinor Caroline Wray MBE (30 October 1899 – 4 February 1992) was an Australian speech therapist.

== Life ==
Wray was born in Chatswood in 1899. She was the last child of Annie Charlotte (born McDonald) and Arthur Gore Wray. Her father who was a draftsman did not approve of his only daughter having a minds of her own, but that is who she was. She went to school in the northern Sydney suburb of Beecroft at Miss Long's school and she established an interest in amateur dramatics and in elocution.

Wray saved up enough money to go and study speech therapy at the Central School of Speech and Drama and St Thomas' Hospital in London, as well as observing speech therapy practice at St Bartholomew's Hospital and King's College Hospital. She then spent three months observing at the London County Council Stammering Centres before returning to Sydney in 1929.

When she returned she could not establish herself as a speech therapist and she became a nurse. She met (Sir) Robert Blakeway Wade who was an Australian orthopaedic surgeon and he supported her ambition. She was able to demonstrate progress with his cleft palate patients. The first speech therapy clinic opened in 1931 at the Royal Alexandra Hospital for Children with Wray in charge.

She was a founding member of Australia's association for speech therapists in 1944. Speech therapy seems to have stopped during the war as in 1949 the Royal Alexandra Hospital for Children were restarting their courses. Wray pointed out that children could have poor reading ages but this could be due entirely to speech problems. Therapy would follow any necessary surgery if it was required. Other symptoms could include bad behaviour. Children who had speech disabilities could leave without them. The minister of education was to supply scholarships for three children who could not afford the usual fees. This was the same year as the Australian College of Speech Therapists was established.

In 1958, she founded a "Lost Chord Club" as a self-help group for people who had had laryngectomees.

On 13 June 1981, Wray became a Member of the Order of the British Empire (MBE) in recognition of her contribution to speech therapy in the 1981 Birthday Honours.

Wray died in St Leonards in 1992.

== Personal life ==
Wray never married. She was a vegetarian and enjoyed gardening, swimming and walking.
