= Speech Pathology Australia =

Australian professional organisation

Speech Pathology Australia (SPA) is the national peak body for the speech pathology profession in Australia.

== History of the association ==
Established in 1949, SPA began as the Australian College of Speech Therapists, set up to regulate and maintain the qualifications and standards of the profession. The Australian Branch of the British Medical Association "granted the Australian College of Speech Therapists full professional recognition as the examining, qualifying and representative body for speech therapy within the Commonwealth".

The new organisation combined the Victorian Council of Speech Therapy, the Australian Association of Speech Therapists (New South Wales), the South Australian Council of Speech Science and Speech Therapy, and the Council for Speech Therapy (Western Australia), and granted members the right to practice in the United Kingdom.

In 1974–75, the organisation became the Australian Association of Speech & Hearing. The association no longer conducted examinations nor granted licentiates to graduates, a responsibility that was taken over by tertiary institutions.

In 1996 the organisation became the Speech Pathology Association of Australia Ltd and adopted the public name of Speech Pathology Australia.

== Speech therapy in Australia and Elinor Wray ==
Sydney-born Elinor Wray undertook speech therapy training at the Central School of Speech and Drama and St Thomas' Hospital in London, as well as observing speech therapy practice at St Bartholomew's Hospital and King's College Hospital. She then spent three months observing at the London County Council Stammering Centres before returning to Sydney in 1929 to establish the first Australian speech therapy service.

Appointed in an honorary capacity at the Royal Alexandra Hospital for Children at Camperdown, Sydney (now located at Westmead) on the recommendation of surgeon (and later president of the hospital) Sir Robert Wade in 1931, Wray voluntarily conducted three clinics weekly for the next seven years, initially working with Sir Robert's cleft palate patients. The resulting positive outcomes led to the creation of the first hospital speech therapy clinic and the speech pathology profession in Australia.

Wray continued to work as a speech therapist until she retired and Speech Pathology Australia's outstanding contribution to the profession award is named in her honour. Wray died at the age of 98 in 1992.

== Membership ==
Association membership is available to all applicants with approved qualifications in speech pathology from an Australian accredited university course and students enrolled in a recognised Australian accredited course by the Association.

== Code of Ethics ==
All members are bound by the Association's Code of Ethics to ensure the responsible and ethical practice of speech pathologists. The Code of Ethics outlines in detail the values, principles and standards of practice all members must follow.

== Overseas accreditation ==
As the recognised national professional standards organisation for speech pathologists in Australia, the Association is recognised by the Department of Education, Employment and Workplace Relations (DEEWR) as the assessing authority for speech pathologists intending to apply for skilled migration to Australia. Most employers in Australia require prospective employees to be eligible for practising membership of Speech Pathology Australia.

A mutual recognition agreement has been in place since 2004 and now includes the American Speech-Language-Hearing Association (United States), Speech-Language and Audiology Canada, the Irish Association of Speech and Language Therapists, the New Zealand Speech-Language Therapists' Association and the Royal College of Speech and Language (United Kingdom).

== Speech pathology courses in Australia ==
There are a number of university courses throughout Australia which offer entry-level training for speech pathologists. Courses may be an undergraduate (Bachelor) or graduate entry (Masters) degree.

The Federal Government of Australia, Department of Education and the Department of Employment recognises Speech Pathology Australia as the professional body representing speech pathologists in Australia and for their role in assessing qualifications required for practice in Australia.

Speech Pathology Australia has the further important role of accrediting university programs that offer training courses at both undergraduate and postgraduate levels. The Competency Based Occupational Standards for Speech Pathologists (CBOS 2011) details the knowledge, skills and attributes required for graduate entry into the profession of speech pathology. All entry level degree programs in Australia, whether undergraduate or post graduate, are assessed to the same CBOS 2011 standards in the accreditation process. University speech pathology programs that are accredited by Speech Pathology Australia have demonstrated that their graduates have attained CBOS entry level competencies and are thus eligible for practising membership to Speech Pathology Australia.

Courses are invited to undergo initial accreditation or re-accreditation evaluation. New courses are encouraged to complete accreditation prior to the graduation of their first cohort of students. (See below for new courses who have initiated an accreditation evaluation).

Speech pathology courses holding accreditation with Speech Pathology Australia can be seen on the Association's website.

== Speech Pathology Week ==
The annual awareness week, Speech Pathology Week, is held in August to raise awareness of the speech pathology profession and the work done by speech pathologist with the more than 1.1 million Australians who have a communication or swallowing disorder that impacts on their daily life.

Communication is a basic human right and Speech Pathology Week seeks to promote this fact.

== Book of the Year Awards ==
Since 2003, Speech Pathology Australia annually awards three Australian authors the "Best Book for Language and Literacy Development" in the following categories:

- Birth to 3 years
- 3 to 5 years
- 5 to 8 years
- 8 to 10 years
- Indigenous Children.

Each award is based on the book's appeal to children, interactive quality and ability to assist speech pathologists and parents in communication and literacy development.

The Speech Pathology Book of the Year Awards encourage reading and engage young minds.

== Publishing ==
The society publishes a number of journals:

- International Journal of Speech-Language Pathology
- Journal of Clinical Practice in Speech-Language Pathology (previously ACQuiring Knowledge in Speech, Language and Hearing)

And a professional magazine for speech pathologists:

- Speak Out

== Notable members ==
Notable members include:

- Michelle Lincoln, speech pathologist and academic
- Pamela Claire Snow, speech pathologist and academic
- Elizabeth Catherine Usher AO (1911–1996), pioneering speech therapist and academic
