= Michelle Lincoln =

Michelle Lincoln is a Professor and the Deputy Vice-Chancellor (Academic) at the University of Canberra, Australia. Her research spans all areas of allied health service delivery and workforce, with a particular focus on rural, remote and Indigenous communities. She has published more than 130 peer reviewed journal papers, books and chapters and been funded by the National Health and Medical Research Council and the Australian Research Council. As a senior university leader, she co-led the University of Canberra's Sports Strategy and Connected Decadal Strategy.

== Education ==
Lincoln received a Bachelor of Applied Science (Speech Pathology) from the University of Sydney in 1987 and was awarded her PhD in Speech Pathology from the University of Sydney in 1997.

== Career ==
Lincoln has held multiple academic roles over the past thirty years. Most recently she was the Executive Dean of the Faculty of Health, University of Canberra where she played a key role in promoting the role and impact that health and sport professionals play in the lives of people and communities, as well as preparing the future allied health workforce. Prior to joining the University of Canberra, she was the Deputy Dean, Associate Dean Learning and Teaching and the Head of Discipline of Speech Pathology in the Faculty of Health Sciences, University of Sydney. Now, as the Deputy Vice-Chancellor Academic, Professor Lincoln leads the University’s academic program of work.

In addition to her role at the University, Lincoln has held and holds a number of external leadership positions. She was the inaugural chair of the Asia Pacific Education Collaboration in Speech Pathology. She is the current Deputy Chair of the board of Australian Council of Deans of Health Sciences, a member of the ACT Health Wellbeing and Partnership Board, and a member of the Allied Health Leadership Alliance and the Health Professions Education Standing Group of Universities Australia. She is also a mentor for both Franklin Women and the Minerva Foundation.

== Publications ==
As at 2024, Lincoln has written 11 books and chapters and 128 peer-reviewed journal articles. She has an H-index of 53 and over 7,800 citations, according to Google Scholar. Her research outputs span allied health service delivery and workforce particularly in rural, remote and Indigenous communities, as well as education research spanning competency-based assessment in clinical settings, clinical education models, ethical development and interprofessional learning.

Select publications include:

- Keane, S., Lincoln, M., Smith, T. (2012). Retention of allied health professionals in rural New South Wales: a thematic analysis of focus group discussions. BMC Health Services Research, 12: 1–11.
- Lincoln, M., McAllister, L. (1993). Peer learning in clinical education. Medical Teacher, 15(1): 17–26.
- Nolan-Isles, D., Macniven, R., Hunter, K., Gwynn, J., Lincoln, M.… Gwynne, K. (2021). Enablers and barriers to accessing healthcare services for Aboriginal people in New South Wales, Australia. International Journal of Environmental Research and Public Health, 18(6):3014.
- Onslow, M., C Andrews, C., M Lincoln, M. (1994). A control/experimental trial of an operant treatment for early stuttering. Journal of Speech, Language, and Hearing Research, 37(6): 1244–1259.

== Awards ==
Lincoln has won the following university and national teaching awards for her educational expertise in speech pathology:

- 2013 - Support of the Student Experience Teaching Award, The University of Sydney
- 2009 - Award for programs that enhance learning, Australian Learning and Teaching Council
- 2006 - Citation for Outstanding Contributions to Student Learning, The University of Sydney
- 2005 - Vice Chancellor's Award for Outstanding Teaching, The University of Sydney

She is a Fellow of Speech Pathology Australia and a Principal Fellow of the Higher Education Academy
