= Anger management =

Therapy for anger prevention and control

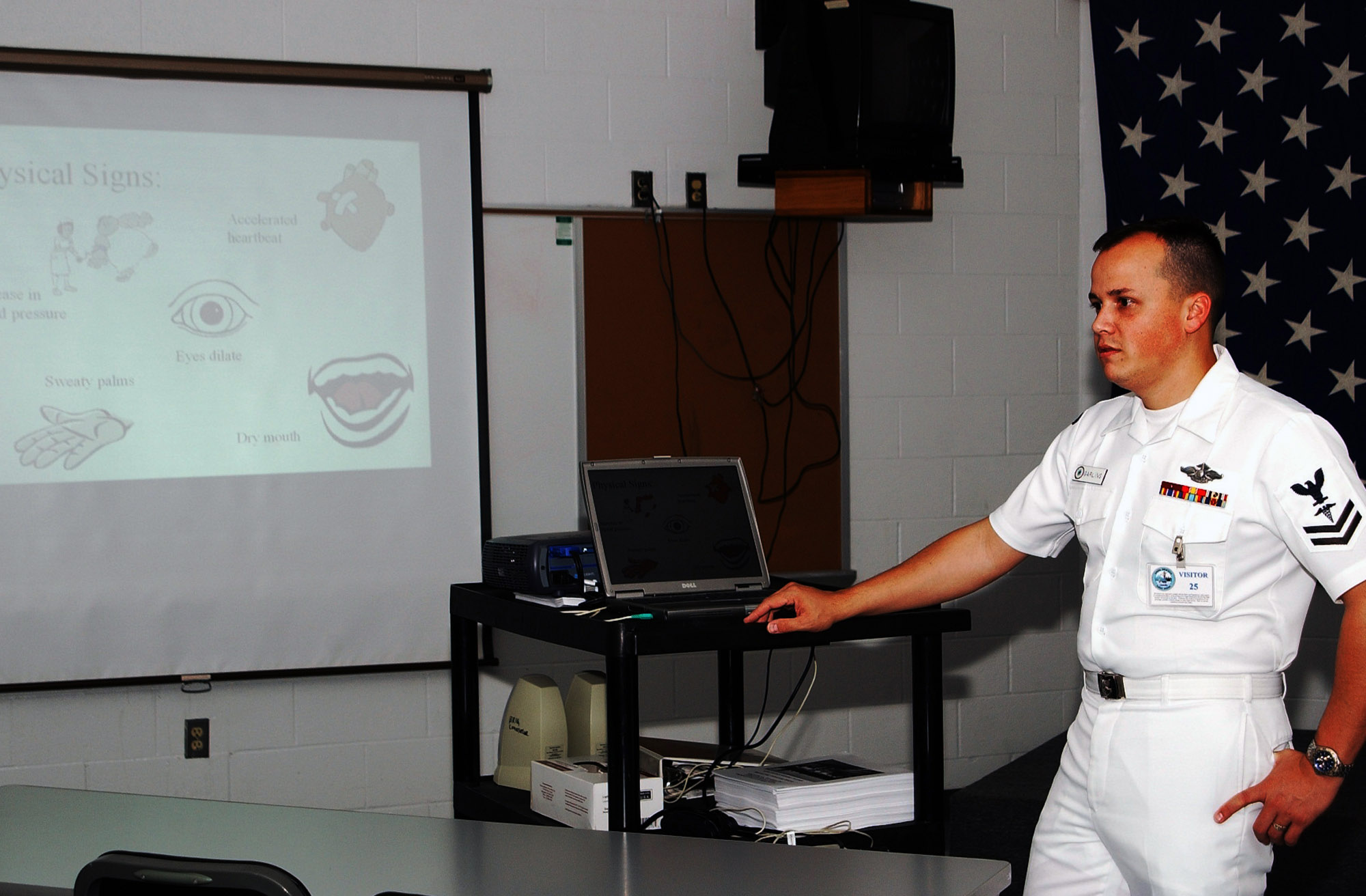
A US Navy Hospital Corpsman teaching an anger management lesson

Anger management is a psycho-therapeutic program for anger prevention and control. It has been described as deploying anger successfully and efficiently.

Anger is frequently a result of frustration, or of feeling blocked or thwarted from something the subject feels is important. Anger can also be a defensive response to underlying fear or feelings of vulnerability or powerlessness. Anger management programs consider anger to be caused by an identifiable reason, which can be logically analyzed and addressed.

== Overview ==
The ideal goal of anger management is to control and regulate anger so that it does not result in problems. Anger is an active emotion that calls a person feeling it to respond. People get into anger issues because both the instigator and instigated lack interpersonal and social skills to maintain self-control. The experience of anger reduces impulse control and harms decision-making. People can learn to respond to their anger as unwanted and unpleasant rather than react to its need. Turning a blind eye or forgiveness is a tool to turn anger off. Getting enough sleep, exercising, and eating a good diet can all help to prevent anger.

One study showed that people with anger management problems tend to not internalize blame for their actions. Encouraging people with anger issues to adopt a more empathetic and complex theory of mind is one approach to anger management.

== History ==
In de Ira, Seneca the Younger (4 BC – 65 AD) advised for pre-emptively guarding against confrontational situations, perspective taking, and not inciting anger in anger-prone individuals. Other philosophers echoed Seneca with Galen recommending seeking out a mentor for aid in anger reduction.

In the Middle Ages, saints generally advocated for meekness and humility, but some distinguished between rational anger (expressed as zeal or self-discipline to combat evil) and irrational anger (which one saint compared to a "dragon").

Modern anger management programs are based on psychological research. Classical psychotherapy based anger management interventions originated in the 1970s. Success in treating anxiety with cognitive behavioral therapy (CBT) interventions developed by Meichebaum inspired Novaco to modify the stress inoculation training to be suitable for anger management. Meichebaum, and later Novaco, viewed each aspect of experiencing the relevant emotion as an opportunity to improve a patient's overall well-being with cogntive behavioral approches.

== Potential causes of anger issues ==
Drug addiction, alcoholism, a mental disability, biochemical changes and PTSD can all lead to a person committing an aggressive act against another person.

Prolonged or intense anger and frustration have been linked to physical conditions such as headaches, digestive problems, high blood pressure and heart disease.

Problems dealing with angry feelings may be linked to psychological disorders such as anxiety or depression.

Angry outbursts can be a way of trying to cope with underlying unhappiness or depression.

Parenting practices, child abuse, and exposure to domestic violence all correlate with aggressive behavior in children.

A 2013 study of children with migraine found that there was a correlation between inhibited anger and higher frequency of migraine attacks.

PTSD is correlated with increased anger; in longitudinal studies, PTSD leads to anger, but anger does not lead to PTSD.

Cognitive Biases: Hostile attribrution bias - the tendency to consistently interpret neutral or ambiguous actions by others as intentional provocations or threats- frequently underpins chronic anger and explosive responses. Chronic rumination on perceived slights or historical grievances also prolongs anger states.

== Types of treatment ==
Keeping anger under control can be difficult. There are methods to managing anger from taking a time out to interacting with others by using I versus you

Anger treatments' success rates can be difficult to estimate because excessive, severe anger is not a recognized disorder in the Diagnostic and Statistical Manual of Mental Disorders. Some research does exist on comparing various treatments for anger, but they also describe methodological difficulties in making accurate comparisons. The best practice for anger treatment is to use multiple techniques rather than a single technique. The relaxation approach had the highest success rate as a standalone treatment. The effectiveness of the CBT-based anger management therapies has been evaluated by a number of meta-analyses. In a 1998 meta-analysis with 50 studies and 1640 individuals, measures of anger and aggression were used to compare the effects of the anger management intervention with no treatment. A significant effect for anger management was found with a 67% chance of improvement for individuals having received the anger management as compared to the individuals without the therapy. In addition, a 2009 meta-analysis compared psychological treatments for anger across 96 studies. After an average of 8 sessions, a significant improvement in anger reduction resulted. Overall, the completion of an anger management program is likely to result in long-lasting positive changes in behavior. Successful interventions can result in not only a reduction of the outward display of aggression, but also a decrease in the internal level of anger.

Some effective anger management techniques include relaxation techniques, monitored breathing exercises, cognitive restructuring and imagery (e.g. Stosny's Healing imagery Explain oneself emphatically what and why it makes you respond angrily Apply kindness and compassion to self Love oneself Solving the co-morbid problems phases), problem solving, improving communication strategies and interpersonal skills (DEAR MAN & GIVE).

=== Decreasing arousal ===
A 2024 meta-analysis of 154 studies found that anger management treatments that focus on decreasing arousal are effective in decreasing anger and aggression. These include breathwork, mindfulness and meditation.

Relaxation therapy can reduce cognition and motivations to act out, and through relaxation, clients gain coping skills to better manage their anger. This therapy addresses various aspects of anger such as physiological, cognitive, behavioral, and social. These aspects combined are what make relaxation an effective treatment for anger. Mindfulness attempts to teach clients acceptance of bodily sensations and emotions. Mindfulness originated in Eastern spiritual traditions that are practiced through meditation. A two-prong component of mindfulness includes: self-regulation and orientation toward the present moment. The center of this therapy technique is experiencing the present moment in a non-judgmental manner that is reflective of meditation. In practice, clients observe breathing, sitting and walking during meditations. The goal is for clients to understand that his or her thoughts of anger are merely thoughts rather than reality. Mindfulness is also a technique used in the relaxation approach because the technique halts physiological arousal. An example of this is Meditation on the Soles of the Feet (SoF) which has been shown to help persons with mild intellectual disability decrease aggressive behavior by mindfully focusing on the soles of their feet.

=== Prevention and Relationship Enhancement Program ===
The Prevention and Relationship Enhancement Program (PREP) is a program that was used in a study consisting of Air Force families. The families were assigned to either a traditional multi-couple group format or a self-directed book version focusing on relationship satisfaction and anger management skills. There was a significant main effect for time related to both relationship satisfaction (pretest M = 49.8, SD = 17.6; post-test M = 53.8, SD = 17.6, F(1, 76) = 6.91, p < .01), and anger management skills, (pretest M = 32.2, SD = 4.2; post-test M = 34.6, SD = 4.0, F(1, 74) = 31.79, p < .001).

=== Cognitive behavioral therapy ===
The use of cognitive behavioral therapy (CBT) is frequent in anger management treatment. By trying to get patients to open up about their emotions and feelings and being driven to accomplish a specific task (in this case controlling anger), a person is cognitively motivated to use positive skills towards their behavior.

Studies show using a mix of CBT as well as other therapies on the participants/clients increased the effective usage of the anger management techniques and that they also felt more in control of their own anger. Personal changes like these can lead to less aggression and fewer violent acts. The use of play therapy with this is also found efficient in tackling anger issues among children.

Rational emotive behavior therapy explains anger through the client's beliefs and emotion, rather than the event itself. The concept involves clients interpreting events in a rational manner in order to avoid irrational thoughts that lead to anger. Delayed reaction technique is when clients attempt to uncover what is making them angry before acting out on their anger. This allows them to have time to change what is making them angry and increase time before their response; this encourages thought on a more rational level. In addition, clients are also encouraged to avoid demands in an anti-oppressive order to avoid anger. An example of a demand placed on a client may be that, "I have to have this done by my standards". Research is starting to show that the better individuals understand what anger management is and how it can help them personally and in relationships, aggressive actions are less likely to occur.

=== Positive mentalization and personal development ===
This is a style that is commonly used in elementary schools for students expressing anger outbursts. Researchers who have looked into the reason for young student anger have found that one common reason could be the inability to adjust socially. Students that were selected for this study received a daily one-hour session throughout one week of school. The researchers of the mentalization program educated children through group therapy in positive psychology and tried to do activities that put the child in a happy mood while interacting. At the end of the week, research showed that there was a negative correlation between anger and social adjustment. This process lowered the overall anger levels of the students involved in social adjustment deficits.

Use of personal development (PD) led to higher views of themselves and more positive self-esteem. Aggression has been shown to be a result of poor self-worth as well as thinking that those around us do not care or support us, so this PD is vital in helping change a person's self-perception.

=== Anger journaling ===
Understanding one's own emotions can be a crucial piece of learning how to deal with anger. Children who wrote down their negative emotions in an "anger diary" actually ended up improving their emotional understanding, which in turn led to less aggression. When it comes to dealing with their emotions, children show the ability to learn best by seeing direct examples of instances that led to certain levels of anger. By seeing the reasons why they got angry, they can in the future try to avoid those actions or be prepared for the feeling they experience if they do find themselves doing something that typically results in them being angry.

Simply logging episodes of anger could also be beneficial. Middle school students with emotional disorders who completed regular "anger logs" showed pronounced improvement of anger management. According to Keller, Bry and Salvador, students who used anger logs "were observed to exhibit significantly more prosocial behaviors toward their teachers and showed a trend toward exhibiting fewer negative behaviors toward peers".

Reflecting on feelings of anger in writing can be a type of Cognitive Behavioral Intervention (CBI), or a self-strategy used to combat negative thoughts.

=== Medication ===
As anger is a psychological concern, treating with medication is a secondary line of approach. However, if there is a medical reason for an anger response certain psychotropic medications are prescribed by doctors to complement the psychotherapy intervention. Medications include antidepressants, anti-psychotics, anti-seizure medications, and beta blockers. These drugs specifically do not target anger directly, but they have a calming outcome that can support control of rage and negative feeling.

Antidepressants may have a particular role when anger is a manifestation of depression. Anger attacks are found in 40% of those with major depressive disorder with 64–71% of cases responding to an SSRI such as fluoxetine.

=== Other evidence-based approaches ===
Anger management interventions are based in cognitive behavioral techniques and follow in a three-step process. First, the client learns to identify situations that can potentially trigger the feeling of anger. A situation that elicits anger is often referred to as an anger cue. If a potential trigger can be avoided, the individual can not only avoid unwanted outbursts, but also avoid internal conflict. Often anger occurs through automatic thought and irrational beliefs, these pose a problem for treatment because the patient may respond too quickly to change the thought or behavior. Wright, Day, & Howells referred to this phenomenon as the "hijacking of the cognitive system by the emotional system". Second, relaxation techniques are taught as appropriate responses to the identified situations. Common techniques include regulating breathing and physically removing themselves from the situation. Finally, role-play is used to practice the application of the learned techniques for future encounters with anger-inducing situations in the individual's life. The result of repetition is an automatic response of learned beneficial techniques.

=== Catharsis ===
Following psychoanalytic theory, there is a belief that expressing anger can reduce it through catharsis. A 2024 meta-analysis found no evidence for this hypothesis. Anger management interventions that increased arousal (such as hitting a bag, jogging or cycling) had no effect on anger and aggression.

== Affected populations ==
=== Adults ===
Caretakers of individuals with dementia often encounter high feelings of frustration. Skills training for such caretakers—both anger management and depression management—reduce negative affect and increase use of positive coping mechanisms.

Anger management is also beneficial in law enforcement. The role of police officers is to protect civilians, however, conflicts between the police and the general public can develop. The goal of anger management would be to reduce such occurrences like police brutality from negatively impacting the relationship between law enforcement and citizens. Anger management programs tailored towards this goal could orient themselves towards these means by focusing on conflict resolution and including specific law enforcement scenarios in the training. This need was noticed by Novaco, who originally designed an intervention for anger management based on cognitive behavioral therapy, resulting in a specialized skills training program for law enforcement.

Negative anger management tactics (like escalating behaviors and negative attributions to others) correlate with women's perpetrating violence against dating partners.

=== Children and adolescents ===
Anger management programs with a cognitive-behavioral basis have been modified for children and adolescents. There are three common CBT skills in youth programs: life skills development (communication, empathy, assertiveness, etc.) uses modeling to teach appropriate reactions to anger; emotional identification, to identify feelings of anger and relaxation; and problem solving to understand the causes and effects of different situations.

A wide range of methods can be used to convey these three components, with both age and severity being important factors. For younger children, involvement can be increased by presenting anger management in more of a fun format with educational games and activities. For adolescents, group therapy can be an effective form given the resemblance to the individual's natural social environment.

The true value from early interventions aimed at youths comes from the preventative aspect. Curbing negative behaviors early in life could lead to a more positive outlook as an adult.

The effectiveness of anger management has been studied in children and adolescents for the purpose of evaluating existing programs and designing more effective programs. In a meta-analyses of 40 studies, an overall effect size of 0.67 was found for CBT anger management treatment, suggesting anger management as a legitimate approach to problematic levels of anger. Skills development (0.79) and problem solving (0.67) both had a higher impact than affective education (0.36). This was believed to be due to behavioral aspects being more easily conveyed than cognitive for children.

In another meta-analysis of studies on school-aged children, looking at approaches to reduce bullying, found that a variety of anger management approaches were successful in reducing students' anger, aggression, and loss of self-control.

A 2010 study looked at four 4th grade boys who took part in an anger management program with the school psychologist, ranging from how to deal with emotions to practicing anger reduction strategies. Participating in the program led to reduced anger in a multitude of locations (school, home, etc.).

=== Individuals with intellectual disabilities ===
Individuals with intellectual disabilities can struggle with managing anger. When faced with aggression from individuals with an intellectual disability, caretakers often employ a combination of four different strategies. Depending on both the setting and individual, the following strategies for aggression minimization present in different ways.

1. Reactive strategies – Aim to minimize impact of overtly aggressive behavior by using established protocols. E.g., enforced isolation after the start of a violent outburst.
2. Ecological interventions – Attempt to reduce aggression level by changing an aspect of the environment for a more calming effect. E.g., reducing ambient noise to lower irritation.
3. Contingency management – Focuses on modifying behavior through a combination of reinforcement and punishment. E.g., using a token economy to enforce rules concerning behavior.
4. Positive programming – Teaches positive reaction skills as an alternative to aggression. E.g., anger management with a CBT background.

The need for anger management is also evident in situations where individuals with intellectual disabilities are prescribed psychotropic medication as the result of aggressive or self-injurious behavior. The medication's role as a chemical restraint does not help modify the underlying cause of aggression.

In a meta-analysis reviewing 80 studies, behavioral-based interventions were found to be generally effective in modifying aggressive behavior in people with mild intellectual disability. Additionally, cognitive behavioral therapy as administered by lay therapists was found to be effective, which supports the feasibility of such anger management programs.

Research shows over half of the population of Americans with intellectual disabilities displays violent and aggressive actions somewhat regularly. People with a learning disability tend to express anger and aggression to even those who help them on a daily basis. Adults with intellectual disabilities are at high risk of acting aggressive and being sent to clinics due to their actions.

=== Criminals ===
One study found that offenders in high-security hospitals who went through a 20-class training program had positive results. Results of the self-report showed a sustained reductions in feelings of anger, a decrease in physical aggression, and an increase in verbal aggression.

=== People with PTSD ===
This group can benefit from extended CBT dealing with anger management issues. One study dealing with n=86 war veterans found that during the 12 sessions of training, anger traits slightly dropped as well as small reductions in expressing anger. Research also indicates that their antisocial personality traits upon return can put them behind in society, so finding the right anger management courses is of vital importance. There were not significant enough findings from this study to definitely recommend veterans with PTSD to use CBT anger management courses.

=== People with traumatic brain injuries ===
People with a traumatic brain injury (TBI) can display impulsive, aggressive and dangerous actions. A study in the Brain Injury showed that one way to prevent such actions is a community-based treatment of people with TBI. Results indicated that the need to lash out diminished after the 12-week program, and a series of post-treatment testing showed a decline in self-reported frequency of angry actions. Other specific results included: significant decreases in the frequency of experiencing angry feelings and the frequency of outward expression of anger as well as significant increases in the frequency of controlling feelings of anger.

== Associated scholars ==
=== Seneca ===
One of the first people to study anger and the control of anger was the Roman philosopher Seneca. He studied anger during his lifetime, c. 4 BC – AD 65, and from his experiences and observations, he formulated ways to control anger. This could be considered an early form of anger management. Seneca noted the importance of how to avoid becoming angry, quitting being angry, and dealing with anger in other people. Before him, Athenodorus Cananites (74 BC – 7 AD) counseled Octavian to recite the alphabet before acting in anger.

Another theorist who came after Seneca was Galen, a Roman era philosopher, who built on the work of Seneca to formulate new ideas in the area of anger management. Galen stresses the importance of a mentor to help deal with excess anger.

=== Peter Stearns ===
Sir Peter Stearns played an important part in researching the differences in anger between genders. Stearns concluded that there are similarities between male and females experience of anger. June Crawford came up with an opposing idea about how the two genders deal with anger. Her research concluded that men and women deal with anger by different means.

=== Raymond Novaco ===
Works from Raymond Novaco in the 1970s have contributed to many of the recent ideas on the management of anger. These ideas have led to the implementation of different anger management programs. Novaco stressed the importance of looking at the situations that led up to the anger in order to have control over the anger. He stated that anger is an emotional response to situations, and that anger occurs in three modalities, either cognitive, somaticaffective or behavioral. After discovering the anger, there should be discussion and self-examination in order to relieve the anger. This process was thought to help the client identify the situations that lead to anger and deal with the anger depending on the step that the anger is occurring in. The client is able to use different relaxation skills to reduce their anger before it advances.

== Benefits ==
Anger management style and overall level of anger has been associated with both acute and chronic pain sensitivity. Blood pressure is another physiological aspect affected by anger, with increased levels of anger being correlated with higher blood pressure. The implications of an effect on blood pressure for overall health is made evident by the link between high blood pressure and the increased risk of cardiovascular disease. An increase in the immune system's efficacy has also been observed as a result of the increased level of relaxation.

== Impediments ==
There are a number of factors that can lower the probability of a successful anger management intervention. One such obstacle is the level of the individual's motivation. Overall low readiness is an impediment to the effectiveness of anger management due to the lower attendance rates and negative effect on the therapeutic alliance. Involuntary assignment to an anger management program, for example court mandated sessions, will result in a lower average motivation level than voluntary admission. In one study with incarcerated inmates, there was a correlation found between individual readiness and improvement.

Additionally, given the component of anger as a social construct, difficulty with communication between cultures can serve as another impediment. What is deemed an appropriate expression of anger is culturally dependent. Therefore, a mismatch between client and therapist could result in a misunderstanding as to the end goal of the program. For example, a client could only wish to decrease physical violence, while the therapist aims to decrease both verbal and physical outbursts. Gender-dependent expectations of anger expression can contribute as well to societal standards. The same violent outburst for a man and woman is subject to different interpretations due to anger being seen as more permissible in males.

The cost of taking anger management could also be a significant obstacle if the person does not have health insurance. The time required for anger management depends on the program. Weekly one-hour sessions with eight to 12 sessions per program are common, but a single intensive all-day session variety exists as well. The monetary cost can amount to $90–$120 per session for general therapy, or much higher fees for specialized coaching. The availability of anger management programs locally can be problematic for more isolated areas, creating an additional cost for travel. However, online options can follow the same structure as an in-person intervention with similar outcomes.

== See also ==
- Anger Management (film)
- Assertiveness
- Conflict
- De-escalation
- Emotional self-regulation
- Nonviolence
- Stress management
