= Megan McAuliffe =

New Zealand professor of psychology, speech and hearing

Academic background
- Education: University of Queensland
- Thesis: An investigation of articulation and speech rate in Parkinson's disease (2003)

Megan Jane McAuliffe is a New Zealand academic, and is a full professor at the University of Canterbury, specialising in speech production changes due to neurological injury, disease and ageing.

== Academic career ==
McAuliffe completed a PhD titled An investigation of articulation and speech rate in Parkinson's disease at the University of Queensland. McAuliffe then joined the faculty of the Department of Communication Disorders at the University of Canterbury, rising to full professor. As of 2024 she is the Dean of Postgraduate Research and Deputy Vice-Chancellor - Research. McAuliffe is co-director, with Catherine Theys, of the Speech-Language Neuroscience Lab at Canterbury.

McAuliffe's research has been funded by the Health Research Council of New Zealand, and she has served on the HRC grant assessment committee and on the Canterbury Medical Research Foundation scientific assessment committee. McAuliffe was an editor on the Journal of Speech, Language, and Hearing Research from 2017 to 2020.

McAuliffe's research focuses on neurological causes of speech impairment, called dysarthria, and she is particularly interested in comparing speech production and perception during healthy ageing and neurological impairment, such as Parkinson's disease. She has explored how speech production changes due to accent, ageing and neurological disease and injury. She has commented on why people with foreign accent syndrome, who have typically experienced neurological injury or impairment, feel they experience a change of accent.

== Selected works ==
- Stephanie A Borrie; McAuliffe, Megan J.; Julie M Liss (2011). "Perceptual learning of dysarthric speech: a review of experimental studies". Journal of Speech, Language, and Hearing Research. 55 (1): 290–305. doi:10.1044/1092-4388(2011/10-0349). PMC 3738172. PMID 22199185. Wikidata Q30451133.
- McAuliffe, Megan J.; Baylor, Carolyn; Yorkston, Kathryn M. (2016). "Variables associated with communicative participation in Parkinson's disease and its relationship to measures of health-related quality-of-life". International Journal of Speech-Language Pathology. 19 (4): 407–417. doi:10.1080/17549507.2016.1193900. PMC 6190828. PMID 27347713. Wikidata Q39652614.
- Stephanie A Borrie; McAuliffe, Megan J.; Julie M Liss; Cecilia Kirk; O'Beirne, Greg; Anderson, Tim J. (2012). "Familiarisation conditions and the mechanisms that underlie improved recognition of dysarthric speech". Language and Cognitive Processes. 27 (7–8): 1039–1055. doi:10.1080/01690965.2011.610596. PMC 3760733. PMID 24009401. Wikidata Q30449807.
- McAuliffe, Megan J.; Ward, Elizabeth; Bruce E Murdoch (2006). "Speech production in Parkinson's disease: I. An electropalatographic investigation of tongue-palate contact patterns". Clinical Linguistics and Phonetics. 20 (1): 1–18. doi:10.1080/02699200400001044. PMID 16393795. Wikidata Q82175563.
- McAuliffe, Megan J.; Elizabeth M R Gibson; Sarah E Kerr; Anderson, Tim J.; Patrick J LaShell (2013). "Vocabulary influences older and younger listeners' processing of dysarthric speech". Journal of the Acoustical Society of America. 134 (2): 1358–1368. doi:10.1121/1.4812764. PMID 23927132. Wikidata Q50356717.
- McAuliffe, Megan J.; Ward, Elizabeth; Bruce E Murdoch; Anna M Farrell (2005). "A nonspeech investigation of tongue function in Parkinson's disease". The Journals of Gerontology. 60 (5): 667–674. doi:10.1093/gerona/60.5.667. PMID 15972622. Wikidata Q81880294.
- McAuliffe, Megan J.; Ward, Elizabeth; L Bassett; K Perkins (2000). "Functional speech outcomes after laryngectomy and pharyngolaryngectomy". JAMA Otolaryngology. 126 (6): 705–709. doi:10.1001/archotol.126.6.705. PMID 10864105. Wikidata Q73917805.
