= The Park Centre for Mental Health =

The Park Centre for Mental Health Treatment, Research & Education
- Queensland Health
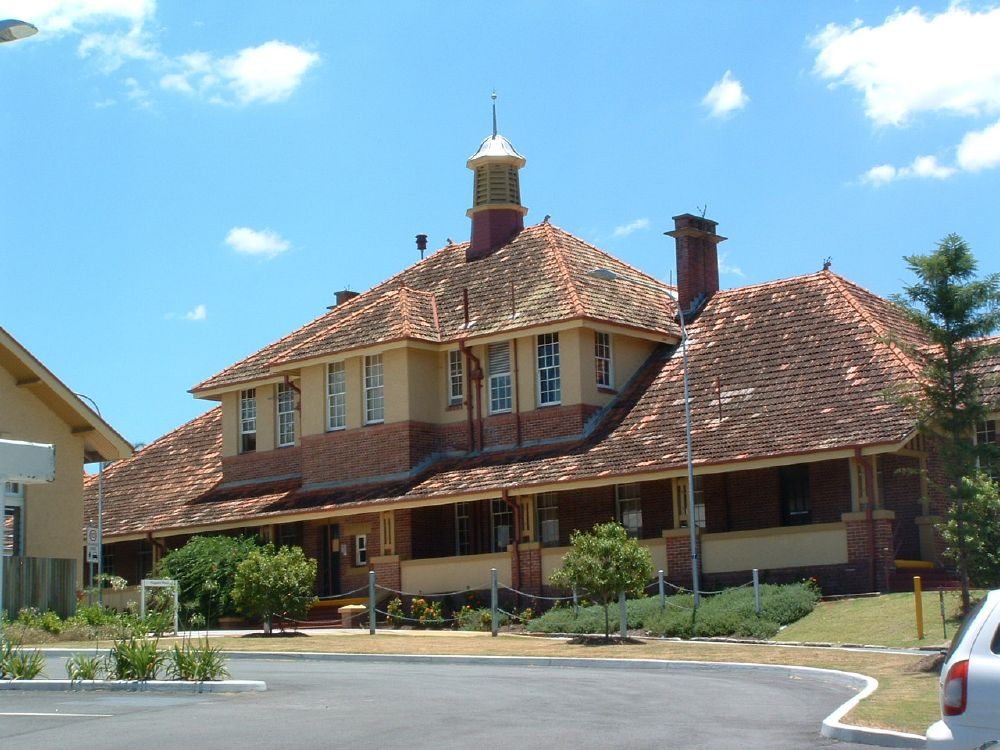
- Administration building, 2001

Geography
- Location: Wacol, Queensland, Queensland, Australia
- Coordinates: 27.5993°S 152.9103°E

Organisation
- Care system: Medicare
- Type: Secure psychiatric facility

Services
- Emergency department: no emergency services
- Beds: 192

History
- Founded: 1865

Links
- Website: Official Website

The Park Centre for Mental Health
- Location within Queensland
- 27.5918°S 152.9077°E
- Location: 60 Grindle Road, Wacol, City of Brisbane, Queensland, Australia

History
- Built: 1866–1923

Site notes
- Architect: Kersey Cannan
- Architectural styles: Arts & Crafts, Classicism

Queensland Heritage Register
- Official name: Wolston Park Hospital Complex, Goodna Hospital for the Insane, Goodna Mental Hospital, Woogaroo Lunatic Asylum
- Type: state heritage (archaeological, built, landscape)
- Designated: 21 October 1992
- Reference no.: 600340
- Significant period: 1860s–1960s (fabric); 1860s–ongoing (historical, social)

The Park Centre for Mental Health is a heritage-listed psychiatric hospital at 60 Grindle Road, Wacol, City of Brisbane, Queensland, Australia. It is one of the largest psychiatric hospitals in Australia. The hospital provides a range of mental health services, including extended inpatient care, mental health research, education and a high security psychiatric unit. It was designed by Kersey Cannan and built from 1866 to 1923. It is also known as Goodna Hospital for the Insane, Goodna Mental Hospital, Woogaroo Lunatic Asylum, and Wolston Park Hospital Complex. It was added to the Queensland Heritage Register on 21 October 1992.

The Wolston Park Hospital Complex, opened in 1865, occupies a 450-hectare (1,100-acre) site on the banks of the Brisbane River at Wacol and encompasses a number of mental health facilities and ancillary services operated by the Queensland government since inception of the asylum.

The hospital employs around 450 people, including 220 nurses and 20 doctors. There are also another 80 allied health staff, and 50 administration personnel. In addition there are 70 support staff, including maintenance, groundskeeping, security and laundry staff.

== History ==
=== Planning ===
Prior to 1859, mentally ill people in the colony of Queensland had been sent to Sydney. Following the Separation of Queensland, they were lodged instead at the Brisbane Gaol. In 1861 the government instructed Colonial Architect Charles Tiffin to report on a suitable site and draw up plans for a 400-bed asylum. Tiffin recommended an area of land on the banks of the Brisbane River halfway between Brisbane and Ipswich, which was rejected by the Queensland Government in favour of another site close by, upstream at the junction of the Brisbane River and Woogaroo Creek.

The site of the new asylum had "been formerly occupied by the residence of Dr Stephen Simpson, the Commissioner of Crown lands." Dr Simpson was appointed Commissioner for Crown Lands for the Moreton Bay District in 1842 when the area was first opened up for free settlement following the closure of the Moreton Bay penal settlement. He was also the acting administrator, until the arrival of John Clements Wickham, and a Justice of the Peace. Simpson's first home in the colony, built in 1843–1844, was at Woogaroo. In 1851, when the opportunity to buy land in the area arose, he purchased 640 acres to the east and soon built Wolston House further down the Brisbane River.

An 1861 survey plan indicates the presence of a house between the mouth of Woogaroo Creek and the small dam which still exists to the east of the current Wolston Park Golf Club clubhouse. If this plan is accurate, the house, most likely Simpson's, would have been sited just south-west of the clubhouse. Late 1860s plans of the asylum's original buildings indicate that they were located at the east end of the current clubhouse.

=== Construction ===
Tenders for the first stage of construction of the asylum were let in 1863 and by the end of 1864 sufficient buildings were completed for the asylum to begin operation. The Woogaroo Lunatic Asylum opened on 10 January 1865. On 12 January, seven prison warders (two of them women) and ten police constables escorted 57 male and 12 female lunatics from Brisbane Gaol to Woogaroo, travelling by river on the steamer Settler. The 69 patients were accommodated in a two-storeyed brick building initially intended to be the administration block (no longer extant). Male patients were accommodated on the first floor and part of the ground floor. Females occupied a section of the ground floor. A tall timber fence surrounded the building and timber outbuildings accommodated a kitchen, bathroom and staff areas. Dr Kersey Cannan was appointed as Superintendent and a residence was constructed for him on the site (no longer extant). This first stage of the asylum was located at the southern end of the site between the Brisbane River and Woogaroo Creek, with the river providing access to the site. Plans of the site made c. 1869 and in 1878, indicate that a cemetery or graveyard was established at the far western end of the site, near the confluence of Woogaroo Creek and the Brisbane River.

In 1866 a ward for fee-paying patients was erected on an adjacent ridge about 400 metres (1,300 ft) to the east of the main buildings (later Female Wards 1 & 2). The building was constructed from local sandstone extracted from a nearby sandstone quarry formerly owned by Joshua Jeays, which was also the source of stone for the construction of Parliament House in 1864. The superintendent Dr Canaan claimed responsibility for the building's design, based on principles recommended in the standard treatise on asylum construction, The Construction and Government of Lunatic Asylums of 1847 by John Conolly. The Woogaroo Asylum was not, however, in a position to receive fee-paying patients and the building was unoccupied for two years until alterations were made so that female patients could be transferred to this block. A second storey was added, constructed to the design of Charles Tiffin in 1875, and other substantial alterations and additions were made to the building in both 1904 and 1923. This building accommodated female patients for over 100 years.

=== Inquiries ===
In 1867 the first of many Government inquiries into the operations of the asylum took place, with the Government appointing Dr Henry Challinor to investigate conditions there. Two further inquiries occurred in 1869 - the first inquiry was conducted by public servants, and the second by a select committee of members from both houses of Queensland Parliament. Dr Cannan was dismissed from his post as a result of the first inquiry. The second inquiry revealed a multitude of mistakes and incompetency and a number of its conclusions related to the inappropriate and insufficient accommodation on site and the improvement of cooking facilities and the provision of a decent water supply. On the recommendation of the select committee, the Queensland Government introduced the Lunacy Act of 1869, based on similar legislation in other Australian colonies and Britain.

It was not until a Royal Commission was established in 1877 to investigate Woogaroo Asylum and other reception houses in the colony that the Government was forced to take the continuing problems at the asylum more seriously. Despite the construction of two cottage wards in the early 1870s (no longer extant), overcrowding remained a chronic problem and the commission urged the construction of additional wards, improvements to existing cells, upgrading of services, the planting of shade trees, the establishment of recreation facilities and the provision of employment for patients. A modest building program began in 1878 with the construction of a cottage ward for 60 female patients and continued with a block of cells for troublesome female patients in 1879, two wards each for 35 patients in the male and female sections in 1880 as well as the construction of a kitchen and laundry building to service 500 patients (these buildings are no longer extant).

In August 2024, the Queensland Government commissioned an independent review into treatment and care provided at Wolston Park Hospital between 1950 and 2000. The review was led by mental health expert Professor Robert Bland AM and provided former patients, residents, family members and carers with an opportunity to share their experiences. The review was established following calls from former patients and advocates for greater recognition of historical treatment practices at the institution. Participation was voluntary and the review was intended as a trauma-informed truth-telling process rather than a legal inquiry or compensation scheme. The final report was released on 19 December 2025.

The report documented accounts from former patients and families describing physical abuse, sexual violence, overmedication, misuse of electroconvulsive therapy, institutional neglect, and other alleged human rights abuses occurring during the review period. The review identified recurring themes relating to treatment practices, systemic failures, and the long-term impacts experienced by former patients and their families. Queensland Health noted that the report presented participants' reported experiences and was not intended to determine liability or make findings regarding the factual accuracy of individual allegations. The report was released publicly alongside a collection of participant stories to acknowledge the experiences of those affected by the hospital's operations.Review-into-wolston-park-hospital

=== Expansion ===
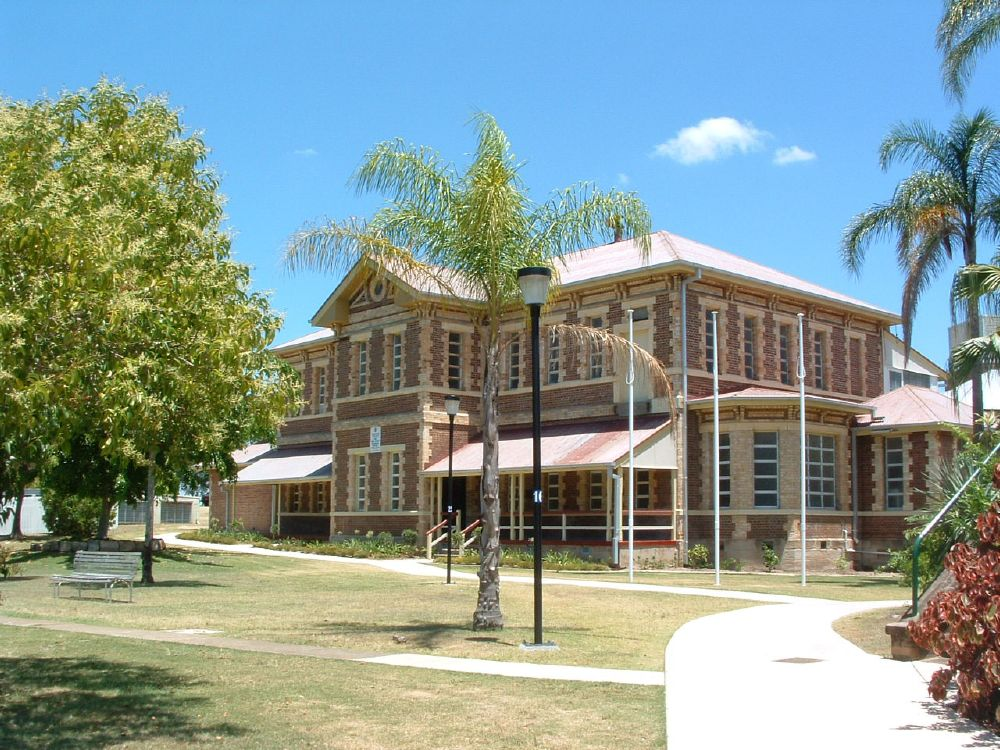
Bostock House, 2001

A boom in the Queensland economy and a major increase in expenditure on public works was the impetus for a more substantial building program at the asylum during the 1880s. At the same time, the population of the state was increasing rapidly and accompanying social changes brought greater numbers of admissions to the asylum, then known as the Goodna Asylum. The hospital population doubled in the two decades from 1880. Two new cottage wards (one of which is now known as Bostock House, 1885) and a refractory ward were erected in the female section and a new refractory ward was constructed (no longer extant) and major additions to the existing No 1 ward were undertaken in the male section. Despite this new work, conditions for patients scarcely improved as the additional accommodation barely matched the growth in patient numbers. New legislation was introduced with the Insanity Act of 1884 replacing the Lunacy Act of 1869. It was modelled on New South Wales legislation and reflected the growing medicalisation of the treatment of madness. The term lunacy was replaced by insanity and the institution where such persons were treated became known as a hospital for the insane rather than an asylum. This Act consolidated the State's role in the treatment and regulation of insane people and remained in force for over fifty years.

=== Flooding ===
In 1890 the asylum experienced severe flooding as the Brisbane River rose to a height of 40 feet (12 m), the highest level ever recorded. The entire male section was inundated; buildings, fences and other structures were seriously damaged and patients had to be re-located. The decision was made to abandon the low-lying area near the river where the main male section was located and consolidate it on higher ground where two wards had already been erected. The relocation brought the complex closer to the Main Line railway (opened in 1875), which replaced the river as the primary means of access to the hospital. The Recreation Hall was erected in 1890 and was used as a sewing room by female patients during the days and was also available for dances, concerts and church services.

The male section was further damaged by in the 1893 Brisbane flood that also inundated the main staff residences. In line with the decision to relocate the male section on higher ground, work began on an outdoor recreation area and Fleming House, a two storeyed brick building with accommodation for 50 male patients, was opened in 1898. Verandahs were located at ground level on the northern side of the building, overlooking the cricket oval that had been laid out by patient labour. The same year, a substantial brick residence (now Manor House), replacing a timber house badly damaged by the 1893 flood, was erected for the new medical superintendent, James Hogg, appointed in 1898. The residence was located on high ground but with its main elevation facing south-east, away from the asylum complex. Most of the other staff resided off the site. For many decades the hospital was serviced by employees who lived in the local area and there are now a number of staff who have a family history of employment at the complex going back generations. During Hogg's period in charge, the complex became known as the Goodna Hospital for the Insane.

=== Further expansion ===
The most significant building project of the early 1900s involved extensive alterations and additions to the original female ward. A new level was built on the existing building that significantly increased accommodation. A large two-storeyed block, the male no. 4 ward (no longer extant) was also completed, bringing the male section to a well-defined group of eight buildings. A new morgue and two brick bathroom blocks were constructed in 1902. (Both bathroom blocks remain, one of which is now known as Dawson Annexe).

=== Changes in treatment and accommodation from 1908 ===
Following the sudden death of James Hogg in 1908, Henry Byam Ellerton was appointed to replace him as superintendent of Goodna and Chief Inspector of Hospitals for the Insane. Conscious of the need to find the very best possible candidate, the Queensland Government had advertised widely for the position, including in Britain. Ellerton was chosen from a list of twenty-six applicants and had fourteen years experience in English asylums. He was an ardent advocate of "moral treatment" or moral therapy. Moral treatment marked a major turning point in an understanding of madness and insanity. Formerly regarded as the total absence or distortion of reason and incapable of cure, insanity came to be seen as a product of an immoral or defective social environment, thus mentally ill people could be improved in an appropriate and elevating environment. A critical aspect of moral treatment was the provision of a pleasant environment, with an emphasis on well-lit and ventilated buildings with adequate bathing facilities, reasonably sized rooms with sufficient openings and views to the landscape. Recreation and employment were also considered a vital part of the therapeutic process.

Ellerton was superintendent of the hospital for 28 years, retiring in 1936. In this period, Wolston Park acquired its modern form with the construction of the core of its buildings and the consolidation of the institutional environment. Ellerton's vision was to create an integrated and self-sufficient community, the grounds became gardens and wooden fences were replaced with less claustrophobic wire ones. A large bush house, 100 yards long and 20 yards wide, was established in 1911 to maintain a steady supply of pot plants for the wards and recreation hall and to provide seedlings and young plants for the gardens throughout the asylum (no longer extant). The institution was opened up to visits from relatives and friends and recreational activities became integral to the asylum's operations. While aesthetically pleasing gardens and views were considered parts of the therapeutic process, the grounds were also important to the public image of the institution. A pleasant landscaped environment with gardens, scrubs and open space suggested the asylum was a benign institution and belied its true character as a place where overcrowding was chronic and patients were strictly controlled and managed. In 1916 the hospital was again improved with the addition of a ward for those suffering a physical disease as well as a mental disorder.

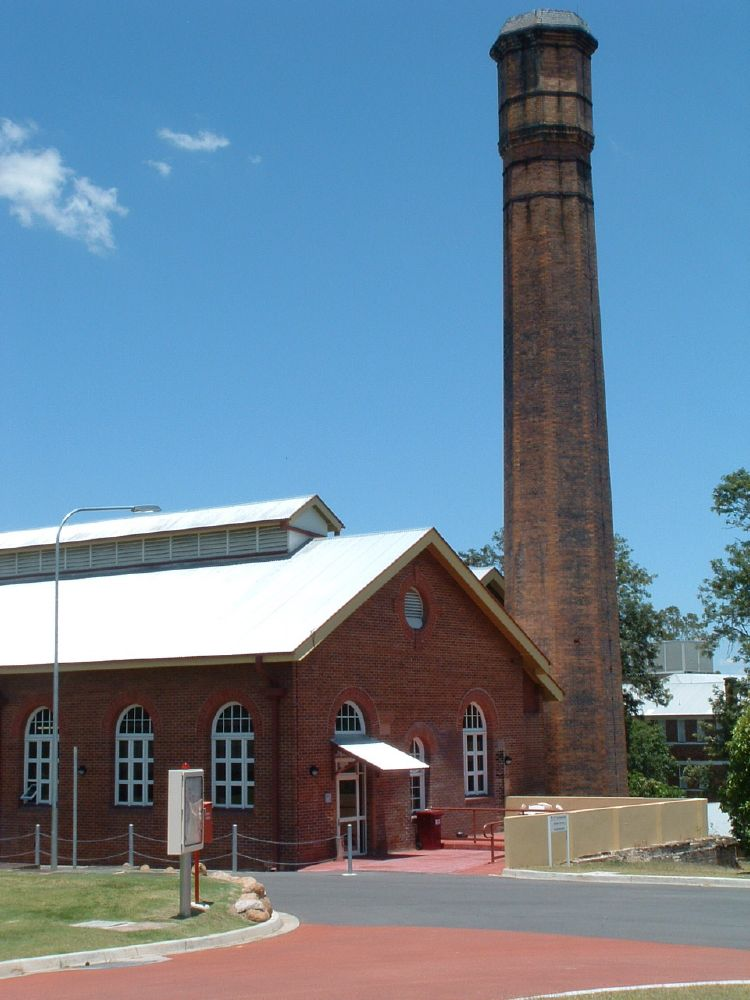
Powerhouse, 2001

During Ellerton's reign, existing male wards were demolished and Lewis House, Noble House and McDonnell House were completed in 1915. A new bridge over Woogaroo Creek was completed in 1916. A female admission ward, Anderson House, the hospital, the administration block, the powerhouse, water reservoirs and pumping stations were completed in 1917. The laundry was completed in 1918. Osler House, a ward for difficult female patients was completed in 1929 and Pearce House, for difficult male patients was completed in 1934. The male wards Gladstone House, Jenner House and Kelsey House were completed in 1936. Upon Ellerton's retirement, the male section comprised a total of 13 blocks, all constructed of brick and designed to accommodate between 20 and 120 patients. Despite the upgrading of facilities, overcrowding remained a chronic problem. The increase in beds from 1910 to 1936 failed to correspond to the increase in the number of patients.

Compared with the extensive building program in the male section between 1910 and 1936, improvements in the female section were extremely modest. Ellerton felt that the expansion of the female section was limited due to the topography of the Goodna site and advocated additional female wards at other institutions such as Ipswich Mental Hospital. In the period 1910–1920, the number of female inmates decreased by 20%, falling from 491 to 389 patients and the 1910 female population level was not regained until 1929. Male patients increased by 30% during this period, rising from 779 to 1010.

During Ellerton's period in charge, the asylum had undergone considerable material improvement and a number of essential services such as electricity, water and a hospital had been established. Many of the buildings were well designed and are excellent examples of the output of the Queensland Department of Works during this time. Some of the buildings demonstrated a refinement in approaches to patient care, such as the small and domestic scale Anderson House that was designed to accommodate female patients when they were first admitted so they could be kept under observation and receive more individual treatment than was possible in a large ward. Recreational facilities had vastly improved and the complex now had three tennis courts, a viewing pavilion and terraces and an oval considered one of the best cricket grounds in the state. A golf course had been constructed by patient labour in the 1920s, becoming the well-regarded Gailes Golf Club, which continued to be a source of employment for patients in the upkeep and maintenance of the greens. Patients were also employed in farming activities that aided the hospital's self-sufficiency. Farm activities included a piggery, dairy, a small cattle herd, vegetable and crop growing including oats, maize and lucerne. However no new techniques or methods of treatment had been introduced. Even the later male wards, Gladstone, Jenner and Kelsey, were still firmly based on the moral therapy model despite their new designs with unusual, crab-like plan forms. The institutionalisation of people with mental illness in Queensland had become an efficient system of control and regulation with an emphasis on confinement rather than treatment or care. More patients than ever were admitted to Goodna and no other solution to the treatment of mental illness was even considered possible.

Ellerton was succeeded as Medical Superintendent by Dr Basil Stafford, the former Superintendent of Ipswich Mental Hospital. Ellerton's retirement provided the opportunity to review the entire mental health system in Queensland and in particular, Ellerton's total commitment to "moral therapy". By the late 1930s psychiatry was a well-established specialty internationally, though still in its infancy in Australia and Stafford was alert to the changes psychiatry was bringing to the treatment of mental illness. In 1937 he was sent by the Queensland government to attend the 2nd International Congress on Mental Hygiene in Paris and on a study tour of hospitals, psychiatric clinics and universities in the United States, Europe and the United Kingdom.

=== Change of focus from 1938 ===
On his return, Stafford recommended various changes to the mental health system, including the implementation of new legislation. These recommendations led to the Mental Hygiene Act of 1938, which closely resembled the British Mental Treatment Act of 1930. The hospital was again renamed the Goodna Mental Hospital and the hospital was reorganized into two units, one for the chronically ill requiring a secure environment and the other for acute and recovering patients. The Mental Hygiene Act of 1938 brought a focus on prevention and cure through voluntary treatment. Until this time hospitals such as Goodna received only certified patients, most of whom were sent there under a Magistrate's order. However, the transition to a less coercive approach to treatment occurred slowly and in 1947 Stafford reported that only 34 of the total 570 patients had been admitted under the voluntary provisions of the Act.

The ideas of modern treatment introduced by Stafford emphasised the development of a comprehensive psychiatric approach with adequate numbers of qualified medical staff. Insanity was seen as a disease of the brain and like any other disease required hospitalisation of patients and treatment with drugs. He noted:

"Modern treatment demands exhaustive mental and clinical case histories, as well as completely thorough physical examination. This cannot be done by a skeleton staff, however willing".

This approach also brought degrees of specialisation among the staff and hospital procedures. Stafford advocated the separation of chronic wards from those dealing with admission, convalescence and hospital cases. He believed that mental illness "demands active therapy, and treatment must not become merely custodial" and urged the use of new types of treatment such as insulin, cardiazol and electrotherapy.

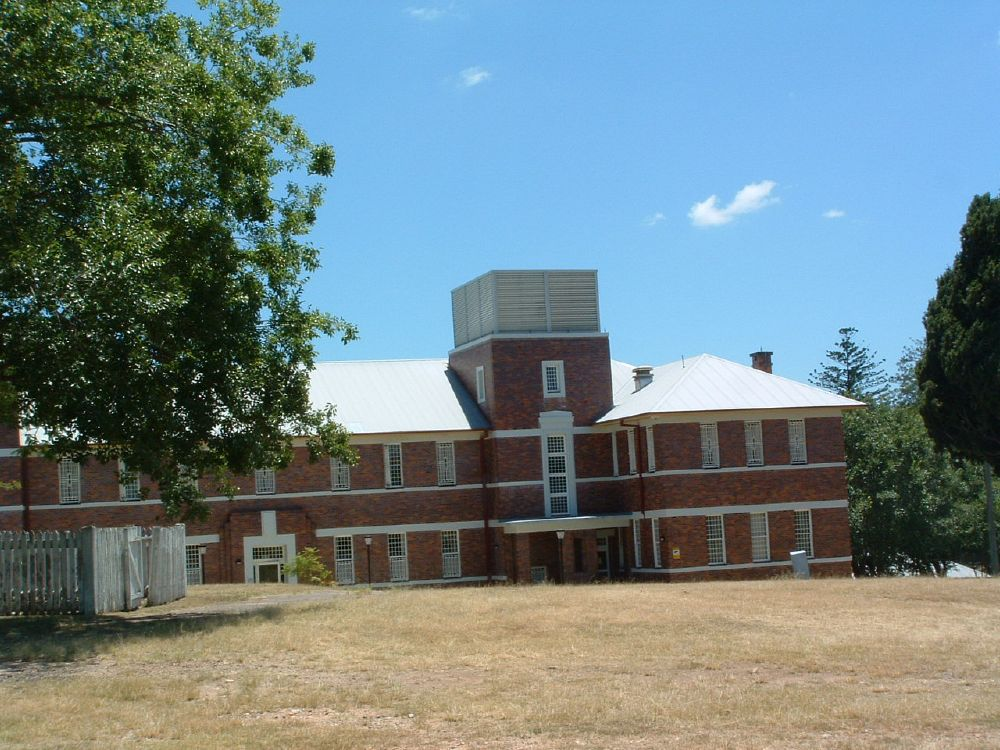
Dawson House, 2001

The first building at Wolston Park to reflect Stafford's modern ideas was Dawson House, a new female building completed in 1944. It provided accommodation for 60 patients and was located on a sloping site close to the existing female wards. It was recognised that a building with a basement could be built on such topography, with the basement accommodating treatment rooms for cardiazol therapy, insulin therapy, malaria therapy, somnifaine or continuous narcosis therapy and other medical treatments. The most striking difference was that minimal attention was given to the outside environment - this building was inward-looking, signalling the demise of the significance placed on the environment in "moral treatment" and the increasing medicalisation of the treatment of mental health. Another important building project for female patients at this time was the construction of a special female recreation facility, which commenced in 1951 on an area of approximately 2.5 hectares (6.2 acres) on the western edge on the reserve, adjacent to the Brisbane River. The principal building within the area was the cafeteria with facilities to serve 500 patients (now Wolston Park Golf Clubhouse). Patients could spend the whole day in the recreation area without needing to return to the wards for midday meals. Other facilities in the area included a sewing room, tennis court, bowling green, a large playing field, viewing shelters and storage sheds. By 1957 more than 200 patients were regularly using the facilities, highlighting the rigorous separation of patients according to gender that operated in all facets of the institution.

By January 1942, 110 returned soldiers were inmates of Goodna Mental Hospital and the Australian Government expressed concern about the growing numbers being admitted. War veterans had become a significant minority of the hospital population since the final years of the First World War and Ellerton had decided upon consideration, that using existing institutions was preferable to building new facilities. During the Second World War, however, the Australian Government agreed to fund the construction of three special wards, with the Queensland Government agreeing to responsibility for the maintenance of the buildings and for staffing. Plans for a complete repatriation unit were prepared by the Works Department in consultation with Basil Stafford. Their design essentially resurrected the principles of "moral treatment" - the buildings were designed to minimise the sense of confinement associated with mental hospitals and freedom was emphasised by wide verandahs and dining areas opening onto grassed courtyards and lawns. Construction of the wards began in 1946, and the Wacol Repatriation Pavilion was opened by Queensland Governor John Lavarack on 26 January 1948. It comprised three wards each with accommodation for 88 patients and a kitchen/canteen block. A recreation hall was erected in 1950 and a cricket oval in 1954.

In the late 1940s, planning began for a new farm ward complex. Farm wards at the hospital had traditionally operated as semi-independent units where patients enjoyed greater levels of freedom and autonomy, unlike the main wards where people were locked in their cells or wards. A new site on the summit of a hill adjacent to the existing farm wards was chosen and two large wards with accommodation for 175 patients and a dining/recreation block were erected between 1953 and 1957. Patients included both "backward persons" and people who had responded well to treatment and had the potential for recovery and discharge. In 1958, part of the farm ward complex was set aside for patients regarded as "subnormal" and in 1964 a five teacher school was established to teach the 160 children who lived there. Gradually, all of this block became occupied by intellectually disabled children and was renamed the Basil Stafford Centre. In 1965 a new alcohol rehabilitation centre was also established, making use of the old farm ward buildings at the northern end of the site. Alcoholics had been patients at Wolston Park since the Inebriates Act of 1892 had allowed for their admission to designated institutions; however, there had been no specific facilities for them. New buildings were erected adjacent to the former farm ward including four wards, offices and an occupational therapy area. The new centre was known as the Wacol Rehabilitation Centre. Initially it served both male and female patients; later a separate complex was built for female patients requiring treatment for alcoholism (Melaleuca House and Poinciana House).

The hospital population peaked in the mid-1950s, with an average of approximately 2500 residents daily (not including Wacol Repatriation Pavilion patients) and 700 staff.

=== Decline in numbers ===
By the late 1950s the efficacy of large-scale, all-purpose institutions for the treatment of mental illness began to be questioned. It was recognised that patients became institutionalised to the extent that living in large institutions perpetuated their mental disorders and did not assist them to recover. The Division of Mental Hygiene embarked on a program of expanding acute psychiatric beds in general hospitals and transferring elderly senile patients from mental hospitals to nursing homes. This resulted in a decline in the number of patients at Goodna and in 1960, Director Basil Stafford was able to report that, for the first time, the hospital had an excess of beds. The complex, renamed the Brisbane Mental Hospital, began to develop a different role. No longer did it cater for every type of patient from every part of Queensland; instead the majority of inmates were long-term chronic patients. The new Mental Health Act of 1962 placed a greater emphasis on voluntary admission and the complex became known as the Brisbane Special Hospital. In 1969, it was renamed Wolston Park Hospital.

In 1976 the Minister for Health released a paper on the Care of the Intellectually Handicapped, which proved to be the catalyst for significant changes in the delivery of mental health services. A special Branch of Intellectually Handicapped Services was established within the Health Department in 1977, which took responsibility for the Basil Stafford Centre. Research into the long-term effects of institutionalisation and the lack of success in the treatment and care provided in institutional settings led to critical questioning of the institutional model for both mentally ill and intellectually and physically disabled people. In addition, the increasing criticism of conditions within mental hospitals and the abuse of patients' rights gave impetus to the development of alternative models, in particular, community-based mental health services. The community care model was adopted slowly in Queensland. Institutions were reformed, however, an emphasis on institutional care remained.

Short-term care with intensive treatment was the preferred model. Several major building projects, which reflected these changing ideas, were undertaken at Wolston Park during the 1970s, as well as extensive re-modelling of existing structures. In 1978, the Barrett Psychiatry Unit was established to provide acute care. It comprised eight separate buildings, a reception and admission block, three wards with 32 beds, two wards with 16 beds, cafeteria and medical officer's flat. In 1984 it expanded to include inpatients and specialised services for young people. A new medical centre opened in 1979 and in 1980 Nyunda Park was set up as an outdoor recreation area. The John Oxley Centre, a forensic psychiatric unit, was built at the eastern side of the site next to the Brisbane River in 1990. A number of the 19th century buildings were demolished in the 1970s and 1980s, with renovation and rehabilitation of other remaining 19th century buildings occurring in the late 1990s.

In 1989 the John Oxley Memorial Hospital, a special purpose secure psychiatric facility, was opened on the grounds of the Wolston Park Hospital; it has since been demolished.

=== Modernisation from 1996 ===
As part of the 1996 Ten Year Mental Health Plan for Queensland, the main hospital became known as The Park Centre for Mental Health and has decentralised its extended care services with a greater emphasis on rehabilitation and recovery. The Park now provides clinical treatment and rehabilitation programs to patients from central and southern Queensland, including care for people with a chronic mental disorder and for people with a mental disorder who are also intellectually disabled, forensic care services and an extended treatment service for adolescents.

From 1999 to 2002 many new buildings were erected, including a large new maximum-security facility at the eastern edge of the site. Most of the new buildings are domestic in scale and character and include accommodation for patients and medical and administrative facilities. Some replace buildings erected during the 1970s, such as parts of the Barrett Psychiatric Centre.

In 2001 the hospital was renamed The Park Centre for Mental Health Treatment, Research & Education.

== Description ==
The Wolston Park Hospital Complex comprises a number of public health institutions, several of which have been decommissioned. The complex includes The Park Centre for Mental Health (former Wolston Park Hospital), Basil Stafford Centre, Wacol Rehabilitation Centre (male and female), Wacol Repatriation Pavilion, Barrett Psychiatric Centre and the John Oxley Centre. Sections of the reserve are leased to the Gailes Golf Club and the Wolston Park Golf Club.

The site can be divided into the following major elements: Central administration area; Services support area; Former residences; Male area; Female area; Female recreation area; Wacol Repatriation Pavilion; Wacol Rehabilitation Centre; Basil Stafford Centre; Nyunda Park/riverbank area and the Grounds in general.

=== Central Administration Area ===
The central administration area includes the Administration building, the Former Hospital, Pump houses and reservoir, Chapel, and Visitor's Pavilion.

The Administration Building (1917) is a two-storeyed brick building with a terracotta-tiled roof, decorative flèche and brick chimneys, designed to be the centrepiece of the institution. Arts and Crafts influences are evident in the massing of the hipped roof forms and the use of unpainted brickwork contrasting with coloured roughcast plaster above sill height. The main entrance on the eastern elevation features an arched port cochere, adjacent to an oval driveway with formal landscape elements, including plantings of cycads. The entrance is given greater prominence by two tower-like wings with separate hipped roof located on either side of the port cochere. There is a verandah on the ground floor on the western elevation with brick and timber piers and stairs located both centrally and at each end. Internally the building comprises office accommodation arranged off central hallways with regular arched partitions. The rooms generally have plastered masonry partition walls with timber joinery. The building has a central timber staircase and some stained timber and glass partition walls. An Honour Board is located in the entry hall on the ground floor.

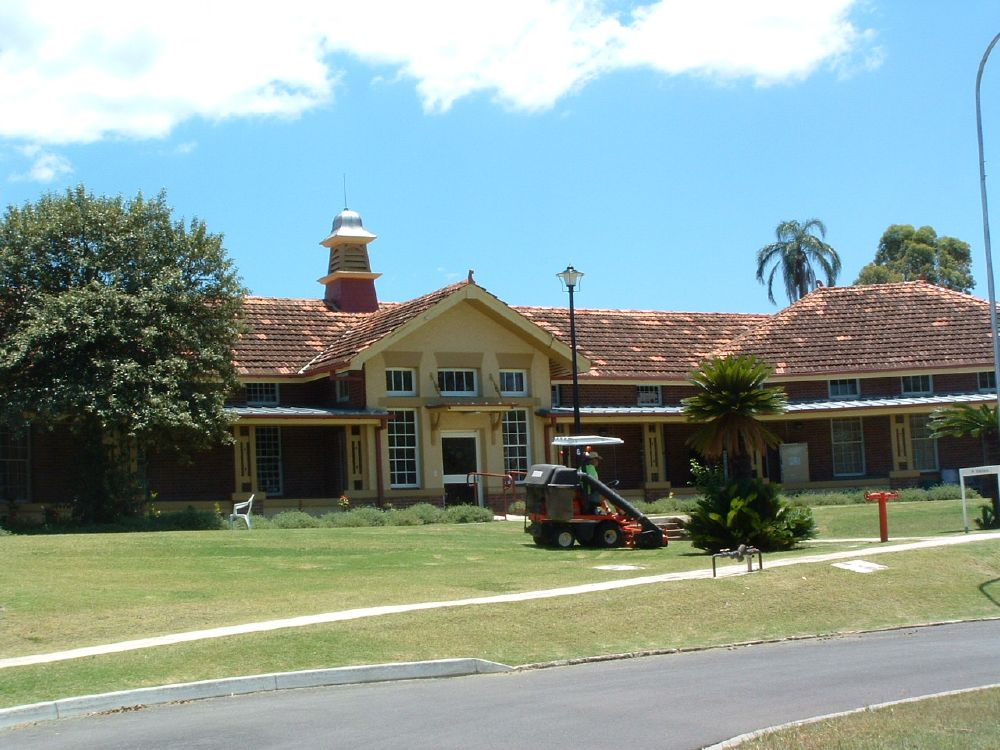
Former Hospital, 2001

The Former Hospital (1917) is located to the north of the Administration Building, across grassed terraces built by patients. It is a low-set, single-storeyed, symmetrical brick building with hipped terracotta-tiled roofs and a decorative fleche, sympathetic in design to the Administration Building. The entrance is marked by a projecting entry bay with gable roof and the wings of the building extend to either side. A slightly elevated verandah with brick and timber piers runs the length of the front elevation of the building and floor to ceiling multi-paned sash windows are located along all walls. Small windows are also located above the verandah roof and below the eaves of the main roof. The rear of the building has five small projecting wings, some no more than the size of a single room. The central projecting wing is the largest. It was the former operating room and has a five-sided projecting bay with large windows in each section. Timber sash windows with concrete sills and lintels are found throughout the building. The interior of the building contains office accommodation for clinical staff.

The pump houses and reservoir (1914) are located adjacent to Ellerton Drive, the principal access to the administration area. There are two timber pump houses, an elevated water reservoir and a second smaller reservoir. The northern pump house (1914) located closest to the road is sheeted with pine chamferboards and has vented semi-circular openings above all its windows. It has a hipped corrugated steel roof with exposed rafters and no gutters. The second pump house (date unknown) is located to the east and sits beneath a large tree. It is a smaller building, clad in timber weatherboards and has a pitched corrugated steel roof with galvanized iron awnings over two windows. Both pump houses are empty. The main reservoir (1914) is constructed of rendered brickwork approximately 5 metres (16 ft) deep, enclosed by a structure consisting of 2-metre (6 ft 7 in) high cast iron columns which support an open, lattice-framed perimeter truss. The truss supports a timber framed roof structure and the entire structure is clad on both the roof and walls in corrugated galvanized iron.

A Visitor's Pavilion (1920) is located further along Ellerton Drive, on the same side as the pump houses and reservoir but closer to the Administration Building. It is a small, low-set, hexagonal timber structure accessed by a short set of timber steps. The entry is a small projecting bay with a pitched roof, decorative timber mouldings, lattice and balustrade. The building is clad in timber weatherboards, has timber framed windows and a painted corrugated steel roof with decorative finial.

One chapel building (formerly the Chapel of Hope, 1961) remains of the three chapels originally erected around a ring road about 100 metres (330 ft) east of the Administration Building. It is a simple, box-like structure with a low-pitched roof and wide eaves. It is of portal frame construction and is clad in corrugated Colorbond steel sheeting. The building is now semi-integrated with a new building built on its western side. A tall, steel, open-frame tower is located on the eastern side of the front elevation. A statue of St Dymphna (the Catholic Patron Saint of the Mentally Ill) is located about 20 metres (66 ft) to the east.

=== Services Support Area ===
The Services Support Area comprises the Recreation Hall, Laundry, Power House and Morgue and is located to the west of the Administration Building.

The Recreation Hall (1890) is a symmetrical rectangular brick building with a pitched roof. The front elevation has a central elevated doorway surmounted by a decorative circular window with coloured glass and quoins accentuated in light, contrasting brickwork, a decorative detail that is repeated around the windows and doors. The building has a large central hall area with separate wings running down each side. The central hall space has a partly lined raked ceiling from which the lower members of the roof trusses protrude and a timber floor. There is a raised timber stage at the southern end with a proscenium arch with decorative Ionic pilasters on either side. A projection room is located at the northern end of the hall. Dark brick additions with flat roofs run the full length of the building on both the east and west elevations and accommodate smaller recreation rooms and a kitchen.

The Laundry (1918) is a large single-storeyed brick building on concrete foundations, with a concrete floor. Its architectural details show an Art and Crafts influence. The building has four large gabled roofs, each of which has two raised roof lanterns that allow light to penetrate the large interior spaces of the building. Externally, the building sits on a face brick plinth with roughcast stucco, painted pale yellow, above the windowsill level. The southern elevation is characterised by striking sets of windows under each gable – each section has a large central window with arched head and side windows, all highlighted with contrasting brick surrounds and accentuated keystones. A flat roofed verandah is located on the western elevation and is accessed by a concrete ramp. There are also a series of large timber double doors and sets of louvres along this elevation. The eastern elevation runs parallel to the street and has regular sets of tall windows grouped in threes. The interior of the building has large concrete pillars supporting exposed timber roof trusses. Recent offices, meeting rooms and conference rooms have been constructed within the building and are enclosed with plasterboard partitions. A canteen is located in the northwestern corner of the building.

The Power House (1917) is an imposing red brick building with a substantial, octagonal brick chimney at its northwestern corner. It has two steel-trussed gabled roofs clad in corrugated galvanized iron with raised vented roof lantern running the length of the building. It is built on concrete foundations and contains Babcock & Wilcox tube boilers. Regular arched openings are on all sides of the building; some have sets of nine windows and others have doors. All the arches are highlighted externally by the use of bricks of a slightly deeper red tone. Circular windows are located in the gable ends on the northern and southern elevations. The upper floor has recently constructed offices, built as a free-standing series of rooms within the larger interior space of the building. These offices are constructed of plasterboard. Some internal walls are finished to a height of six feet with white enamelled brick with green trim. The huge boilers and other engineering equipment are located on the ground floor.

The Morgue (1902) is a low-set single-storeyed brick building situated below the Power House, to the north. It has a simple rectangular plan form with a hipped corrugated iron roof with a small decorative fleche. A lean-to structure with large timber doors on the western end of the building is a hearse shed. The building has large openings with concrete lintels and sills, with boarded-up openings.

=== Former residences ===
The former Medical Superintendent's Residence and Assistant Medical Superintendent's Residence are located at the eastern edge of the site.

The former Medical Superintendent's Residence (1898) is now situated within the strongly fenced, high-security area of the complex and is used as office accommodation. It is a substantial low-set brick residence with a corrugated steel roof. It has an asymmetrical plan with projecting bay windows and complex verandah forms. The eastern elevation has two projecting verandah wings with multi-faceted roofs and tall brick chimneys. The verandahs have timber balustrades, columns and decorative capitals. Two service wings extend from the rear of the building. The residence has a generous entrance hall, several marble fireplaces and high-quality timber joinery throughout the interior.

The Assistant Medical Superintendent's Residence (1912) is located to the east of the former Medical Superintendent's Residence. It is a large timber dwelling set on stumps, with a hipped corrugated iron roof and extensive verandahs. The interior has timber joinery, two fireplaces and pressed metal ceilings in the major rooms. Mature palm trees are formally set around the house and both residences are surrounded by terraced lawn areas. A concrete garden stair is located to the south of the former Assistant Medical Superintendent's Residence, leading to an unfenced former tennis court.

=== Male Area ===
The Male Area is an extensive area with a number of buildings grouped around the large Recreation Grounds. Lewis House, McDonnell House, Noble House, Osler House and Pearce House are all located along Barrett Drive to the west of the cricket oval. Fleming House, Gladstone House, Jenner House, Kelsey House and a former male bathroom are all located at the southern end of the oval.

Fleming House (1898) is a two-storeyed building located at the southeastern corner of the cricket oval, amongst lawns and mature trees. It is constructed of light-coloured brick with narrow bands of red bricks at sill level on both floors and at the upper floor-line. It has a hipped roof with boxed-in eaves and decorative timber brackets. A detached bathroom building (1920) is centrally located on the southern elevation; it has a pyramid roof with a raised central roof lantern and a lean-to addition at the rear with a brick chimney. There is a verandah on the ground floor on the northern side, overlooking the cricket oval. A centrally located metal staircase dominates this elevation of the building. Narrow casement windows with concrete sills and lintels are found on all elevations.

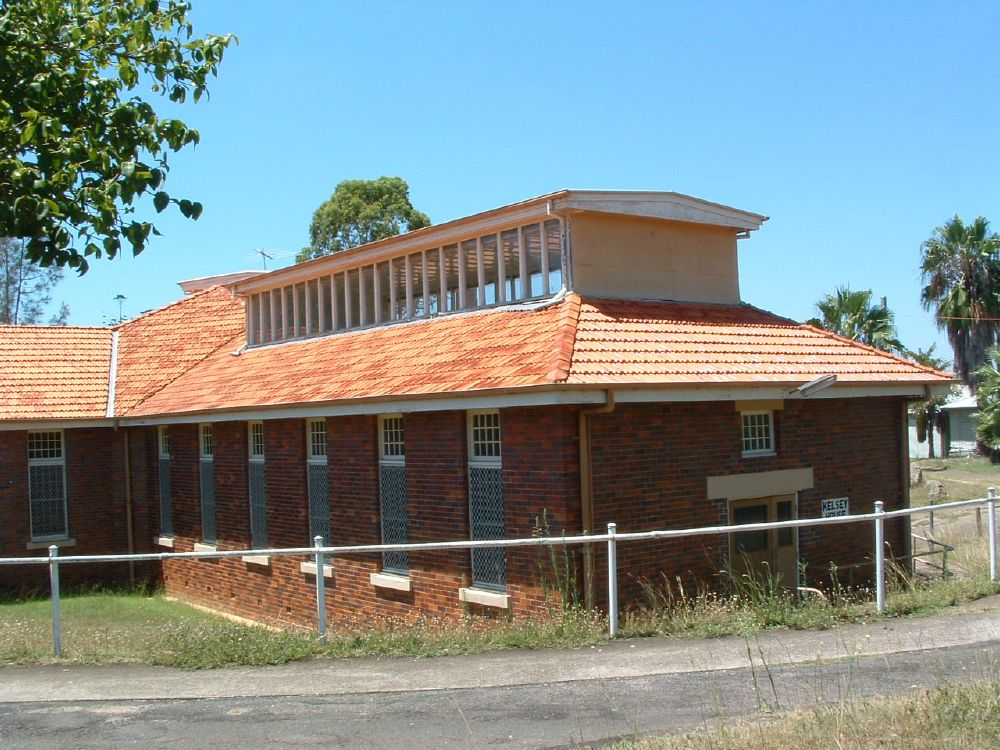
Kelsey House, 2001

Gladstone House, Jenner House and Kelsey House (all 1936) are located to the east of Fleming House and are nearly identical in form, scale and detail. Like Fleming House, these buildings are situated to overlook the cricket oval. The buildings are all single-storeyed brick buildings with unusual crab-like plan-forms, set within gardens enclosed with low wire fences. The gardens are mostly lawn with mature trees such as Poincianas. The central portion of each building comprises a large dining/day room with service facilities such as kitchens and bathrooms to the rear. The four wings of each building contain dormitories and single rooms. Each of the dining rooms has a large roof lantern with fixed glass panels that allow natural light to penetrate the room. Each of the buildings has terracotta tiled roofs and large casement windows which have aluminium security screens fitted on the outside.

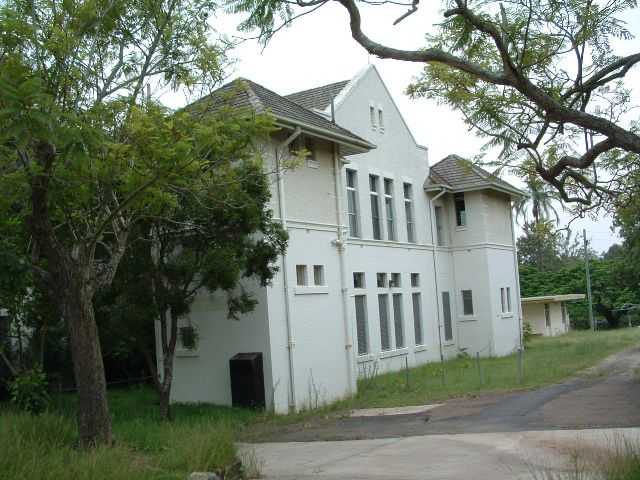
Noble House, 2004

Lewis House, McDonnell House and Noble House (all 1915) are ward buildings of similar design, located along Barrett Drive. On the eastern side the buildings overlook lawns and the cricket oval. A service road runs along the western side and the surroundings of the buildings are paved in concrete with a raised garden strip containing mature trees between the buildings and Barrett Drive. Lewis House is situated between Kelsey House and McDonnell House and is a substantial two-storeyed rendered masonry building with a terracotta-tiled roof. It has gabled roofs with parapetted gable ends and subtle quoins on the upper floor. The southern elevation has a projecting wing with pyramid-roofed pavilions at each corner and small square windows. The rest of the building has large casement windows throughout and is smooth rendered to sill height on the second floor and roughcast above. A short verandah with vertical timber louvres is located on the ground floor of the eastern elevation. McDonnell House is situated between Lewis House and Noble House. It is also two-storeyed and constructed of masonry but is more rectangular in plan with three short wings projecting on the western elevation. It has a large gabled roof and gabled roofs on the western wings, all of which have overhanging eaves. The roof is clad in dark concrete tiles and the building is rendered smooth up to sill height on the second floor, above which it is roughcast. There are two ground floor verandahs on the eastern elevation overlooking the cricket oval, either side of a central projecting gable. Noble House is almost identical to Lewis House but a concrete tiled roof has replaced the terracotta roof and it has a longer verandah on the ground floor on the eastern elevation.

Osler House (1928) and Pearce House (1934) are one-storeyed ward buildings and are virtually identical in design. They are located adjacent to Noble House, at the northern end of Barrett Drive. The buildings are brick with terracotta-tiled gabled roofs. The eastern part of each building is an elongated U-shape in plan, with two substantial rear wings running at right angles to the U. The eastern elevations have ground floor verandahs which have sheet steel barriers erected along the roofs to prevent patients from climbing onto them. Roof lanterns are located above the central hallway of the rear wings and are visible from the outside of the building although they are closed-in by recent false ceilings in the interior. The gardens are enclosed by tall wire security fences.

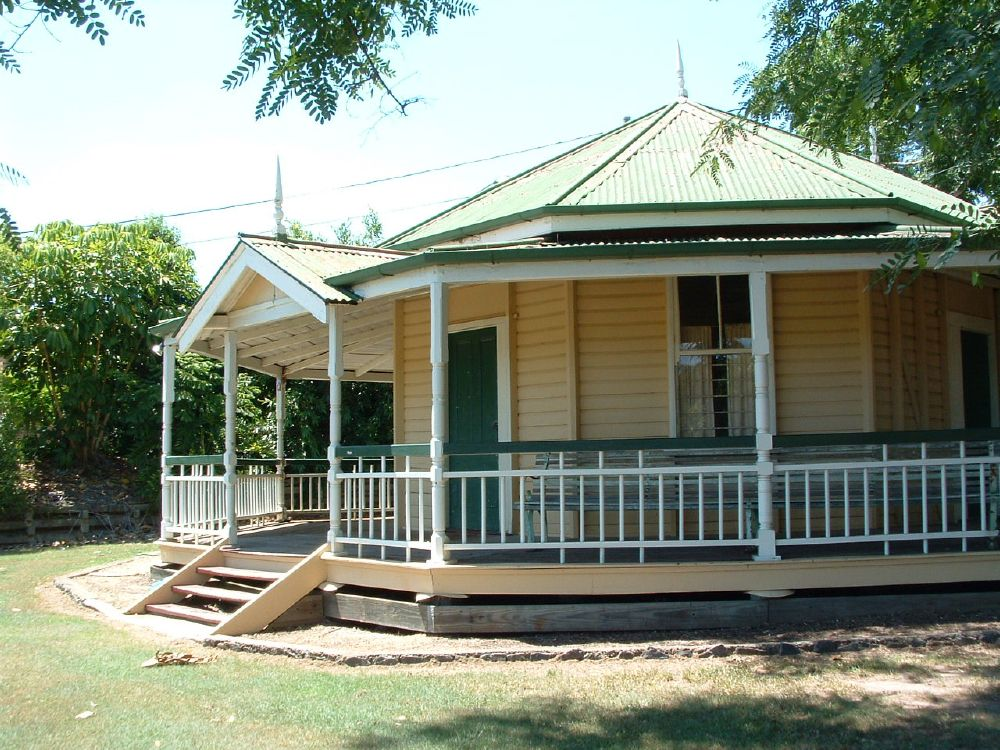
Cricket Pavilion, 2001

The Recreation Grounds is a large expanse of open space, around which the buildings of the male section are grouped. The cricket oval (1895) is the focus of this area. It is a large grassed oval with terraced edges planted with mature trees and lawn. Tennis courts, bowling green (1951), bowling green clubhouse (1968) and plant nursery (original bush house established 1911) are located at the northern end. The Cricket Pavilion (1910) is located at the southern corner of the cricket oval. It is a small hexagonal building with a rectangular wing with gabled roof located at the back. A small timber toilet block is located at the rear of the building. The hexagonal section is surrounded by a verandah with turned timber posts and dowel balustrade. It is of single-skin timber construction with timber chamferboards and exposed bracing. The roof has decorative finials and a small gable is located above the short entry stair.

=== Female Area ===
The Female Area comprises Female Wards 1&2, Anderson House, Bostock House, Dawson House and a former female bathroom.

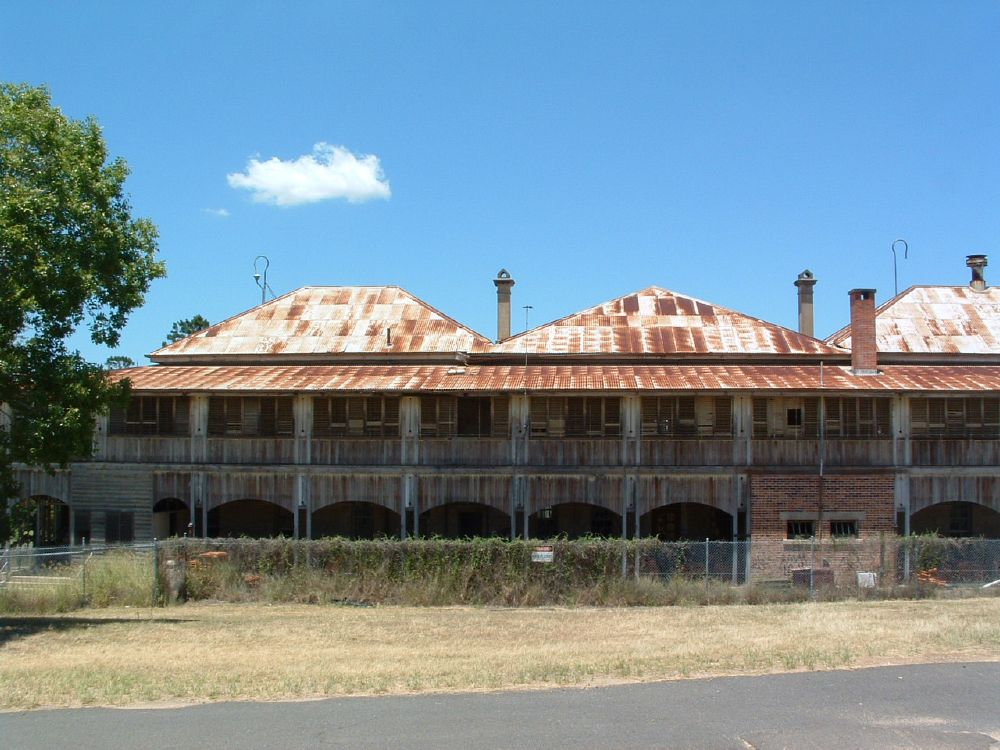
Female wards 1 & 2, 2001

Female Wards 1&2 (1866) is a large, two-storeyed timber and masonry building located on a ridge between Ellerton Drive and the Brisbane River. The core of the building is sandstone with a number of large timber and brick additions. The sandstone core is long and rectangular in plan with a projecting two-storeyed bay with timber verandahs on the south elevation. Two elevated brick pavilions (bathhouses) with raised roof lanterns, concrete floors and supporting posts are located either side of the projecting bay. Three-storeyed brick additions are located at each end of the building. These have corrugated iron roofs with small roof lanterns and regularly spaced sash windows. The main section of the building has three separate roofs, all corrugated iron. The largest is a hipped roof at the northwestern end; the central roof is a pyramid; and the southeastern roof is a smaller hip. A wide timber verandah with a skillion roof runs the length of the north elevation at both levels and returns around at both the eastern and western ends of the building. It is enclosed with timber shutters on the top storey and has an arched timber valance and timber posts at ground level. Sections of the verandah at the western and eastern ends have been enclosed with timber weatherboards. The sandstone part of the building has narrow, multi-paned sash windows and timber doors with fanlights. The interior of the building is gutted and only the timber floor joists and cast iron columns remain. A small Shelter Shed (1929) is located to the south of Female Wards 1&2 and was used to separate troublesome patients from the main wards. It is a brick structure with a concrete floor and fireplace and a gabled corrugated iron roof. A tall timber picket fence encloses the yard adjacent to the shed.

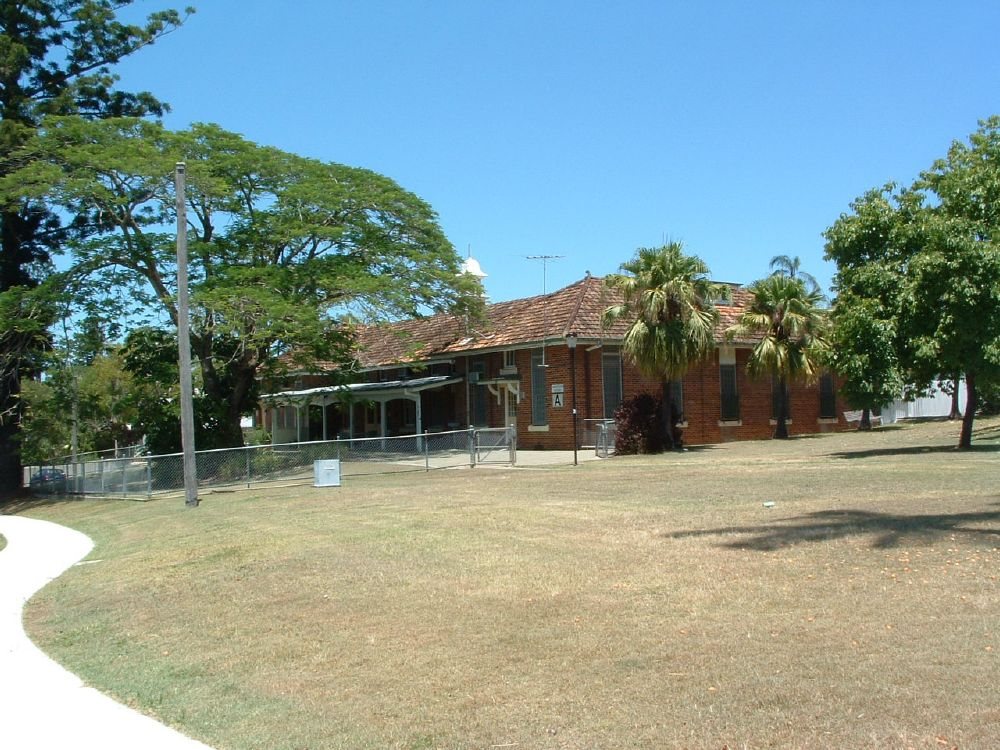
Anderson House, 2001

Anderson House (1917) is located on Ellerton Drive, northeast of Female Wards 1&2. It is a single-storeyed, brick building with a hipped terracotta-tiled roof and a decorative fleche. The building is domestic in scale. It has a timber verandah with a skillion roof along the front elevation and has tall sash windows throughout. Its front garden is enclosed with a short wire fence and is dominated by a large spreading Poinciana tree. A small timber residence is located to the south of Anderson House. It is clad in weatherboards with a painted, corrugated steel roof. The front (eastern) elevation has a single gable roof and a small verandah.

Bostock House (1885) is located to the north of Anderson House and is also orientated to face Ellerton Drive, although it is set back within extensive lawns. It is a substantial two-storeyed building of polychromatic brickwork, with a projecting bay topped by a gabled roof on the north elevation, with ground floor verandahs located to either side. A circular window is located in the gable end. The main hipped roof and subsidiary roofs are all clad in corrugated iron. At the northern end of the building are two, single-storeyed attached pavilions; one is five-sided like a large bay window, the second is square with a pyramid roof. The southern end has a single-storeyed extension with roof lanterns. A two-storeyed timber, enclosed verandah with skillion roof is located at the rear of the building.

Dawson House (1944) is a sizeable brick building of two storeys with a basement, located on a sloping site behind Bostock House. The building is orientated to the north and is H-shaped in plan. The basement level is rendered and painted, while the rest of the building is dark face brickwork, harmonious with other brick buildings on the site. It has rendered strips painted cream which wrap around the building at the height of window sills and heads. The facade is symmetrical with pared-back classical architectural detailing around entry doors and some sets of windows. Each floor of the building has long central hallways with rooms of various sizes to either side. The building has two interior staircases, a lift and an external concrete fire escape stair. Windows throughout the building are multi-paned sash windows with painted cast iron security grills at low level.

A small brick building with a hipped roof is located between Dawson House and the Recreation Hall, which was originally built as a female bathroom (1902) but is now known as Dawson House Annex.

=== Female Recreation Area ===
The former female recreation area is situated in the western corner of the site. The area is bounded by Woogaroo Creek to the south and the Brisbane River to the north and is visually separated from the main hospital complex by bushland and mature plantings. Most of the area is now part of Wolston Park Golf Course. The major building in the area is the cafeteria (1955, now golf clubhouse), a low-set brick building with a hipped roof and brick chimney. It overlooks the grounds and the river and has a lightweight steel roof over a terrace on the north elevation. A bowling green, shelter shed and tennis court are located to the north of the building.

=== Wacol Repatriation Pavilion ===
The Wacol Repatriation Pavilion comprises Wards A, B and C, Kitchen Block, Recreation Hall and Recreation Grounds and is located between Barrett Drive and Wolston Park Road.

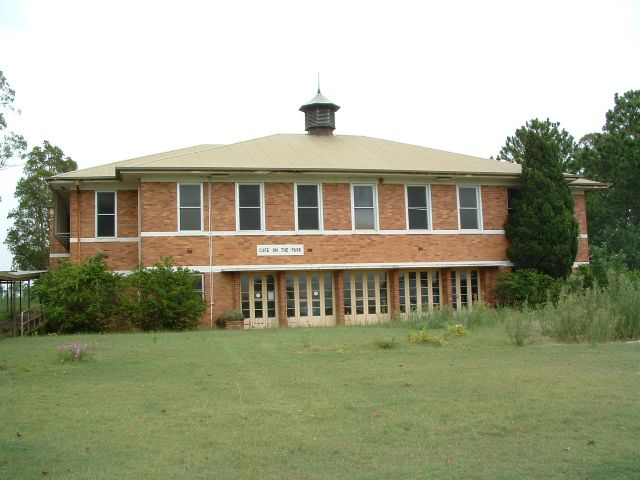
Kitchen block, 2004

Wards A and B (1948) are two similar U-shaped blocks that back onto Wolston Park Road. They are constructed of cream brick with hipped, corrugated colourbond steel roofs with boxed eaves. The wings of the buildings enclose grassy courtyards, which are surrounded by verandahs. The Kitchen Block (1948) is located in the middle of the Wacol Repatriation Pavilion complex, between Wards A and B. It is two-storeyed and is constructed of the same cream brick with corrugated colourbond steel roof with fleche. It has an open-fronted canteen at the front of the building (facing northeast), opening via folding timber doors onto a terraced lawn area. The rear of the building is accessed by a service driveway from Wolston Park Road. Ward C (1948) is H-shaped in plan and is also constructed of cream brick with a hipped, corrugated colourbond steel roof. It is located at the end of Barrett Drive and has a roofed terrace on the northwest elevation. The Recreation Hall is located to the north of Ward C. The grounds consist of a mix of evenly sloped lawns with trees randomly planted between the buildings. Clumps of Oleander bushes are formally spaced along both sides of the lower entry drive. A cricket oval (1954–5) is located to the southeast of the complex. The cricket oval has a white painted picket perimeter fence and a timber sight-screen.

=== Wacol Rehabilitation Area ===
The former Wacol Rehabilitation Area (now used by the Department of Corrective Services) is located in the northernmost portion of the site and comprises physically separate male and female sections, with the male section occupying former Farm Ward buildings. These consist of Quarter Way House, Farm Ward and Farm Sheds.

Quarter Way House (1918) is a timber residence erected for the farm overseer. It has a front verandah and rooms are accessed from a central hallway. The former Farm Ward (1916) is a largely timber building with a central core of brick that includes a brick fireplace. It has a small brick ablutions block at the southwest corner. The verandahs are enclosed with glass louvres and the interior is lined with Masonite. Two Farm Sheds (1916) are located across a road to the north of the former ward. They are timber-framed and clad in corrugated galvanized iron.

=== Basil Stafford Centre ===
The Basil Stafford Centre is located in the northern portion of the site and comprises the former Farm Ward Block, a school building and villa-style accommodation.

The former Farm Ward Block (1957) is a one and two storeyed, brown brick building with four distinct sections. Ward A occupies the single-storeyed section and Ward B is partly two-storey. The central part of the building contains the service areas. The building has hipped corrugated fibre-cement roofs and high level, multi-paned sash windows throughout. The grounds of the building are landscaped with open terraces paved with stone from the hospital quarry. A concrete water tower is prominently located at the crest of the hill, adjacent to the former Farm Ward building.

=== Nyunda Park/Riverbank area ===
This area comprises a mix of open and enclosed bushland, a dam, picnic facilities adjacent to the dam, the John Oxley Centre and remnants of a sandstone quarry.

The John Oxley Centre (1990) is a low-set one-storeyed building clad in fibre-cement with a corrugated steel roof. The building is vacant and is surrounded by tall wire fences. Nyunda Park is an unused area of bushland with a large dam. There are two former sandstone quarry sites in this area, one of which is partly submerged by the dam. The second is adjacent to the riverbank and evidence of workings remain.

=== The Grounds ===
Two golf courses form the perimeter of the hospital complex along the southern and eastern edges. The Gailes Golf Course extends around the hillside between Wilruna Street and the railway line, the recent high security development at the eastern side of the site and the Wacol Repatriation Pavilion. The Wolston Park Golf Course is situated on the gently sloping hillside south of the Central Administration area and includes the land cleared between Woogaroo Creek and the female recreation area. The golf courses maintain the spacious, natural and open landscape setting of the complex. The site of the 1860s graveyard associated with the establishment of Woogaroo Asylum is located at the far western end of what Wolston Park Golf Course, and is a site of potential archaeological interest.

The rest of the grounds consist of a mix of open space areas with extensive lawns, clumps of scrub and numbers of mature trees. Formal gardens are found in the immediate environs of many of the buildings. Ellerton Drive is the formal road through the grounds from the Goodna entrance to the site and is flanked by an avenue of trees. The lower portion of the drive is lined with elms (Celtis sinensis), the middle portion alongside the reservoir is lined with hoop pines and bunya pines and the top end of the drive is planted with large pines. The road has sandstone kerbing.

== Facilities ==
The hospital currently can accommodate 192 patients through five clinical treatment and rehabilitation programs:

- 51 beds for people needing extended inpatient treatment and rehabilitation;
- 31 beds for people with a mental disorder who are also intellectually disabled;
- 34 beds for people requiring medium security inpatient care;
- 61 beds for people needing high security inpatient care;
- a 15-bed adolescent rehabilitation unit

The hospital does not provide emergency medical services, the closest general hospital is the Ipswich Hospital.

== Heritage listing ==
Wolston Park Hospital Complex was listed on the Queensland Heritage Register on 21 October 1992 having satisfied the following criteria.

The place is important in demonstrating the evolution or pattern of Queensland's history.

As the earliest and best-known public institution providing care and treatment for mentally ill and intellectually disabled people in Queensland, Wolston Park Hospital Complex is important in demonstrating the evolution of Queensland's history. The Woogaroo Asylum was founded by the Queensland government as the first publicly funded, mental health institution in the colony in the early 1860s and by the 1950s became the largest such institution not only in Queensland, but in Australia. The provision of health and welfare services was regarded as the responsibility of charitable and religious organizations in the 19th century; the care and treatment of mental illness was the one exception, thus the Wolston Park Hospital Complex demonstrates the role of the state in the care of mentally ill people since the 1860s. It demonstrates the changing practices in the treatment of mental illness: from a 19th-century asylum founded on confinement and separation, through moral treatment or therapy from 1909 to the 1930s, the drug and medical therapies of the 1940s (Mental Hygiene) and 1960s (Psychiatric Services) to the trend towards deinstitutionalization and community-based services by the 1980s. The physical evolution of the site highlights these changes as the complex has developed incrementally across the substantial 450hectare reserve, rather than intensively in layers in one area. The site is also significant in demonstrating the development of specialist mental health services for returned service personnel and intellectually disabled people.

The place has potential to yield information that will contribute to an understanding of Queensland's history.

The site of an early graveyard at the western end of what is now the Wolston Park Golf Course, near the confluence of Woogaroo Creek and the Brisbane River and associated with the first asylum buildings on the reserve, is an area of archeological interest with potential to yield information that will contribute to an understanding of Queensland's history.

The place is important in demonstrating the principal characteristics of a particular class of cultural places.

Wolston Park Hospital Complex demonstrates the principal characteristics and evolution of a major public health institution. The expansive grounds and distinctive groups of buildings at the complex evoke a strong sense of place. The self-contained nature of the place is reflected in the range of buildings and facilities on the site including ward accommodation, health and hospital facilities, administration buildings, staff quarters, recreation facilities, chapels and service buildings such as kitchens, laundries and a powerhouse. The grounds and landscaping are also important elements with recreation and agricultural facilities demonstrating the role of useful employment and recreation in the hospital's operations. The relationships between the buildings and other site elements are fundamental to our understanding of the functioning of the place as a mental health institution since the 1860s.

A substantial number of buildings, structures and grounds elements survive from each major phase in the development of the institution.

Significant 19th century elements include Female Wards 1&2 (1866), Bostock House (1885), the Recreation Hall (1890), Fleming House (1898), the former Medical Superintendent's Residence (1898) and the recreation ground (1895, redeveloped into cricket oval in 1910). The remnants of a sandstone quarry along the riverbank dates from the 1860s and was one of the first sandstone quarries developed in Queensland.

Early 20th century elements include the three male blocks Lewis House (1915), Noble House (1915) and McDonnell House (1915), former male and female bathroom blocks (1902), the female ward Anderson House (1917), the former hospital ward block (1917), the Administration Building (1917) and the assistant Medical Superintendent's residence (1912); service facilities such as the morgue (1902), the reservoir (1914), pump house (1914), powerhouse (1917) and laundry (1918) and recreation facilities such as the cricket oval (1910) and the Cricket Pavilion (1910). Significant elements of the former farm ward complex include the Farm Ward (1916), two farm sheds (1916) and Quarter Way House (1918).

Important elements from the capital works program of the 1920s and 30s include the Visitor's Pavilion (1920), Osler House (1929), the shelter shed at the rear of Female Wards 1&2 (1929), Pearce House (1934), Kelsey House (1936), Gladstone House (1936), Jenner House (1936) and the Gailes Golf Course (1922–25).

Postwar elements include Dawson House (1944), the Female Recreation Area encompassing the cafeteria (1955), workroom (1950) and shelter sheds (1955). The remaining chapel (1961) demonstrates the provision of religious services and chaplaincy at the complex. Significant elements of the Wacol Repatriation Pavilion established post World War Two include Ward A (1948), Ward B (1948), Ward C (1948), kitchen and canteen (1948), and Recreation Hall (1950). The former Farm Ward Block (1957), now part of the Basil Stafford Centre, is also important.

The place is important because of its aesthetic significance.

The Wolston Park Hospital Complex is important because of its aesthetic significance, which derives from the massing, architectural form and detailing of the buildings, the relationships between the buildings and the interplay between the buildings and the landscape and grounds.

The aesthetic impact of the complex is heightened by its location on the top of a hill and its setting within extensive grounds that have a distinctive, natural landscape character. The complex includes a range of architectural styles and forms; from modest timber visitor pavilions through to imposing brick ward and administration buildings. Care in the design of hospital buildings and grounds reflects efforts to mitigate the stigma attached to mental illness, while at the same time the substantial and formal character of many of the buildings demonstrates strong State control and regulation of mentally ill people in Queensland.

The place has a strong or special association with a particular community or cultural group for social, cultural or spiritual reasons.

The Wolston Park Hospital Complex is the longest-operating mental health facility in the State. A culture has developed around the institution, establishing an association with the Queensland mental health community, including staff, patients, families, friends, and advocates, both past and present. The complex is associated with the treatment of mental illness within the Queensland community.

== Notable residents ==
Notable residents include:

- Frederick William Everest, double murderer
- Alexandre Arsène Girault, entomologist
- John Henry Nicholson, teacher and writer
- Eddie Gilbert, cricketer
- Raina Thaiday, perpetrator of the 2014 Cairns child killings

== See also ==
- List of hospitals in Australia
