= International Journal of Slavic Linguistics and Poetics =

Slavistics journal (1959–2006)

- Discipline: Slavic philology
- Language: English, French, German, Polish, Russian
- Edited by: Dean Stoddard Worth

Publication details
- History: 1959-2006
- Publisher: Mouton, Peter de Ridder Press, Slavica Publishers
- Frequency: Continuous

Standard abbreviations
- ISO 4: Int. J. Slav. Linguist. Poet.

Indexing
- ISSN: 0538-8228 (print); 1542-4294 (web)
- LCCN: 61036096
- OCLC no.: 1753591

The International Journal of Slavic Linguistics and Poetics, often referred to by its initialism IJSLP, (Note: Not to be confused with the International Journal of Speech-Language Pathology, which shares the same initialism (IJSLP).) was an annual illustrated journal of Slavic philology published between 1959 and 2006 by various publishers - Mouton (The Hague, 1959 and 2002/2003), Peter de Ridder Press (Lisse, 1975-1976), Slavica Publishers (Columbus, Ohio, 1981-1997, and Bloomington, Indiana, 1998-2003). It is one of the "representative publications in Slavic linguistics" in North America.

== Languages of publication ==
The articles were published in English, French, German, Polish, and Russian. The system developed for the Romanization of Russian in the journal employed Czech diacritics.

== Scope and indexing ==
The concept behind the name is defined in Roman Jakobson's paper, Linguistics and Poetics, printed as a chapter in MIT Press' Style in Language in 1960. The paper was reprinted in Poetry of Grammar and Grammar of Poetry 3 in 1981. The journal carried on the tradition of Jakobsonian structuralism and philology even after his death, but "by no means in a doctrinaire way". It was similar in scope to the more eclectic Folia Slavica, which it would ultimately outcompete along with Russian Linguistics.

It was a specialist publication for Slavic linguists, topics ranging from problems editing early manuscripts to textual criticism of contemporary literature. Languages studied dialectologically included Common Slavic, Late Common Slavic, Slovene, Polish, Ukrainian, Macedonian, Upper Sorbian, and Serbo-Croatian. Languages studied textually included Old Church Slavonic and Russian. The journal was consistently oriented towards historical linguistics. A total of 83 articles appeared in the last 6 volumes, whose contents were analysed by Nedashkivska 2015, who noted 69% of articles focused on linguistics, in addition to 25% on historical linguistics, 18% on syntax, 5% each on morphology, semantics and pragmatics, with only 2 articles each on phonetics and phonology, lexis, comparative linguistics and dialectology, and 1 on second-language acquisition.

It was abstracted and indexed the Bavarian State Library's New Contents Slavistics (German: Inhaltsverzeichnisse slavistischer Zeitschriften) and indexed in its successor Slavistik-Portal, It was also abstracted and indexed by Cambridge's Linguistics and Language Behavior Abstracts (LLBA). It is one of the Core Journals indexed by the University of Illinois Urbana-Champaign's American Bibliography of Slavic and East European Studies (ABSEES). It is also indexed in Linguistic Bibliography and the MLA Directory of Periodicals.

== History ==
The journal was established in 1958 by Roman Jakobson, Francis J. Whitfield, and Cornelis Hendrik van Schooneveld with the financial assistance of the Harvard University's Committee for the Promotion of Advanced Slavic Cultural Studies. (Note: Informally known as the PROM Committee.) The journal saw "a variety of contributors and theoretical approaches". Alongside Edward Stankiewicz and Christian Stang, Dean Stoddard Worth joined as editor early on, and reained its editor through the last volume. Walter N. Vickery was also an editor at one point. Jakobson has been described as the "moving spirit" behind the journal.

Founded three years after the last volume of Slavic Word and two years after the establishment of the Slavic and East European Journal (SEEJ), the IJSLP was both in chronology and editorial board composition a successor of Slavic Word quickly became a "major forum" for American Slavic linguists, coexisting with the SEEJ. For the first decade, it was an annual publication and one of the dominant journals in American Slavistics, but gradually it fell off in favour of other journals.

Jakobson's personal involvement in the journal's content curation was sometimes a matter of contention. In 1969, when Michael Shapiro published a negative review in Language of a book by one of Jakobson's Harvard students, Jakobson published the student's rebuttal in IJSLP, telephoned to convince the dean of Shapiro's UCLA college to turn him down for tenure when it came up in 1970, and initially refused to publish his counter-rebuttal in the IJSLP. Dean Worth threatened to resign as Managing Editor if it was not published, so Jakobson backed down.

In 1982, it was the oldest of 6 Slavic studies periodicals published in the Netherlands. The volume that year was published as a Festschrift dedicated to Edward Stankiewicz. Upon the death of Jakobson in 1982, a special memorial volume titled Roman Jakobson: What He Taught Us was published as a supplement to volume 27. The 1985 volume was also published as a Festschrift, dedicated to Henrik Birnbaum.

Later on, major irregularities in its publication schedule arose, including a 7 year gap between the 1988 volume and its publication in 1995. The last volume to require physical typesetting was 39–40, published in 1996. After its publication was discontinued, many of its contributors shifted to the Journal of Slavic Linguistics (ISSN 1543-0391).

Some papers published in early issues are still cited today. Some of these are listed in Bethin 2006.

== See also ==
- List of Slavic studies journals

== Bibliography ==
Alphabetically, by author or publisher:

- Brill (n.d.). "Linguistic Bibliography Online". Brill Bibliographies.
- BSB (n.d.). "International journal of Slavic linguistics and poetics". Slavistik-Portal.
- HT (n.d.). "Catalog Record: International Journal of Slavic Linguistics and Poetics". HathiTrust.
- MLA (n.d.). "MLA Directory of Periodicals". Modern Language Association.
- NULBC (n.d.). "Boston Catalogs + Articles". Northeastern University Library, Boston Campus, Scholar OneSearch.
- UIUC (n.d.). "ABSEES Core Journals". Archived from the original on 2024-07-23.
- Andersen, Henning (2016-12-01). "Dean S. Worth In Memoriam". Journal of Slavic Linguistics. 24 (2): 269–271.
- Baran, Henryk (2021-08-11). "Roman Jakobson and American Slavic Studies: The First Postwar Decade". Roczniki Humanistyczne. 69 (7): 91–116. doi:10.18290/RH21697-7. eISSN 2544-5200.
- Bethin, Christina Y. (2006). "Slavic Phonology in the United States" (PDF). Glossos Journal of Slavic Linguistics (8): 1–39.
- Gribble, Charles E. (1995). "Scholarly Publishers in Slavic Linguistics, or Why I Would Rather See than Be One". Journal of Slavic Linguistics. 3 (2): 221–238. ISSN 1068-2090. JSTOR 24598949.
- Halle, Morris, ed. (1983). Roman Jakobson: What He Taught Us. Columbus: Slavica Publishers. ISBN 0-89357-118-0.
- Jakobson, Roman (1960). "Linguistics and Poetics" (PDF). Style in Language. Cambridge: Massachusetts Institute of Technology Press. pp. 350–377.
- Jakobson, Roman (1981). "Linguistics and Poetics". Poetry of Grammar and Grammar of Poetry. Vol. 3. pp. 18–51. ISBN 9789027931788.
- Jakobson, Roman (1997) [1992]. Jangfeldt, Bengt; Rudy, Stephen (eds.). My Futurist Years. Translated by Rudy, Stephen. New York: Marsilio Publishers. ISBN 0-941419-79-7.
- Keller, Howard H. (1983). "New Contents Slavistics: A Journal Indexing Service". The Slavic and East European Journal. 27 (3): 374–378. doi:10.2307/307864. ISSN 0037-6752.
- Kilby, David (1983). "Language". The Year's Work in Modern Language Studies. 45: 916–923. ISSN 0084-4152. JSTOR 20868029.
- Kopper, John (2006). "Out from under Siege: The First Volume of "SEEJ" and the Professionalization of Slavic Studies in the United States". The Slavic and East European Journal. 50 (1): 12–28. doi:10.2307/20459231. ISSN 0037-6752. JSTOR 20459231.
- Lunt, Horace Gray (1982). "Roman Jakobson, 1896–1982" (PDF). Slavic Review. 41 (4): 776–777. doi:10.1017/S0037677900066183. ISSN 0037-6779.
- Nedashkivska, Alla (2015-04-14). "The Metropolis of Slavic Linguistics in North America and Its Development Over the Past Two Decades". Canadian Slavonic Papers. 53 (2–4): 485–511. doi:10.1080/00085006.2011.11092686. eISSN 2375-2475.
- Rappaport, Gilbert C. (2006). "Slavic and East European Linguistics in "SEEJ": A Half-Century of Scholarship". The Slavic and East European Journal. 50 (1): 97–116. doi:10.2307/20459236. ISSN 0037-6752. JSTOR 20459236.
- Shapiro, Michael (2018-02-17). "Roman Jakobson in Retrospect: Unvarnished remembrances of a stiff-necked student". Chinese Semiotic Studies. 14 (1): 41–56. doi:10.1515/css-2018-0003. eISSN 2198-9613.
- Townsend, Thomas (1987). "Windows on the East: A Selective List of Current English-Language Serials on the Soviet Union". Serials Review. 13 (1): 37–41. doi:10.1080/00987913.1987.10763727. ISSN 0098-7913.
- Tripiccione, Lidia (2024-04-18). "Cold War Networks and the Scholarly Byt: How Russian Formalism Became an American Thing". Slavic Review. 82 (4): 949–970. doi:10.1017/slr.2024.3. eISSN 2325-7784.
