= Gail Gillon =

New Zealand child development researcher

Gail Therese Gillon
- Education: University of Queensland
- Scientific career
- Fields: Child development
- Workplaces: University of Canterbury
- Thesis: The phonological, semantic and syntactic skills of children with specific reading disability (1995)
- Doctoral students: Catherine Moran

Gail Therese Gillon is a New Zealand child development academic. She is currently a full professor at the University of Canterbury and is a Fellow of the Royal Society Te Apārangi.

== Academic career ==
After a 1995 PhD at titled 'The phonological, semantic and syntactic skills of children with specific reading disability' at the University of Queensland, she moved to the University of Canterbury, rising to full professor.

Much of Gillon's research relates to phonological awareness intervention in childhood reading disorders.

Notable doctoral students of Gillon include Catherine Moran.

== Awards ==
In March 2021, Gillon was made a Fellow of the Royal Society Te Apārangi, recognising that her research "has resulted in transformation of both speech-language therapy and class teaching practices throughout the world... and is positively enhancing the well-being of thousands of children and their whānau in Aotearoa New Zealand."

== Selected works ==
- Gillon, Gail T. Phonological awareness: From research to practice. Guilford Publications, 2017.
- Gillon, Gail T. "The efficacy of phonological awareness intervention for children with spoken language impairment." Language, Speech, and Hearing Services in Schools 31, no. 2 (2000): 126–141.
- Gillon, Gail T. "Facilitating phoneme awareness development in 3-and 4-year-old children with speech impairment." Language, Speech, and Hearing Services in Schools 36, no. 4 (2005): 308–324.
- Gillon, Gail T. "Follow‐up study investigating the benefits of phonological awareness intervention for children with spoken language impairment." International Journal of Language & Communication Disorders 37, no. 4 (2002): 381–400.
- Sutherland, Dean, and Gail T. Gillon. "Assessment of phonological representations in children with speech impairment." Language, speech, and hearing services in schools 36, no. 4 (2005): 294–307.
- van Bysterveldt, Anne K., Gail T. Gillon, and Catherine Moran. "Enhancing phonological awareness and letter knowledge in preschool children with Down syndrome." International Journal of Disability, Development and Education 53, no. 3 (2006): 301–329.
