= International Journal of Speech-Language Pathology =

- Discipline: Speech and language pathology
- Language: English
- Edited by: Sharynne McLeod

Publication details
- History: 1999-present
- Publisher: Informa
- Frequency: Bimonthly

Standard abbreviations
- ISO 4: Int. J. Speech-Lang. Pathol.

Indexing
- ISSN: 1754-9507 (print); 1754-9515 (web)

Links
- Journal homepage

The International Journal of Speech-Language Pathology (Note: Not to be confused with the International Journal of Slavic Linguistics and Poetics, which shares the same initialism (IJSLP).) is a bimonthly peer-reviewed medical journal published by Speech Pathology Australia that covers any area of child or adult communication or dysphagia and issues related to etiology, assessment, diagnosis, intervention, or theoretical frameworks. A scientific forum is included in many issues, where a topic is debated by invited experts. The journal is edited by Sharynne McLeod (Charles Sturt University) and has been published since 1999.
