= Brain Injury (journal) =

- Discipline: Neurology
- Language: English
- Edited by: Nathan D. Zasler

Publication details
- History: 1987–present
- Publisher: Taylor & Francis
- Frequency: 14/year
- Impact factor: 1.69 (2019)

Standard abbreviations
- ISO 4: Brain Inj.

Indexing
- CODEN: BRAIEO
- ISSN: 0269-9052 (print); 1362-301X (web)
- LCCN: 88659556
- OCLC no.: 12055327

Links
- Journal homepage; Online access; Online archive

Brain Injury is a monthly, peer-reviewed, medical journal published by Taylor & Francis. Furthermore, it is the official journal of the International Brain Injury Association (IBIA). As of April 2024, the editor-in-chief is Nathan Zasler (University of Virginia).

== History ==
This journal was published quarterly, beginning in July, 1987 to 1995. From 1996 to at least 2003 it was published monthly. The current frequency of publication is 14 times per year.

This journal covers all topics of research and clinical practice, pertaining to brain damage in adult and pediatric populations. More specifically, the range of coverage includes fundamental research, clinical studies, brain injury translational medicine, as well as emergency room practices, acute medical delivery, rehabilitation through various phases, family issues, vocational concerns, and long-term support. Disorders that are psychological, functional, communicative, or neurological are covered from the perspective of assessment and intervention.

== Abstracting and indexing ==
This journal is indexed in the databases, including:

- BIOSIS previews
- CSA Linguistics & Language Behavior Abstracts
- CINAHL
- Current Contents / Clinical Medicine
- EBSCO
- Excerpta Medica / EMBASE
- Index Medicus / MEDLINE
- Neuroscience Citation Index
- PsycINFO
- Research Alert
- Science Citation Index
- Scopus
- Sociological Abstracts

According to Ulrich's Periodicals Directory, it is indexed in Scopus, MEDLINE, PubMed, Biological Abstracts, PsycINFO, and other indexing and abstracting services. According to the 2010 Journal Citation Reports the 2014 impact factor is 1.808, and the ranking for this journal is 181 of 230 in the Neurosciences.
