= Encyclopedia of Hebrew Language and Linguistics =

The Encyclopedia of Hebrew Language and Linguistics (EHLL) is a specialized encyclopedia focusing on the Hebrew language published by Brill Publishers in 2013.

It comprehensively presents linguistic, historical, literary, and cultural aspects of all periods of Hebrew (Biblical, Rabbinic, Medieval, and Modern). The compilers' goals were to bring together the varied research on different periods of Hebrew and to bring study of Hebrew into line with the modern general linguistics.

The encyclopedic articles focus more on topics than on specific personalities from the language's history. For example, it doesn't have specific articles about Saadia Gaon, Aaron ben Moses ben Asher, or Eliezer Ben-Yehuda, but it does have articles about their works: Aleppo Codex, Comparative Linguistics in the Medieval Hebrew Grammatical Tradition, and Revival of Hebrew.

The encyclopedia has more than 900 articles written by almost 400 contributors, among them David M. Bunis, Anne Castles, Zipora Cochavi-Rainey, Peter T. Daniels, Edit Doron, Holger Gzella, Ruth A. Berman, Yehoshua Blau, Sarah Bunin Benor, Aaron Koller, Irit Meir, Takamitsu Muraoka, Anat Ninio, Marc van Oostendorp, Ilia Rodov, Yona Sabar, Tamar Sovran, Michal Temkin Martinez, Emanuel Tov, Shalva Weil, Andrea Weiss, Paul Wexler, and Ghil'ad Zuckermann. Its chief editor is the British Semitic languages philologist Geoffrey Khan, and its associate editors are the Israeli and American linguists Shmuel Bolozky, Steven Fassberg, Gary A. Rendsburg, Aaron D. Rubin, Ora R. Schwarzwald, and Tamar Zewi.

== Publishing ==
The Encyclopedia of Hebrew Language and Linguistics was published in English in three print volumes and an additional index volume.

The complete encyclopedia as well as several additional articles are available on the publisher's website under the title Encyclopedia of Hebrew Language and Linguistics Online.

== Reception ==
In a review for the Journal of Jewish Studies, the historian Stefan Reif praised Geoffrey Khan's editing work, described the encyclopedia's goals as "clearly stated", and the result as a "massive enterprise" with "important data" and "stimulating ideas", usable for both lay people and experts, and with a variety of topics from pop music, insults, and slang to braille, deixis, and relexification. He found the work somewhat lacking in areas of his personal interest, such as grammarians and linguists of Ashkenaz and found certain mistakes and inconsistencies, and he also mentioned that the index could be more detailed, but said that such issues are inevitable in a work as massive as this, and those are personal minor quibbles. He also noted the low coverage of the Hebrew language of prayers as a more significant issue.

Reviewing the encyclopedia for the Evangelical journal Themelios, the Bible scholar George Athas described the work as "monumental" and "significant" and noted that while the articles about Hebrew loanwords in other languages and modern Israeli culture are of little interest to Bible scholars, they exemplify the encyclopedia's scope. He also noted that some Bible-related articles had "curious" conclusions, demonstrated one-sidedness and parochialism, and were somewhat technical, but said that generally the articles are informative and detailed and that the encyclopedia is a welcome resource.

In the 2015 review for Reference Reviews, dealing especially with the online version, William Baker called the encyclopedia "user-friendly", but was somewhat disappointed that the search for "Cohen" didn't easily find information about the origin of the name, and searches for names of several notable individuals from the Jewish history didn't produce a lot of useful results specifically about them, although all those searches did show many other "fascinating" articles.

In a special 2014 session of the Academy of the Hebrew Language dedicated to the encyclopedia's release, Moshe Bar-Asher and other Hebrew linguists noted that the encyclopedia is the first of its kind in its scope and that there is no aspect of Hebrew that it didn't touch, although they expressed some dismay that such a work was not published in the Hebrew language itself.
