= Sovran (disambiguation) =

Sovran is a 2015 album by Draconian.

Sovran may also refer to:

- Sovran Bank, American bank which operated 1983–1990

== People with the surname ==
- Gino Sovran (1924–2016), Canadian basketball player
- Tamar Sovran (born 1948), Israeli linguist

== Other ==
- Sovran Citizen
- Sovran Self Storage

== See also ==
- Sovereign (disambiguation)
