= Nebuchadnezzar (governor of Uruk) =

7th-century BCE Assyrian governor of Uruk

Nebuchadnezzar (Babylonian cuneiform: Nabû-kudurri-uṣur, meaning "Nabu, watch over my heir"), also spelled Nebuchadrezzar, and most commonly known under the nickname Kudurru, was a governor of the city Uruk in Babylonia under the rule of Ashurbanipal (r. 669–631 BC) of the Neo-Assyrian Empire, appointed after the defeat of Shamash-shum-ukin of Babylon, Ashurbanipal's brother who had rebelled against Assyria, c. 648 BC. He was likely the son of the high priest Nabonassar.

In the reign of Ashurbanipal's son Sinsharishkun (r. 627–612 BC), the grave of Nebuchadnezzar was desecrated, with the perpetrators going so far as dragging his body through the streets of Uruk. This was done as a response to the anti-Assyrian activities of his two sons. In 2007, Assyriologist Michael Jursa identified Nebuchadnezzar as the father of Nabopolassar, the founder of the Neo-Babylonian Empire, who rebelled against Sinsharishkun in 626 BC (this being the anti-Assyrian activities). If Nabopolassar was his son, Nabopolassar would go on to name his own son, Nebuchadnezzar II, after his father.
