= Gary A. Rendsburg =

American professor (born 1954)

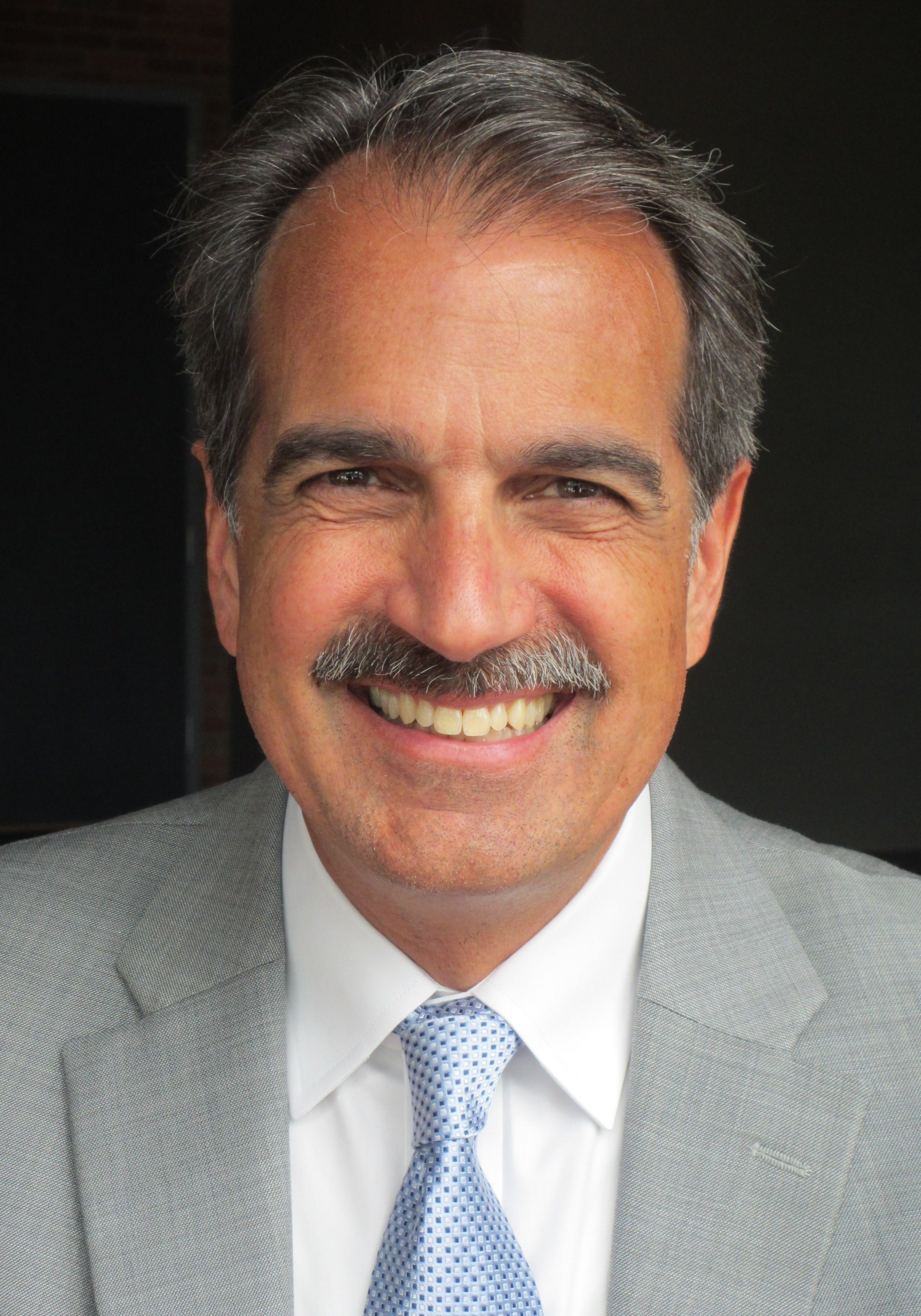
Gary A Rendsburg - September 2016

Gary A. Rendsburg (born 1954) is a professor of biblical studies, Hebrew language, and ancient Judaism at Rutgers University in New Brunswick, New Jersey. He holds the rank of Distinguished Professor and serves as the Blanche and Irving Laurie Chair of Jewish History at Rutgers University (2004–present), with positions in the Department of Jewish Studies and the Department of History.

Prior to teaching at Rutgers, Rendsburg taught for 18 years at Cornell University in Ithaca, N.Y. (1986-2004) and for six years at Canisius College in Buffalo, N.Y. (1980-1986).

== Education ==
Rendsburg received his B.A. degree in English and Journalism from the University of North Carolina at Chapel Hill (1975), and his M.A. and Ph.D. degrees in Hebrew Studies from New York University (1977, 1980).

== Career ==
=== Research interests ===
Rendsburg's main research interests are the literature of the Bible, the history of ancient Israel, the historical development of the Hebrew language, the relationship between ancient Egypt and ancient Israel, the Dead Sea Scrolls, and medieval Hebrew manuscripts. He also teaches courses and offers lectures on the whole breadth of Jewish history and religion, with a special focus on the development of Judaism in the post-biblical period.

==== Hebrew dialects ====
Rendsburg is best known for his work on Israelian Hebrew, the dialect of ancient Hebrew used in the northern part of Israel (more or less contiguous with the territory of the kingdom of Israel, which existed 930-721 B.C.E.). The dialect stands in contrast to Judahite Hebrew, the dialect used in the southern part of the country (in Judah in general and in Jerusalem in particular), in which the vast majority of the biblical books are composed. While earlier scholars had postulated the existence of a northern Hebrew dialect, and had offered a few lexical and grammatical features as evidence thereto, Rendsburg greatly expanded our knowledge of Israelian Hebrew by identifying sections of the Bible written in the dialect and by creating a much longer list of linguistic traits specific to this dialect. He built his case based both on internal biblical evidence and on the fact that many Israelian Hebrew features occur in Phoenician, Moabite, and Aramaic, dialects and languages which border the territory of northern (and Transjordanian) Israel, but not Judah in the south.

Rendsburg further proposed that Mishnaic Hebrew, a Hebrew dialect used in post-biblical times, especially for the composition of early rabbinic texts, was also a northern dialect of ancient Hebrew. He noted that many Israelian Hebrew features continue in Mishnaic Hebrew; and he further observed that the Mishnah and related texts were compiled in Sepphoris or elsewhere in the Galilee, so that the geography makes sense as well.

In his earlier work Rendsburg also addressed the question of diglossia in ancient Hebrew. To his mind, Biblical Hebrew is essentially a literary dialect, used for the composition of texts, whereas spoken Hebrew in ancient Israel diverged in its morphology and syntax. Rendsburg used departures from the grammatical norm found in the Bible, along with parallels from other spoken Semitic languages (especially Arabic, but also Ethiopian), to reconstruct the spoken dialect of ancient Hebrew.

Rendsburg also has contributed to the issue of diachrony in ancient Hebrew, with special attention to the differences between Standard Biblical Hebrew (of the pre-exilic period) and Late Biblical Hebrew (of the post-exilic period).

Rendsburg's work on Qumran Hebrew accepts the theory advanced by William Schniedewind, which holds that the main dialect of the Dead Sea Scrolls constitutes an anti-language, a somewhat artificial construct used to distinguish the Essenes' Hebrew from that of other Jewish groups of the time.

==== A Challenge to the Documentary Hypothesis ====
While Rendsburg accepts the clear distinctions between the Priestly and Deuteronomic legal-cultic material in the Torah, he has argued for viewing the prose stories in the Torah as emanating from a single voice. In his view, the manifold interconnections between and among various passages within the prose accounts (for example, in the book of Genesis and in the Exodus account) bespeak a single narrative voice. This approach stands in contrast to the adherents of the Documentary Hypothesis (JEDP Theory), which holds that different passages in the narratives are to be ascribed to different sources (especially J, E and P).

==== Hebrew stylistics ====
Rendsburg has written widely on a host of ancient Hebrew literary and stylistic devices, including wordplay, alliteration, style-switching, repetition with variation, and the intentional use of confused syntax. All of these topics and more are included in his book, How the Bible Is Written.

==== Egypt and Israel ====
Rendsburg has contributed in two ways in this arena. First, he has addressed the question of the evidence for the Sojourn-Slavery-Exodus account, presented at the end of the book of Genesis and the beginning of the book of Exodus, and the dates thereof; and secondly, he has shown how Egyptian literary, religious, and magical topoi resonate within the Moses story.

==== Medieval Hebrew manuscripts ====
Rendsburg has developed three websites devoted to medieval Hebrew manuscripts:

The first (developed with Jacob Binstein) is devoted to the book of Ben Sira, whose documentary evidence ranges from Qumran and Masada in antiquity to the Cairo Genizah in the medieval period, and whose manuscripts are found in Cambridge, Oxford, London, Paris, Jerusalem, New York, and Los Angeles. Rendsburg and Binstein aggregated all of this material at a single website, so that scholars now may inspect the diverse manuscripts more readily.

The second (developed with Joshua Blachorsky) presents to the public an incomplete yet very valuable manuscript of the Mishnah, known as JTS MS R1622.1, housed in the Library of the Jewish Theological Seminary. Until the development of the website, the manuscript remained unpublished, though now scholars from around the world may access it via the internet.

The third (developed with Peter Moshe Shamah) reunites all of the documentary evidence from the Cairo Genizah relevant to the life of Johannes of Oppido = Obadiah the Proselyte at a single website. The documents include the Obadiah Memoir, the Epistle of R. Barukh of Aleppo, the Siddur that Obadiah wrote for himself, and his musical compositions (Hebrew prayers set to Gregorian chant).

== Books ==
- The Redaction of Genesis (1986/2014), which argues for the literary unity of the book of Genesis.
- Diglossia in Ancient Hebrew (1990), which treats the colloquialisms embedded in the text of the Hebrew Bible.
- Linguistic Evidence for the Northern Origin of Selected Psalms (1990), which presents a detailed analysis of several dozen poems in the book of Psalms.
- The Bible and the Ancient Near East (1997), co-authored with Cyrus H. Gordon, intended for the general reader and for use as a college textbook.
- Israelian Hebrew in the Book of Kings (2002), a further exploration into the question of regional dialects of ancient Hebrew.
- Solomon's Vineyard: Literary and Linguistic Studies in the Song of Songs (2009), co-authored with Scott Noegel, analyzing the language and the poetry of the Song of Songs.
- How the Bible Is Written (2019), on the nexus between language and literature in the Hebrew Bible.

Additional Publications

In addition to these books, Rendsburg has published over 200 articles in scholarly journals and monograph collections in the U.S., Canada, Europe, Israel, Australia, South Africa, and Japan. Most of them are available at his publications website in pdf format.

Rendsburg also served as one of the associate editors of the Encyclopedia of Hebrew Language and Linguistics (2013).

Additional teaching and research positions

During his career, Rendsburg also has served as an adjunct faculty member, as a visiting faculty member, or as a visiting research fellow at the following institutions: Hebrew University, Bar-Ilan University, University of Oxford, University of Cambridge, Tyndale House, University of Sydney, Pontifical Biblical Institute, Getty Villa, University of California, Los Angeles, University of Pennsylvania, Colgate University, and Binghamton University.

Rendsburg was awarded a National Endowment for the Humanities Fellowship for College Teachers in 1986-1987, enabling him to conduct research in Israel during that academic year.

Rendsburg has traveled extensively in the Near East, he has participated in excavations at Tel Dor and Caesarea, and he has visited all the major archaeological sites of Israel, Egypt, and Jordan.

Relevant to his work on medieval Hebrew manuscripts (see above), Rendsburg has studied manuscripts at the following libraries: Bodleian Library (Oxford), Cambridge University Library, Biblioteca Apostolica Vaticana, the National Library of Israel, the Library of Congress, Fisher Library of the University of Sydney, and others.

Multimedia

Rendsburg has produced two courses for The Great Courses (formerly known as the Teaching Company), on "The Book of Genesis" (2006) and "The Dead Sea Scrolls" (2010).

In addition, he produced an online mini-course, "The Bible and History" (free and available to the public at large) available through the Bildner Center for the Study of Jewish Life at Rutgers University (2022).

== See also ==
- Yehezkel Kaufman
- Umberto Cassuto
- Joshua Berman
