= Aaron D. Rubin =

American linguistics researcher (born 1976)

- Born: June 30, 1976 (age 50)

Academic background
- Education: University of Pennsylvania; Harvard University
- Thesis: Studies in Semitic Grammaticalization (2004)

Academic work
- Discipline: Linguist
- Sub-discipline: Semitic languages, Jewish languages

Aaron David Rubin (born June 30, 1976) is an American linguistics researcher. He is currently the Ann and Jay Davis Professor of Jewish Studies at The University of Georgia. From 2004 to 2023 he was Malvin and Lea Bank Professor of Classics & Ancient Mediterranean Studies, Jewish Studies, and Linguistics at Penn State University. His main area of study is the Semitic language family, focusing on Hebrew, Arabic, Aramaic, and the modern languages of Southern Arabia, especially Mehri and Jibbali. He has also worked extensively on non-Semitic Jewish languages, as well as on Hebrew and Jewish manuscripts. At Penn State, he has taught numerous language courses (on Hebrew, Arabic, Aramaic, and Yiddish), as well lecture courses on the Bible, Jewish and Ancient Near Eastern literature, and the history of writing systems. He received a Guggenheim Fellowship in 2016.

== Education ==
Rubin received his B.A. and M.A. degrees in linguistics from the University of Pennsylvania (1998, 1999), and Ph.D. degree in Near Eastern languages and civilizations from Harvard University (2004). His M.A. thesis was titled "An Introduction to the Comparative Grammar of Egyptian and Semitic", and his PhD dissertation was titled "Studies in Semitic Grammaticalization".

== Career ==
=== Work on Modern South Arabian ===
Some of Rubin's most significant contributions to the field of Semitics have been focused on the Modern South Arabian languages of Oman. His books, The Mehri Language of Oman (2010) and The Jibbali (Shaḥri) Language of Oman: Grammar and Texts (2014), were both the first grammars of those languages. The latter volume also included many texts, which were the first Jibbali texts published in over a century. His 2010 grammar of Mehri has been superseded by his Omani Mehri: A New Grammar with Texts (2018), which also includes over 100 texts. In addition to his grammars, he has published numerous articles on the Modern South Arabian languages.

=== Work on Jewish languages ===
In 2016, Rubin co-edited (with Lily Kahn) the Handbook of Jewish Languages. It includes descriptions of around 25 different Jewish languages, some of which (such as Israeli Amharic, Jewish Russian, and Jewish Malayalam) had been the subject of little to no previously published scholarship. Rubin's contribution on Judeo-Italian is the most comprehensive reference available on that language. Rubin and Kahn also wrote Jewish Languages from A to Z (2020), including chapters on more than 40 different languages, and aimed at a more general audience. Rubin has also published the first work on Judeo-Urdu, namely, an edition and study of a 19th-century Hebrew–Urdu glossary, all written in Hebrew characters.

=== Work on Ethiopian Semitic ===
Besides several articles related to Amharic and other Ethiopian Semitic languages, Rubin published the first comprehensive grammar of Kistane, one of the Gurage languages, in 2026.

== Publications ==
=== Books written ===
- Studies in Semitic Grammaticalization (2005)
- Samuel David Luzzatto, Prolegomena to a Grammar of the Hebrew Language (2005)
- The Mehri Language of Oman (2010)
- A Brief Introduction to the Semitic Languages (2010)
- The Jibbali (Shaḥri) Language of Oman: Grammar and Texts (2014)
- A Unique Hebrew Glossary from India: An Analysis of Judeo-Urdu (2016)
- Omani Mehri: A New Grammar with Texts (2018)
- Jewish Languages from A to Z (with Lily Kahn, 2021)
- A Grammar of Kistane (Ethiopian Semitic) (2026)

=== Books edited ===
- Studies in Classical Linguistics in Honor of Philip Baldi (with B. Richard Page, 2010)
- Encyclopedia of Hebrew Language and Linguistics (with Geoffrey Khan, et al., 2013)
- Epigraphy, Philology, and the Hebrew Bible (with Jeremy Hutton, 2015)
- Handbook of Jewish Languages (with Lily Kahn, 2016) (revised and updated paperback edition published in 2017)
- Linguistic and Philological Studies of the Hebrew Bible and its Manuscripts: In Honor of Gary A. Rendsburg (with Vincent D. Beiler, 2023)
