= Nabonassar (7th century BC) =

7th century high priest of the Eanna temple in Uruk

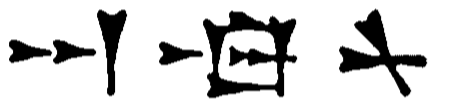
Nabonassar (Babylonian cuneiform: Nabû-nāṣir, meaning "Nabu (is) protector") was a high priest (šatammu) of the Eanna temple in Uruk in the reign of the Neo-Assyrian king Esarhaddon (r. 681–669 BC), attested as such from 678 to 675 BC. He is very likely to have been the father of Nebuchadnezzar, governor of Uruk under Esarhaddon's successor Ashurbanipal (r. 669–631 BC), and the grandfather of Nabopolassar (r. 626–605 BC), the first king of the Neo-Babylonian Empire, making Nabonassar the progenitor of the Chaldean dynasty of Babylonian kings.

In addition to Nebuchadnezzar, it is probable that Nabonassar was also the father of Bēl-uballiṭ, who is recorded as high priest of the same temple in 642 BC, and of Bel-uballit's colleague and brother, Nabu-ušabši.
