= Anson Rainey =

Scholar of the ancient Near East and Semitic linguistics (1930–2011)

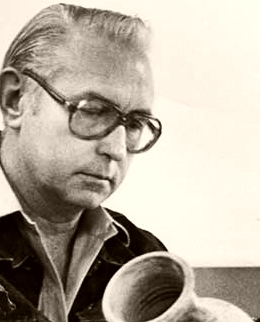
Anson Rainey (1980)

Anson Frank Rainey (January 11, 1930 – February 19, 2011) was professor emeritus of ancient Near Eastern cultures and Semitic linguistics at Tel Aviv University. He is known in particular for contributions to the study of the Amarna tablets, the noted administrative letters from the period of Pharaoh Akhenaten's rule during the 18th Dynasty of Egypt. He authored and edited books and articles on the cultures, languages and geography of the Biblical lands.

== Early life ==
Anson Rainey was born in Dallas, Texas, in 1930. Upon the death of his father that same year, he was left with his maternal grandparents. He attended Brown Military Academy in San Diego, California, from 1943 to 1946. After one semester of study there—as a cadet battalion commander—he served as assistant commandant at Southern California Military Academy in Long Beach, California, for the spring semester of 1947, before transferring to John Brown University in Siloam Springs, Arkansas.

== Education ==
From 1948 to 1949 he worked as assistant commandant at the Brown Military Academy of the Ozarks, in Sulphur Springs, Arkansas, while attending university. He took the B.A. degree there in religious education in August 1949. From 1949 to 1951, he worked as a social worker for the San Bernardino County Welfare Department in California. He went on to enroll in the California Baptist Theological Seminary in Covina, California, where he took three degrees: an M.A. in Old Testament (May 1953); a B.D. in Biblical theology (May 1954); and an M.Th. in Old Testament (May 1955).

From September 1953 until May 1954, Rainey was a teaching fellow in Hebrew, Old Testament and New Testament introduction. In 1954 he was appointed assistant professor and taught for two more years. From 1955 to 1956, he studied at the University of California, Los Angeles and completed the B.A. with Honors in August 1956. In 1957, he began graduate study at Brandeis University, where he earned an M.A. in June 1959. He spent a third year of residence (1959–60), studying for his Ph.D. He came to Israel in June 1960, as the sole American recipient of the Government of Israel Award. From 1960 to 1961, he studied at the Hebrew University, first in an intensive Hebrew course and then in archaeology and in the Egyptian, Coptic and Phoenician languages, all in Hebrew. At the same time, he completed the basic research for his doctoral dissertation. In 1961, he returned to Brandeis as a research assistant. Upon completion of his dissertation on the Social Structure of Ugarit, he was awarded his Ph.D. in June 1962.

However, Rainey's main activity for the academic year 1962–63 was research and study under a grant from the Warburg Fund at the Hebrew University. This award was renewed for 1963–64, and the book that resulted was translated into Hebrew and published by the Bialik Institute in August 1967. It was a revision of his earlier dissertation, expanded to include new source material that had subsequently become available. He began teaching Ugaritic and Akkadian at Tel Aviv University. From 1965 to 1966, he served as acting chairman of the Ancient Near Eastern Studies Department. In 1966, his status was changed to lecturer in Semitic languages. A year later he was appointed senior lecturer. In 1970 he was elevated to associate professor of ancient Near Eastern cultures. The department was reorganized under the title, Archaeology and Ancient Near Eastern Cultures, in which he served as coordinator for Mesopotamian studies until October 1975. A new department of Semitic linguistics was also organized, and from 1971 to 1972 he was its acting chairman. He was promoted to the rank of full professor of ancient Near Eastern cultures and Semitic linguistics effective July 1, 1981.

== Scholarship ==
Rainey served on the editorial boards of Israel Oriental Studies, an annual, and of Tel Aviv, a quarterly, both publications of Tel Aviv University. He continued his connection with the American Institute of Holy Land Studies—now the Jerusalem University College—teaching Historical Geography and, for six years, from 1964 to 1969, conducting their intensive program of geographical field trips. During the 1960s and 1970s, he pursued additional studies at the Hebrew University in Akkadian, Sumerian and Egyptian. He took a sabbatical leave in 1970–71, during which time he remained in Jerusalem to study. For a second sabbatical, he was awarded a grant by the American Council of Learned Societies. On the basis of this award he was able to spend 1976–77 as an honorary research fellow at Harvard University. Grants from the Research for Peace Project of Tel Aviv University made possible three visits to the Cairo Museum from 1980 to 1982 and the el-‘Amârna Tablets in the museum were all collated.

From 1982 to 1985 he began teaching part-time at Bar Ilan University in the Department of Eretz-Israel Studies. During a third sabbatical in 1983–84, he was visiting research scholar at the University of Pennsylvania. During a fourth sabbatical in 1988–89, he was again visiting research scholar at that university. During a fifth sabbatical for 1995–96, he was again visiting research scholar at the university, where he also taught a seminar in Northwest Semitic inscriptions. From 1996 until September 30, 1998, he continued to teach as full professor at Tel Aviv University. On October 1, 1998, he became emeritus professor there but taught a course in historical geography during the academic years 1998–99, 1999–2000 and 2000–2001.

He spent July 1999 in Jordan studying historical geography and archaeology. In August and September 1999 he spent the sabbatical time working at the British Museum collating el-‘Amârna tablets. Sixty-six texts were read and many substantial corrections were discovered. Four days were spent at the Vorderasiatisches Museum Berlin where eleven texts were collated, some with new readings and corrections. Further collations were made at the Metropolitan Museum of New York in November 1999, and at the British Museum and at the Oriental Institute of the University of Chicago in January and February 2000, bringing the total of collated texts up to about 100. A third visit to the United Kingdom in April 2001 was made to complete the collation of texts in the British Museum and also those in the Ashmolean Museum, Oxford. Fall 2001 was spent at the University of California, Los Angeles, where consultation began with the Cuneiform Digital Library Initiative in digitizing the Amarna tablets in the Berlin Museum. During the spring 2002 semester, he was invited to teach as a visiting professor of historical geography and Ancient Hebrew at Konkuk University in Seoul, South Korea. In August and September 2002 he was a visiting research scholar at the University of Melbourne, Australia.

From 2002 to 2007 he taught as adjunct professor at Bar Ilan University, Orot College and Jerusalem University College. From 2003 to 2004 he spent ten months collating the el-‘Amârna tablets at the Vorderasiatische Museum in Berlin and at other venues in Europe. A completely new edition of the tablets is envisioned along with photographic and internet recording. The edition of the texts and the notes derived from collations will be placed on the internet. During the 53rd Rencontre of the International Association of Assyriologists in Moscow in July 2007, he collated the last three el-‘Amârna tablets, at the Pushkin Museum.

== Death ==
Anson Rainey died, aged 81, from pancreatic cancer in Tel Hashomer, Israel.

His wife Zipora Cochavi-Rainey, continued his research on the el-‘Amârna tablets after his death.
