= Zipora Cochavi-Rainey =

Israeli linguist and scholar

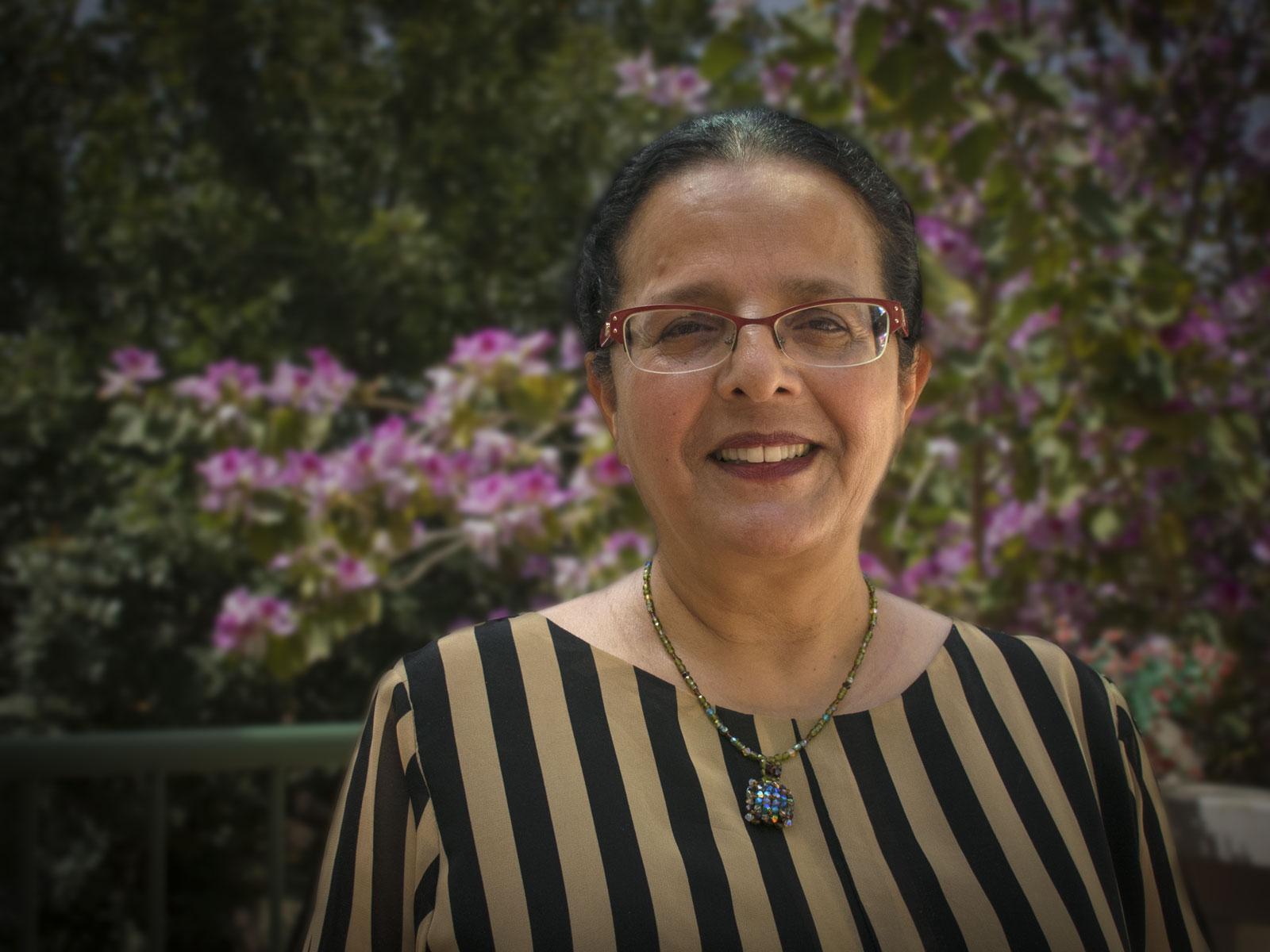

Zipora Cochavi-Rainey (Hebrew: ציפורה כוכבי-רייני born December 1954) is Professor Emerita. She is an Israeli linguist and scholar in the Department of Hebrew Language at Beit Berl College.

== Early life and education ==
Cochavi-Rainey grew up in Ramat Gan, Israel, the second of five children. Her parents, Zehava, and Moshe Cochavi, immigrated from Yemen to pre-state Israel as small children. Her mother became the head of a paramedic team in the Israeli Magen David Adom and her father a building contractor. Although Cochavi-Rainey was raised in a religiously observant home, she was educated in non-religious schools. No longer religious from the age of about twelve, she remained observant in her parents’ home.

Cochavi-Rainey began to take an interest in linguistics at the age of nine. She excelled in language studies and began to audit language courses at Tel Aviv University while still in High school. During her army service years, when she was stationed in the military headquarter complex of the Israel Defense Forces, Cochavi Rainey enrolled in Tel Aviv University and worked toward her B.A. She completed her undergraduate degree in 1978 with a major in Semitic and Hamitic Languages and her M.A, in 1983. Her thesis, mentored by Raphael Kutscher, dealt with a linguistic analysis of the Akkadian dialect of Egyptian scribes’ letters which were discovered in El-Amarna archive. She completed her PhD in 1989. Her dissertation, mentored by Sumerologist and Assyriologist, Raphael Kutcher and Egyptologist, Mordechai Gilula, was titled: The Akkadian Dialect of Egyptian Scribes in the 14th and the 13th centuries B.C.E.

== Career ==
Cochavi-Rainey has been a member of the Hebrew language department in Beit Berl Academic College, Israel since 1986. She taught doctoral students at Bar-Ilan University and Hebrew language at Gratz College and the Reconstructionist Rabbinical College in Philadelphia, U.S.A..

In 1994-1995, she taught the phonology and morphology of Biblical Hebrew at University of Pennsylvania in Philadelphia U.S.A. Her scholarly books and articles deal primarily with the linguistic and stylistic-linguistic aspects of ancient Middle Eastern written texts, cuneiform and hieroglyphics in particular, and with modern Hebrew literature.

Together with her husband, Anson Rainey, Cochavi-Rainey has dealt extensively with the El Amarna letters, the correspondence between the King of Egypt and peoples of the region, from the middle of the 14th and 13th centuries B.C.E. After Rainey’s death, she continued and completed his work on the subject.

=== Relationship with Naomi Frankel ===
During her army service, Cochavi-Rainey befriended Israeli author Naomi Frankel, a relationship that lasted until Frankel’s death in 2009. During those years, she wrote books and articles on the linguistic and linguistic-stylistic features in Naomi Frankel’s two Novels, Barkai and Preda (Farewell). She also worked on Frankel’s biography, as related to her by the author and based upon well documented references. In addition, Cochavi-Rainey wrote two screen scripts based upon Frankel’s novels, Barkai and Preda (Farewell), the former adapted for the stage and performed in Salamanca (Teatro Liceo) and Toledo (Teatro de Rojas), Spain.

== Personal life ==
In 1982, Cochavi-Rainey married her university professor, Anson Rainey, a former minister and convert to Judaism. Their son, Yohanan (Yoni), named after the archeologist Yohanan Aharoni, is a mathematician and expert on the Arab-Israeli conflict. She and her husband built their home in Sha’arei Tikva, Samaria, in part, in order to house their private library of over five thousand books.

== Selected publications ==
=== Books ===
- Sivan, D. and Cochavi-Rainey, Z. (1992). West Semitic Vocabulary in Egyptian Script of the 14th to the 10th Centuries BCE. Beer-Sheva, vol. VI. Studies by the Department of Bible and Ancient Near East. Beer Sheva: Ben-Gurion University of the Negev Press.
- (1999). Royal Gifts in the Late Bronze Age` Selected Texts Recording Gifts to Royal Personages. With archaeological contributions by Lilyquist, Ch. Beer-Sheva, vol. XIII. Studies by the Department of Bible and Ancient Near East. Beer Sheva: Ben-Gurion University of the Negev Press.
- (2003). The Akkadian Texts Written by Alashian Scribes in the 14th-13th Centuries. Munster: Ugarit Verlag.
- (2004). Sights, Colors, Lights and Sounds - Linguistic-Stylistic Analysis of "Barkai" by Naomi Frankel. Jerusalem : (Hebrew). Gefen Publishing House. (in Hebrew).
- (2005). To the King my Lord. (Hebrew). Jerusalem : Mosad Bialik. (in Hebrew).
- (2007). "Preda" ("Farewell") by Naomi Frankel - Literary, Linguistic and Linguistic-Stylistic Analysis. (Hebrew). Jerusalem : Gefen Publishing House, 2007. (in Hebrew).
- (2011). The Akkadian Dialect of the 14th to the 13th Centuries BCE. AOAT 374. Münster: Ugarit Verlag.
- (2013). Cochavi-Rainey, Z (2013). Malkat Hakunchia ("Seashell Queen"), Volume 1. To the Light (Hebrew and Russian). Jerusalem : Gefen Publishing House.
- (2013). Malkat Hakunchia ("Seashell Queen"), Volume 2. Sunrise and Sunset (Hebrew and Russian). Jerusalem : Gefen Publishing House.
- (2013). Malkat Hakunchia ("Seashell Queen"), Volume 3. Victory of Spirit (Hebrew). Jerusalem : Gefen Publishing House.
- (2015). The Tell El-Amarna Correspondence: Volume 2. Leiden-Boston. (edited and completed).
- (2018) Cochavi-Rainey, Z. The Letters of Shlonsky – Linguistic and Stylistic Study. (Hebrew). Jerusalem : Gefen Publishing House. (in Hebrew).

=== Articles ===
- (1989). Tenses and Modes in Cuneiform Texts Written by Egyptian Scribes in the Late Bronze Age. Ugarit Furschungen 21, pp. 5–23.
- (1989). Canaanite Influence in the Akkadian Texts Written by Egyptian Scribes in the 14th and 13th Centuries B.C.E. Ugarit Furschungen, 21, pp. 39–46.
- (1990). Egyptian Influence in the Akkadian Texts Written by Egyptian Scribes in the Fourteenth and Thirteenth Centuries B.C.E. Journal of Near Eastern Studies, 49, No.1, pp. 57–65.
- Cochavi-Rainey, Z. and Rainy, A. (1990). Comparative Grammatical Notes on the Treaty between Ramses II and Hattusili III. pp. 796- Israeli-Groll, ed., Studies in Egyptology Presented to Miriam Lichtheim. Jerusalem: Magness Press.
- (1993). The Style and Syntax of EA 1. Ugarit Furschungen, 25, pp. 75–84.
- (1994). Letters from Jerusalem in the Amarna Archive. Mechkare Chag, Journal of Jewish Culture 5, pp. 90–95. (in Hebrew)*(1993). The Style and Syntax of EA 1. Ugarit Furschungen, 25, pp. 75–84.
- (1997). Egyptian Influence in the Amarna Texts. Ugarit Furschungen, 29, pp. 55–114.
- (1997). Selected Similes, Descriptions, and Figures of Speech from El-Amarna Letters and Their Biblical Parallels. Leshonenu, Vol. 60, pp. 165–179. (in Hebrew)
- (1998). Some Grammatical Notes on EA 14, Israel Oriental Studies, 18, pp. 207–228.
- (2004). Morpho-syntactic and semantic analysis of the novel "Barkai" by Naomi Frankel. Balshanut ivrit 54, 23-36 (in Hebrew)
- (2005). Some Linguistic and Linguistic-Stylistic Features in Naomi Frankel’s Novel Preda ("Departure"). Moʿed, Vol. 15, 2005, pp. 144–196. (in Hebrew)
- Cochavi-Rainey, Z. and Rainey, A. F. (2008). Finite verbal usage in the Jerusalem Amarna letters. Ugarit Furschungen, 39, pp. 37–56.
