= Tamar Sovran =

Hebrew Culture Studies researcher

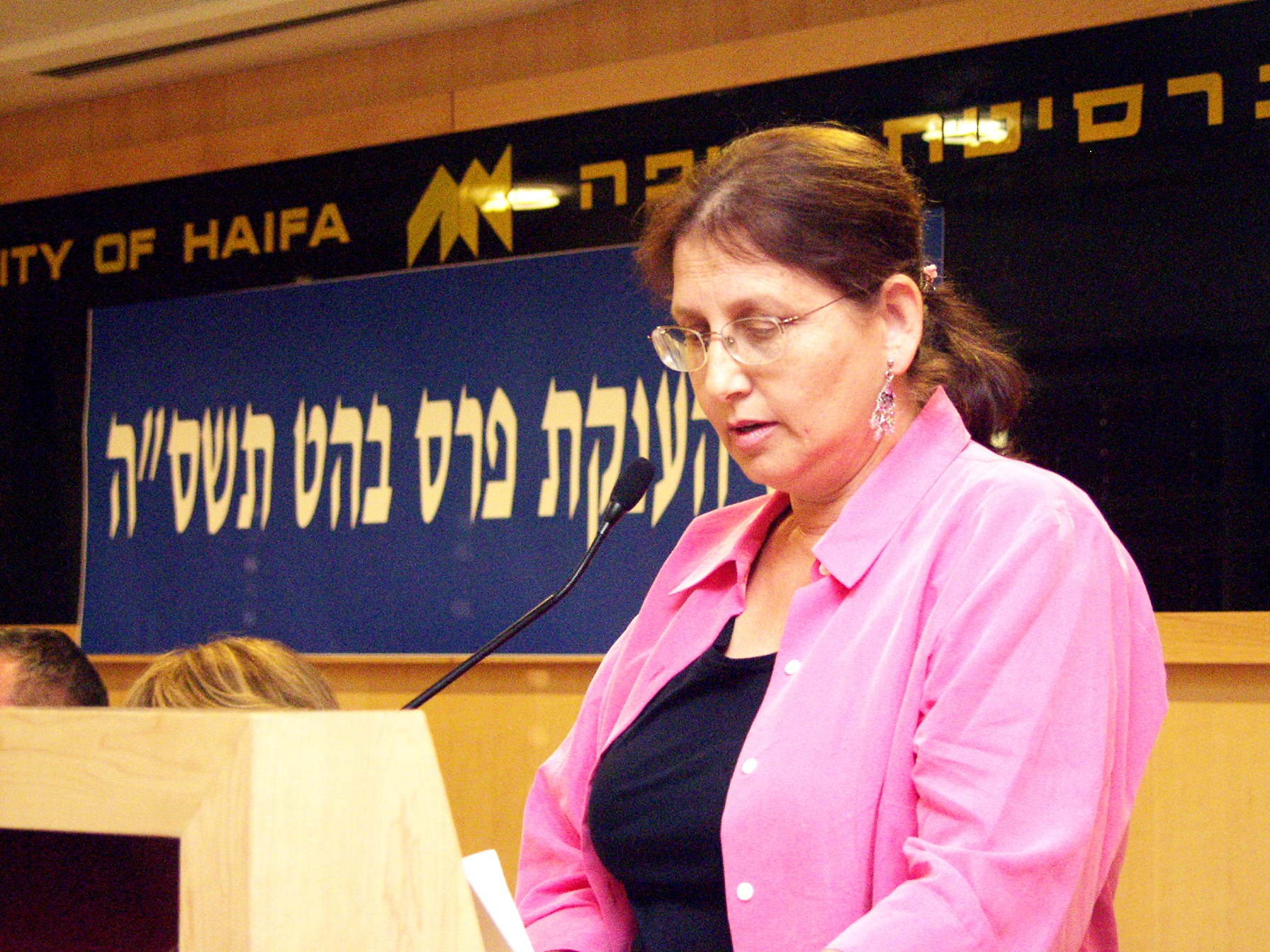
Tamar Sovran

Tamar Sovran (Hebrew: תמר סוברן; born 1948 in Rishon LeZion) is an Israeli linguist and Hebrew Culture Studies researcher in the Language Department of Tel Aviv University.

== Biography ==
Sovran was born in Rishon leZion, the second daughter of Lea and Gershon Mann (Minkow), sister of Nira and Na'ama. She served in the Israel Defence Forces.

She graduated with distinction in Hebrew Language and Literature and Philosophy from the Hebrew University of Jerusalem. She received her master's degree with distinction and Ph.D. in Philosophy of Language from the same university, then undertook postdoctoral studies in Linguistics and Cognitive Studies at the University of California, Berkeley.She lived with her family in the Erez kibbutz between 1972 and 1994.

Sovran taught Hebrew language, literature and philosophy at Sha'ar Hanegev high school and Sapir College, then taught philosophy and linguistics at Ben-Gurion University of the Negev. She later taught modern Hebrew in the Amirim honors program for outstanding students at the Hebrew University, and in the Culture and Interpretation Doctoral Studies program at Bar-Ilan University.

She is currently professor of Hebrew Language at Tel Aviv University. She founded the Hebrew and Jewish Studies program at the university's Hebrew Culture Studies department and chaired it from 2007 to 2010. Since August 2013, she has chaired the Hebrew Culture Studies department.

Sovran is married to Benjamin Sovran (Wonsover) and is the mother of three sons: Roy, Yair, and Iddo. She lives with her family in Ramat Gan.

== Research and main contributions ==
Sovran has three main lines of research: cognitive semantics (specialising in semantic fields and frames and the theory of metaphor), poetic semantics (the contribution of linguistic semantic analysis to literary interpretation), and the revival and development of styles in Modern Hebrew prose and poetry.

== Selected works ==
=== Books ===
- Semantic fields, The Hebrew University Magnes Press, Jerusalem 1994
- Investigations in conceptual semantics, The Hebrew University Magnes Press, Jerusalem 2000
- Language and meaning – the birth and growth of cognitive semantics, University of Haifa Press, 2006 (Winner of Bahat prize for the best nonfiction book, 2005)
- Relational Semantics and The Anatomy of Abstraction. Routledge, New York. 2013

=== Edited books and volumes ===
- New Faces and Directions in Contemporary Jewish Studies. Teuda vol. 24. 2011
- Poetic semantics – Guest editor Balshanut Ivrit vol. 67. 2013.
- Xelkat Lashon Vol 43- 44 (with Ruth Burstein), 2012
