= The Bible and violence =

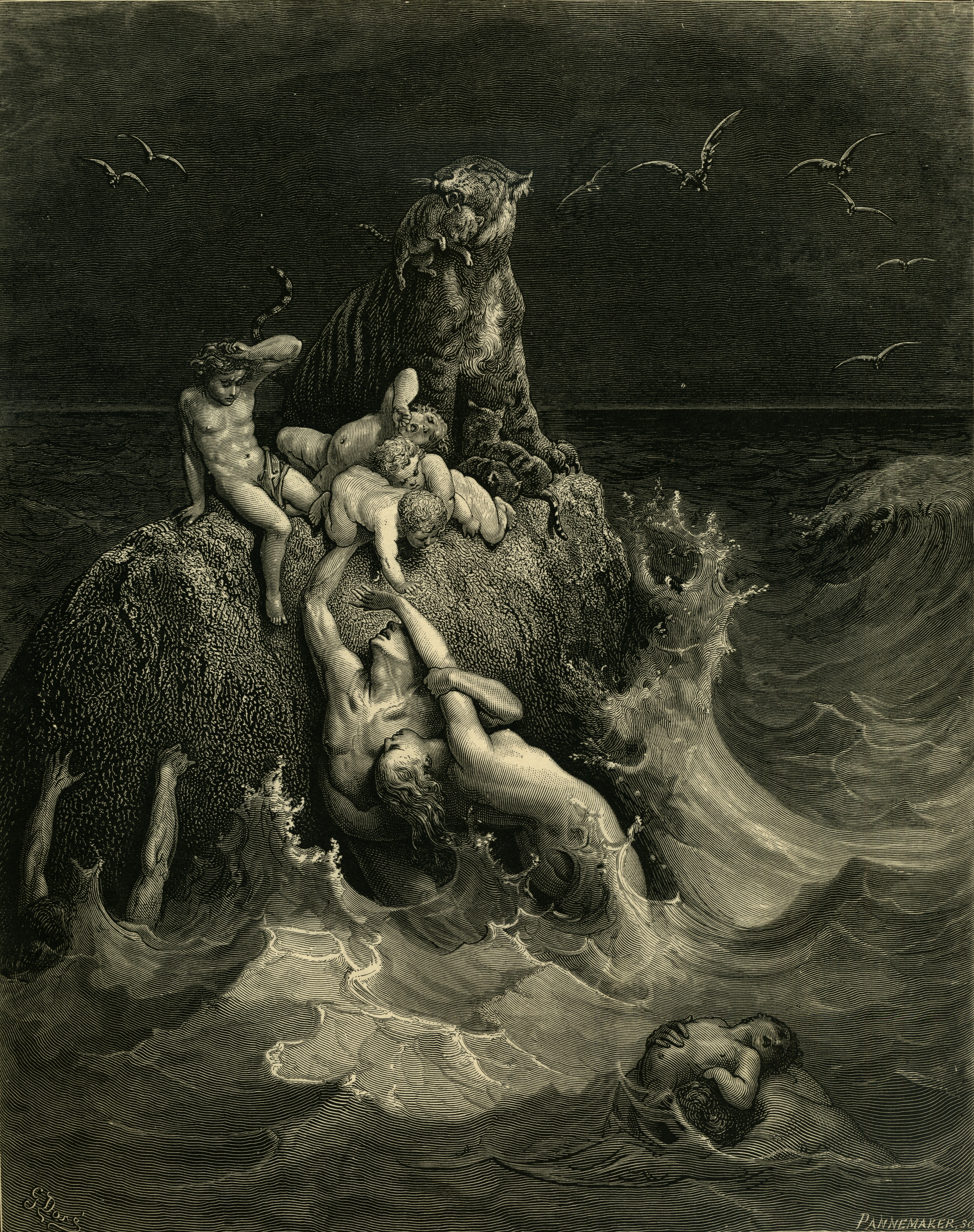
"The Deluge" by Gustave Doré

The Hebrew Bible and the New Testament both contain narratives, poems, and instructions which describe, encourage, command, condemn, reward, punish and regulate violent actions by God, individuals, groups, governments, and nation-states. Among the violent acts referred to are war, human sacrifice, animal sacrifice, murder, rape, genocide, and criminal punishment. Violence is defined around four main areas: that which damages the environment, dishonest or oppressive speech, and issues of justice and purity. War is a special category of violence that is addressed in four different ways including pacifism, non-resistance, just war and crusade.

The biblical narrative has a history of interpretation within Abrahamic religions and Western culture that have used the texts for both justification of and opposition to acts of violence. There are a wide variety of views interpreting biblical texts on violence theologically and sociologically. The problem of evil, violence against women, the absence of violence in the story of creation, the presence of Shalom (peace), the nature of Hell, and the emergence of replacement theology are all aspects of these differing views.

== Definition ==
The definition of what constitutes violence has changed over time. In the twenty-first century, the definition has broadened considerably to include acts that used to be seen as acceptable. Modern scholarship on violence in the Bible tends to fall into two categories: those who use modern ethics to critique what they see as the violent legacy of monotheism, and those who approach the topic from a historical and cultural perspective. The Bible reflects how perceptions of violence changed over time for its authors and its readers.

Biblical writers defined and interpreted violence in culturally specific terms based upon the values of the age in which they lived using their own themes, cultural explanations, and theological logic. They defined anything that destroys the ecological environment as a form of violence. They depict scheming, arrogant and dishonest speech, especially speech aimed at oppressing the poor, as violent in both cause and effect. Violations of justice are defined as particularly egregious forms of violence. Violations of purity and sanctity are seen as a kind of violence that defiles the land, its people, and the sanctuary. It is accompanied by disgust on the part of the biblical writers.

=== Warfare and herem ===
Warfare represents a special category of biblical violence and is a topic the Bible addresses, directly and indirectly, in four ways: there are verses that support pacifism, and verses that support non-resistance; 4th century theologian Augustine found the basis of just war in the Bible, and preventive war which is sometimes called crusade has also been supported using Bible texts. Historian Susan Niditch says the range of war ideologies in ancient Near Eastern culture can be seen by understanding attitudes toward war in the Hebrew Bible. In the Hebrew Bible warfare includes the Amalekites, Canaanites, Moabites, and the record in Exodus, Deuteronomy, Joshua, and both books of Kings.

God commands the Israelites to conquer the Promised Land, placing city after city "under the ban". The Hebrew verb ḥāram (חֲרֵ֤ם) connotes complete annihilation (New Revised Standard Version is “utterly destroy”; Deut. 7:2). The noun which is derived from the verb (ḥērem) is sometimes translated as "the ban" and it denotes the separation, exclusion and dedication of persons or objects to God which may be specially set apart for destruction (Deuteronomy 7:26; Leviticus 27:28-29). Historian Susan Niditch says "the root h-r-m links together several biblical non-war and war usages of the term ... under the heading of sacrifice."

Over half the occurrences of the verb and noun for the root ḥ-r-m are concerned with the destruction of nations in war. C. L. Crouch compares the two kingdoms of Israel and Judah to Assyria, saying their similarities in cosmology and ideology gave them similar ethical outlooks on war. Both Crouch and Lauren Monroe, professor of Near Eastern studies at Cornell, agree this means the ḥerem type of total war was not strictly an Israelite practice but was a common approach to war for many Near Eastern people of the Bronze and Iron Ages. For example, the 9th century Mesha Stele says that King Mesha of Moab fought in the name of his god Chemosh and that he subjected his enemies to ḥerem.

The Hebrew scholar Baruch A. Levine notes that Deut.7:1-11 shows that Hebrew ideology has evolved since the writing of Exodus 33:5-16, with its addition of the ban (see Exodus 20:19,20). Levine concludes that this is one of several indications, including extra-biblical evidence, that ḥērem was a later addition to Hebrew thought. Levine says this indicates that Israel was still, as late as Deuteronomy, making ideological adjustments with regard to the importation of the foreign practice of ḥērem from its source in the surrounding Near Eastern nations."

The early usage of herem indicates that the Israelites were not allowed to touch, possess, or redeem these "devoted things". However, the later usage of the term, such as its usage in Numbers 18:14-17 and Deuteronomy 7, indicates that items and first-born children were supposed to be set aside as ḥērem so that they could be redeemed by the Priests.

== Biblical narrative ==
=== Book of Genesis ===
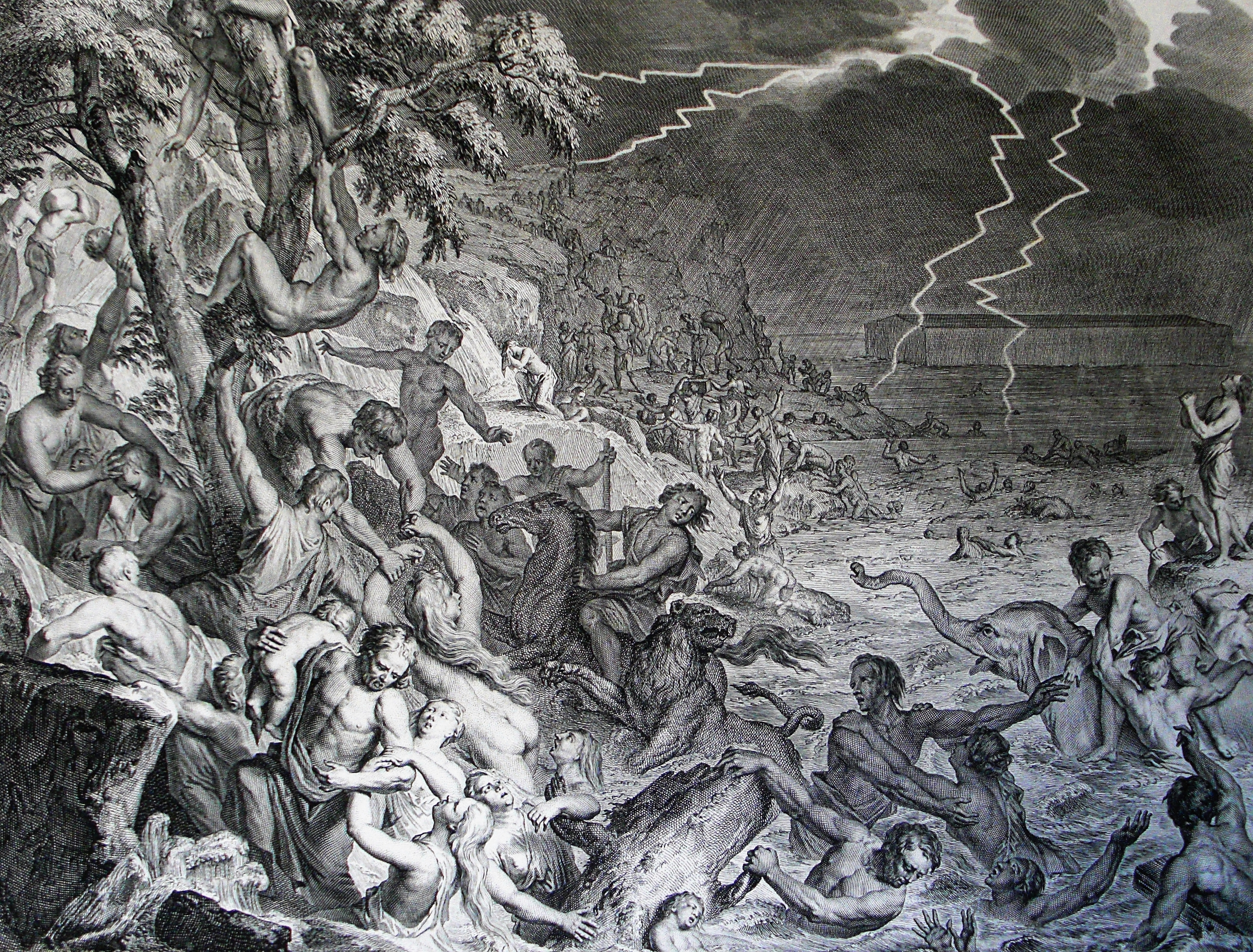
Noah's Ark and the Deluge.

Old Testament professor Jerome F. D. Creach writes that Genesis 1 and 2 present two claims that "set the stage for understanding violence in the rest of the Bible": first is the declaration the God of the Hebrews created without violence or combat which runs counter to other Near Eastern creation stories; second, these opening chapters appoint humans as divine representatives on earth as caretakers, to "establish and maintain the well-being or shalom of the whole creation". Creach says that violence is seen in these verses as an intrusion that disrupts this design. When Adam and Eve disobey God, he banishes them from the Garden of Eden, listing the curses that will follow them in (Genesis 3). In Genesis 4:1–18, the Hebrew word for sin (hattā't) appears for the first time when Cain, the first born man, murders his brother Abel and commits the first recorded act of violence. God curses Cain for this, and also grants him protection from danger.

In the Genesis flood narrative (Genesis 6–9), God sees that the "wickedness of man was great" and grieves (Genesis 6:6). Hamas, (חָמָֽס) meaning 'violence, wrongdoing', is the Hebrew Bible's primary term for violence. It is first used in Genesis 6:11: "the earth was corrupt in God's sight, and the earth was filled with violence." It occurs sixty times in the Hebrew Bible, is almost always used to identify physical violence (Genesis 49:5; Judges 9:24), and is used to describe human, not divine, violence. He decides to exterminate all, restarting creation with Noah and those humans and animals with him on the Ark. After the Flood, God promises to never again destroy all life by a flood.

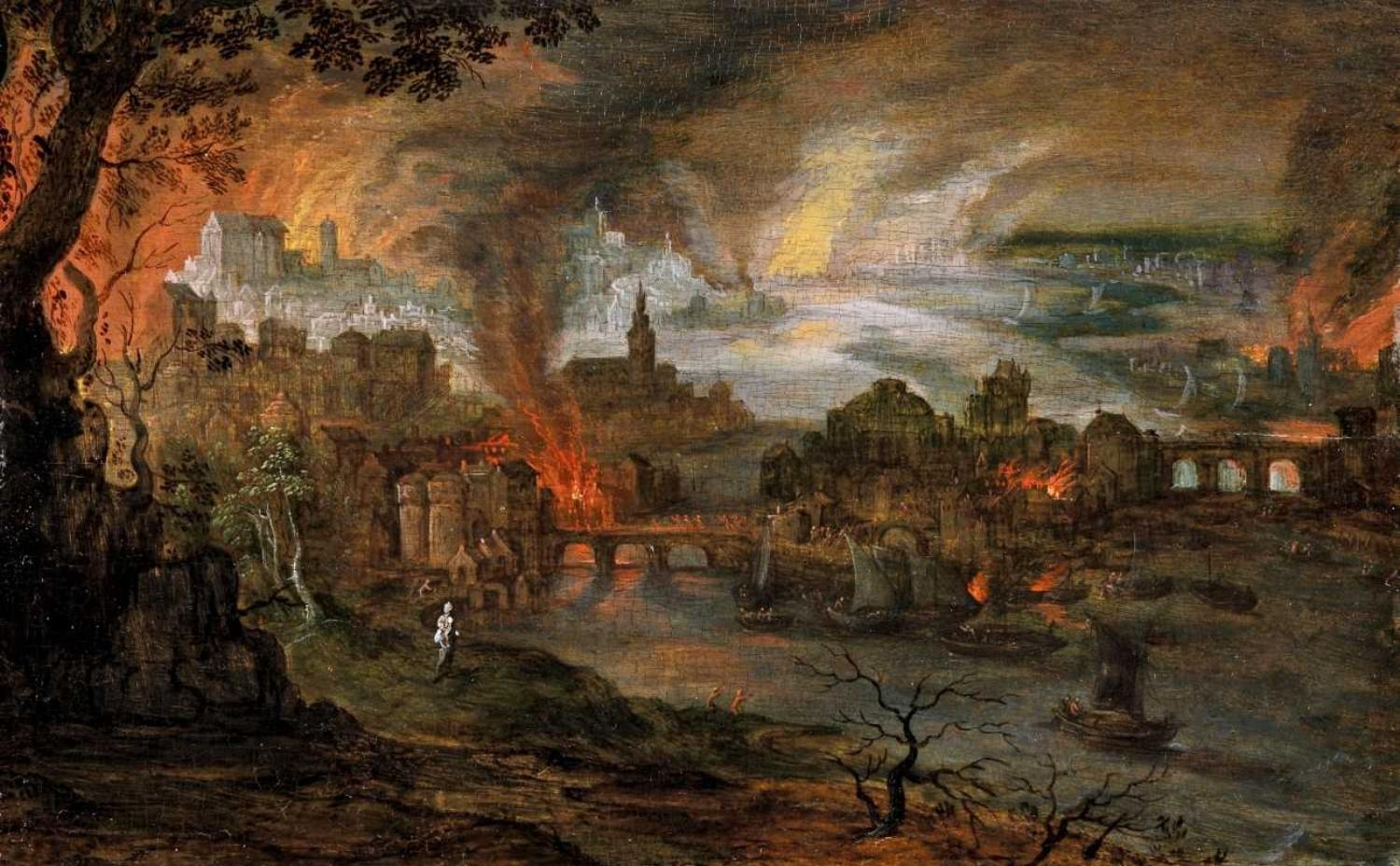
The Destruction of Sodom and Gomorrah by Pieter Schoubroeck, c.1600

In Genesis 18–19 God resolves to destroy the cities Sodom and Gomorrah, "because their sin is very grievous". God promises Abraham that he will spare Sodom if as few as 10 righteous people can be found there. The cities are destroyed, but angels save Abraham's nephew Lot and most of his family from the destruction. While fleeing, Lot's wife (unnamed) is turned into a pillar of salt for turning back to see the destruction of the city's inhabitants and plants.

God tests Abraham by demanding that he sacrifice Isaac, his son (Genesis 22). As Abraham is about to lay the knife upon his son, God restrains him, promising him numberless descendants.

Isaac's son Jacob conspires to gain his elder brother Esau's birthright, but the brothers ultimately reconcile (Genesis 25–33). In Genesis 32:22–32, Jacob meets and wrestles with someone, a man, angel or God, who blesses him and gives him the name Israel.

Joseph (Genesis 37–50), Jacob's favorite son, is sold into slavery in Egypt by his jealous brothers. Joseph prospers after hardship, with God's guidance, and saves his family from starvation.

=== Book of Exodus and Book of Leviticus ===
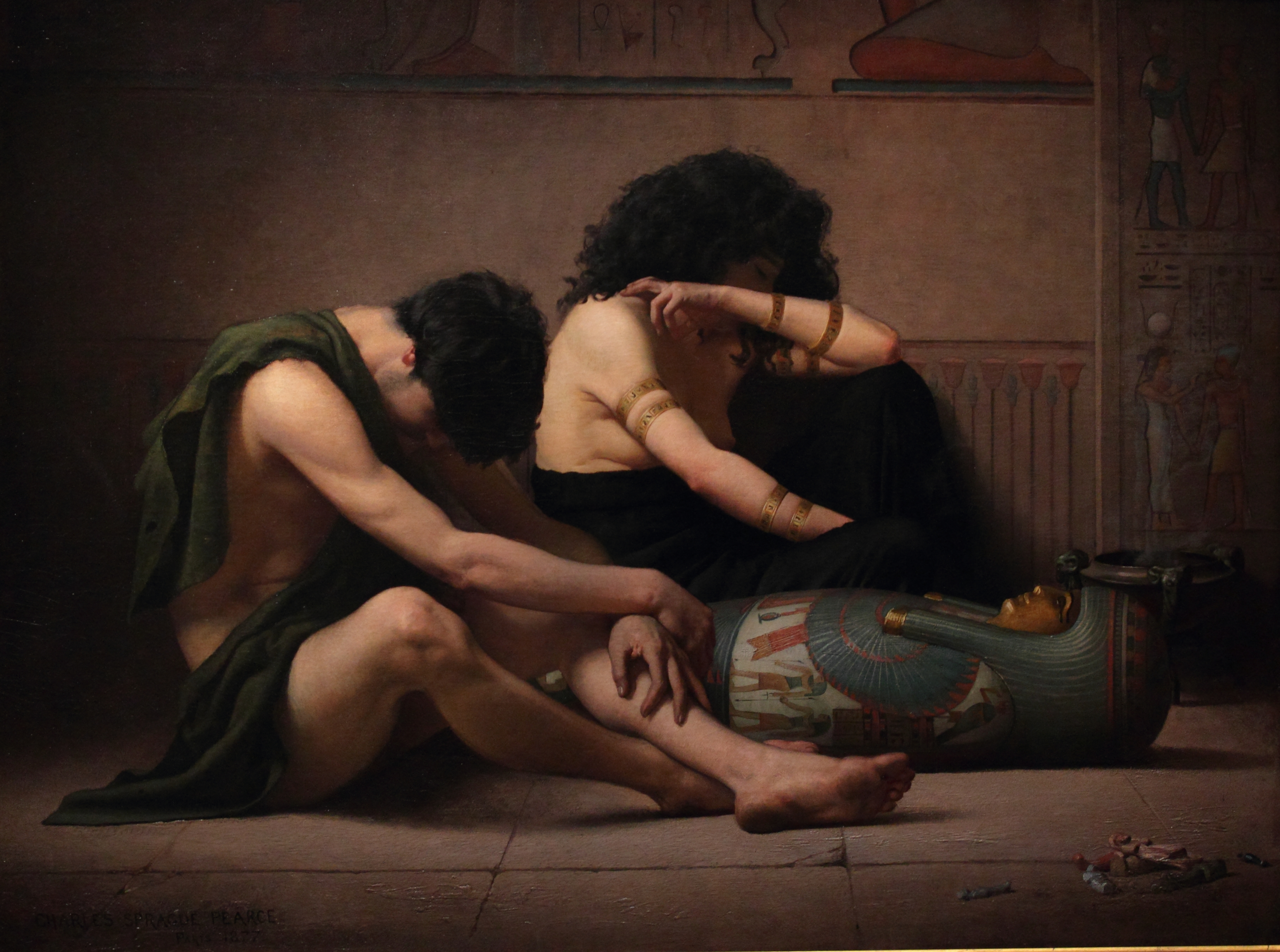
Lamentations over the Death of the First-Born of Egypt by Charles Sprague Pearce (1877)

A new pharaoh sees that the Israelites in Egypt have become many and fears they might aid Egypt's enemies (Exodus 1:8–10). The Egyptians make the Israelites "serve with rigour" and their lives become "bitter with hard service". Pharaoh orders two Hebrew midwives, Shiphrah and Puah, to kill the newborn sons of Hebrew women, but they disobey him. Pharaoh then orders his people to drown these children.

Moses, a Hebrew raised by Pharaoh's daughter, one day encounters an Egyptian beating a Hebrew. He slays the Egyptian and flees Egypt. God hears the plight of the Israelites and sends Moses back to Egypt to bring them out of that land to Canaan. At one point during the journey back, God intends to kill Moses, but he is saved by his wife Zipporah (Exodus 2–4).

Moses asks Pharaoh to release the Israelites, but Pharaoh responds by demanding more work from them. Moses repeats his request several times as the Plagues of Egypt afflict the Egyptians, but Pharaoh refuses until the tenth plague, when God kills all firstborn people and cattle in Egypt, apart from those of the Israelites, who are protected. The biblical author writes that God hardened Pharaoh's heart (Exodus 7:3–4; 9:12), and that Pharaoh hardened his own heart (Exodus 8:15, 32: 9:34), and that his heart hardened in response to the demands with no attribution (Exodus 7:13,22). The Israelites are allowed to leave, but God again hardens Pharaoh's heart, and Pharaoh changes his mind, and sends an army after them. God saves them from the army by drowning it in the Red Sea.

At Mount Sinai, God gives the Israelites the Ten Commandments and the Covenant Code (Exodus 20–23). These laws include thou shalt not kill, eye for an eye and laws about slavery and other things. Capital punishment is prescribed for some crimes. Animal sacrifice in the form of burnt offerings is mentioned, and it is prescribed that an ox that kills a person is to be stoned. The Code states that "And a stranger shalt thou not wrong, neither shalt thou oppress him; for ye were strangers in the land of Egypt." and "Ye shall not afflict any widow, or fatherless child." The Israelites promise to follow these laws (Exodus 24:3).

The Israelites break their promise by worshiping the Golden Calf. God is angered by this and intends to "consume them", but Moses persuades him not to do so. Moses is also angered, and he breaks two stone tablets with God's writing. On Moses' command, the Levites kill about three thousand people (Exodus 32).

God has Moses make new stone tablets, and gives Moses the Ritual Decalogue, which states in part "Take heed to thyself, lest thou make a covenant with the inhabitants of the land whither thou goest, lest they be for a snare in the midst of thee. But ye shall break down their altars, and dash in pieces their pillars, and ye shall cut down their Asherim" (Exodus 34).

The Book of Leviticus concerns laws for priests and sets out detailed rules for animal sacrifice. The Holiness code, Leviticus 17–26, sets out a list of prohibitions, and the punishments for breaking them. Punishments include execution, sometimes by stoning or burning.

=== Book of Numbers ===
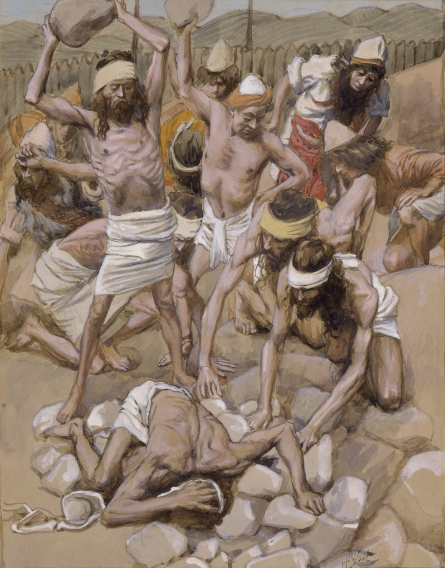
The Sabbath-breaker Stoned James Tissot c.1900

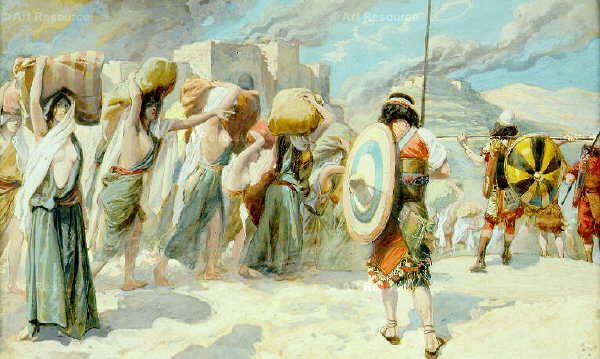
The Women of Midian Led Captive by the Hebrews James Tissot c.1900

God orders Moses to count "all that are able to go forth to war in Israel" (Numbers 1). God hears the people "speaking evil" and punishes them with fire. Moses prays, and the fire abates. God is again angered and sends "a great plague" (Numbers 11). God hears Miriam and Aaron speak against Moses, and punishes Miriam with leprosy. Moses asks God to heal her which he does (Numbers 12).

The Israelites reach the border of Canaan, but due to reports from spies they refuse to enter, and wish to return to Egypt. God is angered, and tells Moses "I will smite them with the pestilence, and destroy them, and will make of thee a nation greater and mightier than they." Moses persuades him not to, but God declares that the Israelites will now wander the wilderness for forty years before they can enter Canaan. They are attacked by Amalekites and Canaanites (Numbers 13–14). In Numbers 15, a man is found working on the Sabbath. God orders him to be killed and he is stoned.

Korah and a group of men rebel against Moses and Aaron. God destroys them (Numbers 16). The Isralites "murmur" about this, and God punishes them with a plague (Numbers 16). At Hormah, a Canaanite king fights the Israelites, and the Israelites promise God that if he gives them victory over this people, they will destroy their cities. He does and they do. The Israelites speak against God and Moses, and God sends venomous snakes that kill many of them. Moses prays for the people, and God helps them (Numbers 21).

The Israelites conquer the cities of Sihon, king of the Amorites, and they "smote him, and his sons, and all his people, until there was none left him remaining; and they possessed his land." (Numbers 21). When the diviner Balaam beats his donkey, it speaks. Balaam later prophesies on the future of the Israelite's enemies (Numbers 22–24).

Some Israelites commit harlotry with women in Moab, and sacrifice to their gods. God is angered, orders executions and sends a plague, but "the main guilt is Midian's and on Midian fell the vengeance" (Numbers 25 and 31).

God orders Moses to "Harass the Midianites, and smite them", and to again count "all that are able to go forth to war in Israel" (Numbers 25–26). The Israelites war against Midian, and "slew every male". They take captive the women and children, and take all cattle, flocks and goods as loot, and burn all cities and camps. When they return to Moses, he is angered, and commands "Now therefore kill every male among the little ones, and kill every woman that hath known man by lying with him. But all the women children, that have not known man by lying with him, keep alive for yourselves" (Numbers 31).

God tells Moses "Speak unto the children of Israel, and say unto them: When ye pass over the Jordan into the land of Canaan, then ye shall drive out all the inhabitants of the land from before you, and destroy all their figured stones, and destroy all their molten images, and demolish all their high places. And ye shall drive out the inhabitants of the land, and dwell therein; for unto you have I given the land to possess it." and "But if ye will not drive out the inhabitants of the land from before you, then shall those that ye let remain of them be as thorns in your eyes, and as pricks in your sides, and they shall harass you in the land wherein ye dwell. And it shall come to pass, that as I thought to do unto them, so will I do unto you" (Numbers 33).

=== Book of Deuteronomy ===
Deuteronomy begins with a review of previous stories, including a battle between the Israelites and the Amorites (Deuteronomy 1:41–44), and the destruction of Rephaim by the Ammonites with Yahweh's help (2:21), along with similar other displacements. Deuteronomy 2:31–37 records the complete extermination of the people ruled by Sihon king of Heshbon. Similar treatment, at Yahweh's command, was given to the people under Og king of Bashan. Moses also recounts how God destroyed the followers of Baal-Peor, and threatens to destroy the Israelites if they return to idolatry. Similar threats of destruction for disobedience, or idolatry more specifically, can be found in Deuteronomy 6, 8, 11. On the other hand, God promises that if his people obey him, he will protect them from the diseases the surrounding nations suffer from and give them victory in fighting their enemies in Deuteronomy 6, 7 and 11.

Deuteronomy provides legislation to protect perpetrators of unintentional homicide from revenge killings (4, 19). The Ten Commandments prohibit murder (5:17). Scholars do not agree on the theme of Deuteronomy 7, but part of that theme includes the command the Canaanites must be cleared from the land for Israel to maintain her purity. The nations listed were all larger and stronger than Israel. Deuteronomy 7:24 uses the Hebrew abad (אֲבַדְ) when saying "you shall make their name perish from under heaven…" Chapter 9:3 says God will destroy Israel's enemies. Chapter 9 reminds the Israelites of their rebellious nature using Exodus 32:11–14 when Yahweh became angry at Israelite disobedience and intended to destroy them, but was dissuaded by Moses.

The terms gazal (rob) and asaq (oppress) are frequently used in combination to describe the human violence of taking/robbing/plundering as oppression of the poor which may or may not include physical, verbal or other types of harm. They are also used both separately and in combination throughout the remainder of the Hebrew Bible describing robbing the poor (Isaiah 3:14, 10:2; Jeremiah 22:3; Micah 2:2, 3:2; Malachi 1:3), withholding the wages of a hired person (cf. Deuteronomy 24:14), political oppression (Hosea 12:7), charging oppressive interest (Ezekiel 22:12), and oppressing the outsider in their midst (Ezekiel 22:7) as acts of violence.

Deuteronomy 12 opens with commands to destroy the Canaanite religion. Verses 4 and 31 explain why: "Pagan worship involved practices that were detestable to God and incompatible with his character" such as the practice of burning sons and daughters as offerings. Deuteronomy 13 presents the dangers of idolatry and foreign relations, insisting that those who advocate the worship of Canaanite deities must be killed, and that a town that worships them must be entirely exterminated, including its livestock. Deuteronomy 14 forbids self-mutilation. Deuteronomy 17 punishes anyone who worships a deity besides Yahweh, or a feature of the natural world as divine, with stoning to death, and likewise imposes the death penalty on anyone who disobeys the judicial decision of a priest.

Deuteronomy 19 imposes the death penalty for premeditated murder, establishes cities of refuge, and also imposes the lex talionis: "life for life, eye for eye, tooth for tooth, hand for hand, foot for foot" thereby limiting vengeance (verse 21, NRSV). Deuteronomy 20 regulates warfare, allowing for various exemptions from military service, and mandating that the first act of fighting any city that is far away must be an offer of peace. If peace is refused, it must be sieged and all males put to the sword; "women, children, livestock, and whatever else is in the city — all its spoil" — may be taken as plunder and kept. Any city within the specified inheritance are to be completely exterminated: "…you shall not leave alive anything that breathes. But you shall utterly destroy (ha-harem taharimem) them, the Hittite and the Amorite, the Canaanite and the Perizzite, the Hivite and the Jebusite, as the Lord your God has commanded you…" exempting only the fruit trees.

Deuteronomy 21 commands the use of sacrifices to atone unsolved murders, and mandates a month-long period of mourning before an Israelite warrior can marry a female captive. If the marriage doesn't work out, she is to go free without restriction. It also mandates the stoning to death of grown rebellious children who are gluttons and drunkards to "purge the evil" from among the people. Deuteronomy 22 orders the killing of women who cannot prove that they were virgins on their wedding night, and of both the man and woman when a man sleeps with another man's wife. It also mandates the death penalty for a man who has sexual relations with a betrothed virgin, and of the virgin if she does not cry out for help when raped.

Deuteronomy 24 imposes the death penalty for the kidnapping of a fellow Israelite, and forbids putting parents to death for crimes committed by their children, and vice versa. Deuteronomy 25 allows for judges to have people punished in legal disputes by flogging, but limits the number of strikes to forty. "If men get into a fight with one another, and the wife of one intervenes to rescue her husband from the grip of his opponent by reaching out and seizing his genitals, you shall cut off her hand; show no pity" (25:11–12), although rabbinical scholars debate whether this is to be interpreted as a requirement for self defense, or a metaphor for financial liability. This chapter also urges the extermination of the Amalekites (verses 17–19). Deuteronomy 28 contains blessing and curses: blessing, including the defeat of Israel's enemies, if Israel obeys; and curses if Israel disobeys. These curses include disease, famine, defeat and death in warfare, insanity, abuse and robbery, enslavement, and cannibalism due to extreme hunger. Similar threats appear in the following chapter (29) and in Deuteronomy 32.

=== Book of Joshua ===
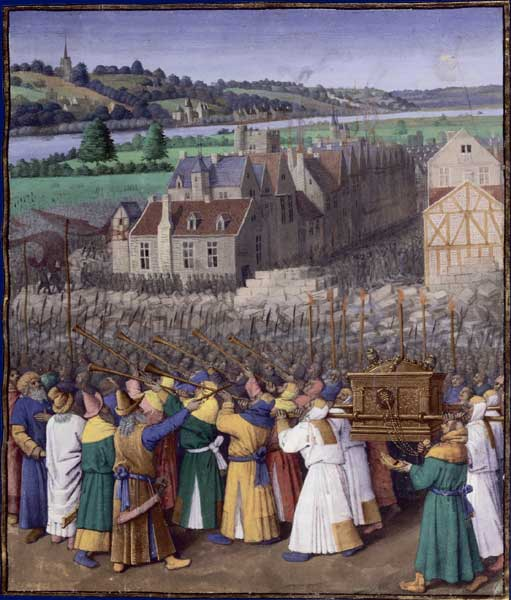
The Taking of Jericho (Jean Fouquet, c.1452–1460)

God commands Joshua to take possession of Canaan (Joshua 1). Joshua conquers a total of 31 city states ruled by kings as listed in chapter 12 of Joshua. The Jericho-woman Rahab aids two Israelite spies, and she and her family are promised to be spared in the coming conquest if they hang a scarlet thread in the window (Joshua 2). The Israelites enter Canaan, carrying with them the Ark of the Covenant. Joshua conquers the city of Jericho. The city is burned, and apart from Rahab's family, every person, ox, sheep and donkey is killed (Joshua 6). Joshua attempts to capture the city of Ai, but fails (Joshua 7). A second attempt, advised by God, succeeds. The city is set on fire and all the inhabitants are killed (Joshua 8).

Several kings ally together to fight the Israelites. The people of Gibeon, learning of the city's destruction, tricks the Israelites into a peace-treaty. When Joshua learns of the trickery, he curses the Gibeonites (Joshua 9). When the king of Jerusalem hears of the treaty, he and several other kings attack Gibeon, who then call on Joshua for help. God attacks Joshua's enemies with hailstones, the Israelites are victorious, and the enemy kings are captured. Joshua goes on to conquer more cities but never completes the conquest (Joshua 10).

More kings gather to fight the Israelites. The Israelites defeat and kill them all. Joshua 11 commands the hamstringing of horses.

Joshua finishes most of the conquest of Canaan, with the exception of Gibeon and possibly some Canaanites and Amelakites: "For it was of the LORD to harden their hearts, to come against Israel in battle, that they might be utterly destroyed, that they might have no favour, but that they might be destroyed, as the LORD commanded Moses." "And the land had rest from war" (Joshua 11).

The tribe of Manasseh is given cities with Canaanites who they are unable to drive out, but Joshua tells them that in due course they will be able to do so (Joshua 17:12-13,18).

In Joshua 20, God tells Joshua to assign Cities of Refuge, so that "the manslayer that killeth any person through error and unawares may flee thither; and they shall be unto you for a refuge from the avenger of blood."

=== Book of Judges ===
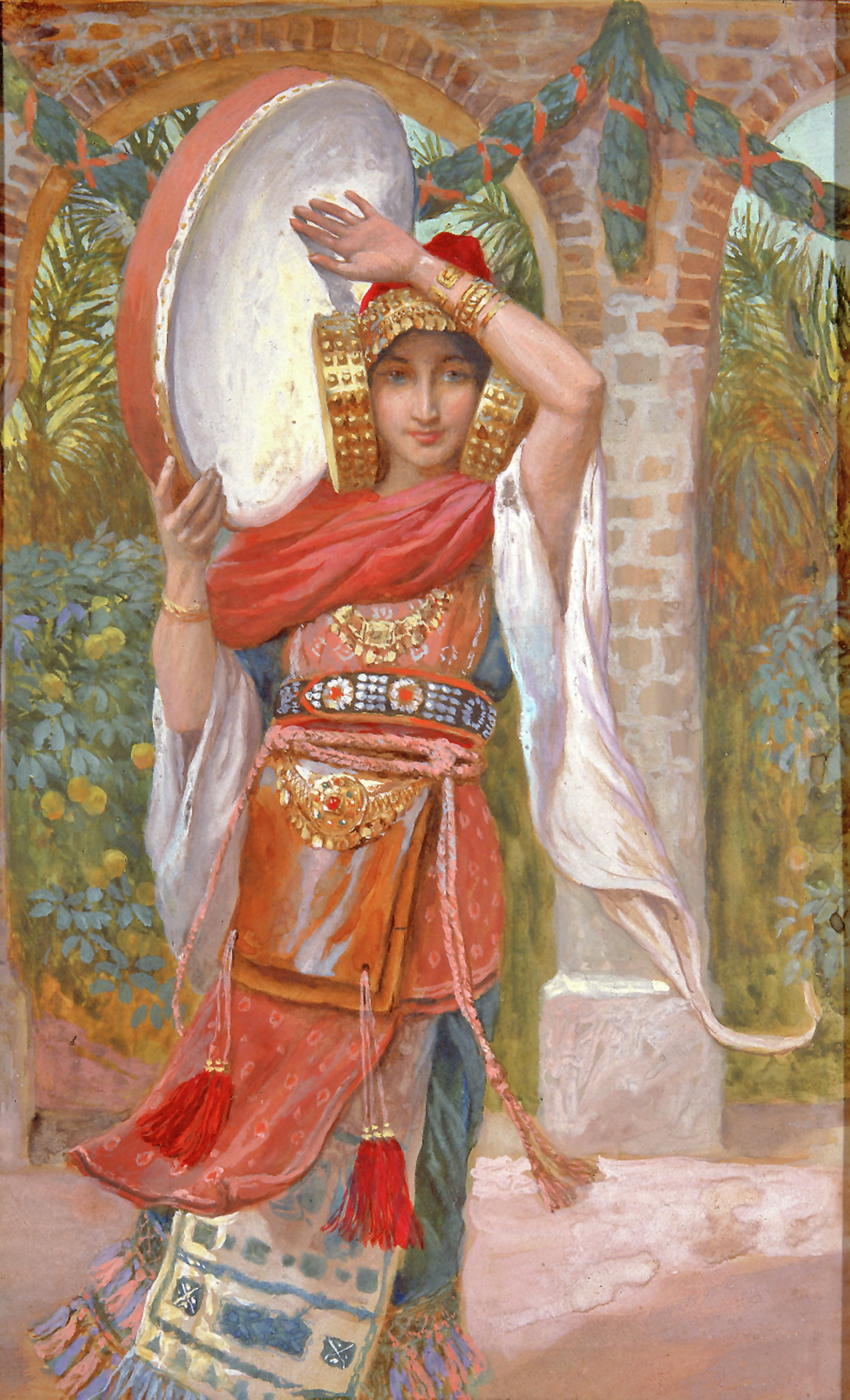
Jephthah's Daughter, c. 1896–1902, by James Jacques Joseph Tissot (1836–1902) or follower, gouache on board, at the Jewish Museum, New York

The Book of Judges contains a number of violent incidents. There is a graphic description of the assassination of the Moabite King Eglon, who defecates while rolls of his fat suck in the blade used to kill him (Judges 3:22). Later on, Jael hammers a tent peg into an enemy commander's head while he slept after fleeing from a battle (Judges 4:21). During a time of conflict with Ammon, Jephthah makes a vow to God that he will sacrifice whatever comes first out of the house and ends up sacrificing his own daughter (Judges 11). Towards the end of the book, an unnamed Levite's concubine is raped, and dies shortly afterwards. The Levite dismembers her, and has parts of her body distributed across Israel to inform people about what happened (Judges 19:29). This triggers a civil war between the Benjamites and the Israelites that kills thousands of people.

=== Books of Samuel ===
In the Books of Samuel, The Israelites war with the Philistines and are defeated at the Battle of Aphek. The Philistines capture the Ark of the Covenant, but God makes his displeasure known, and they later return it. The ark arrives at Beth-shemesh, where God slays fifty thousand men for gazing upon it (1 Samuel 6). Samuel urges Israel's people to "put away the foreign gods" and serve only God, which they do. The Philistines attack and are defeated at Mizpah.

Saul is made king of Israel and wars with many enemies. Samuel commands Saul "Now go and smite Amalek, and utterly destroy all that they have, and spare them not; but slay both man and woman, infant and suckling, ox and sheep, camel and ass" (1 Samuel 15:3). Saul does not fully obey, which angers God and Samuel. Samuel kills the captured Agag, king of the Amalekites.

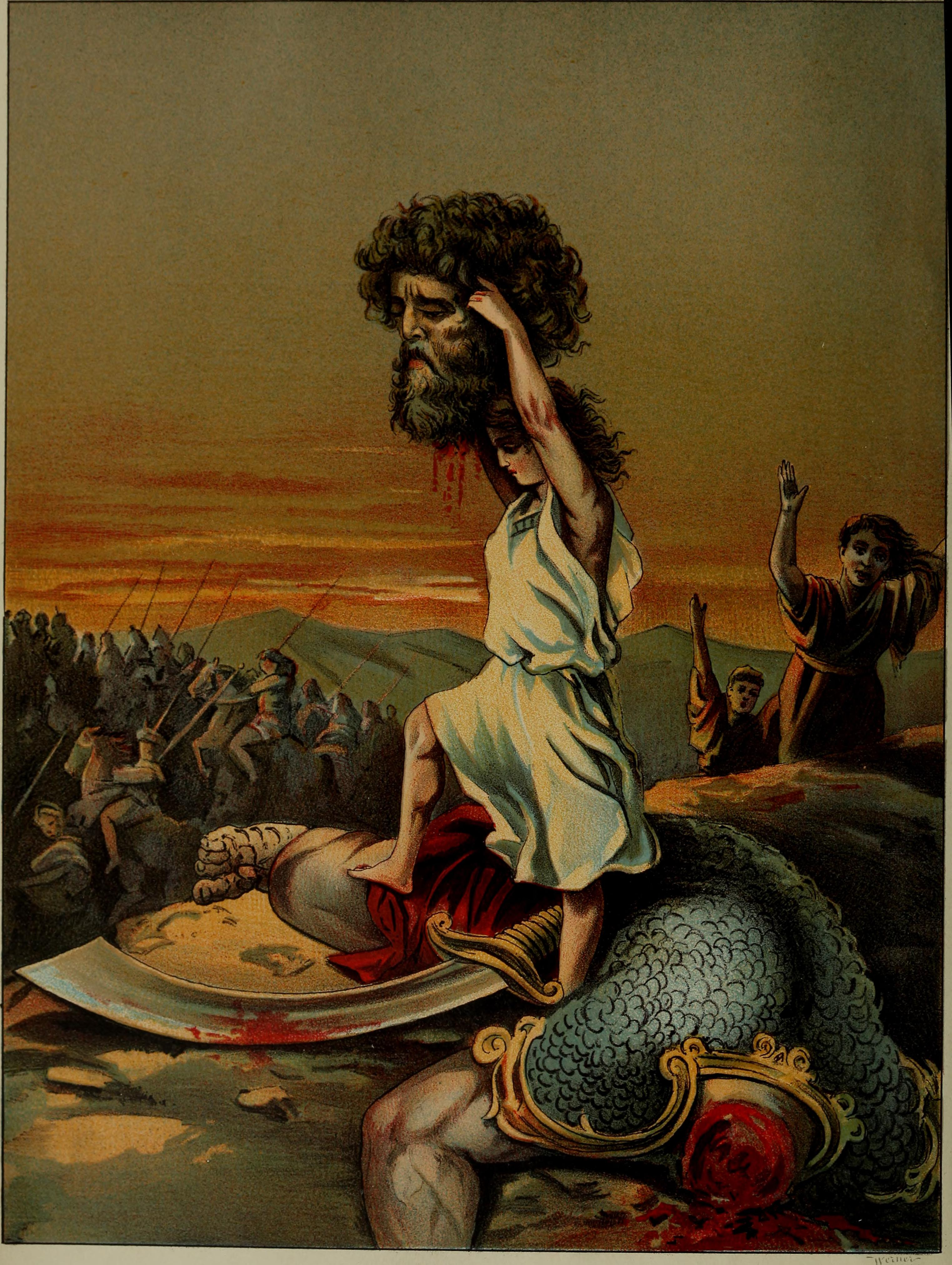
David raises the head of Goliath. Josephine Pollard (1899)

David, anointed king in secret (1 Samuel 16), comes into Saul's service and "loved him greatly". The Philistines attack Israel, David slays their champion Goliath, and they flee. David becomes popular, which makes Saul fear him and plot his death. David and Saul's daughter Michal wish to marry, and Saul asks for a dowry of one hundred foreskins of the Philistines. David delivers two hundred, and becomes the king's son-in-law (1 Samuel 18). Saul again wishes David dead, but they are reconciled by Saul's son Jonathan.

War comes again, David is victorious. Saul again wants to kill David, and he flees with help from his wife. Saul searches for him and slays the inhabitants of the city Nob for aiding David (1 Samuel 22). David defeats the Philistines at Keilah, then flees the city pursued by Saul (1 Samuel 22). David and Saul reconcile. David seeks refuge with Achish, king of Gath, and claims he is raiding Judah but is actually raiding and killing in other places (1 Samuel 27). The Philistines begin a war against Saul. David's wives Ahinoam and Abigail are taken in a raid on Ziklag, but he rescue them (1 Samuel 30). The men of Israel flee before the Philistines, and three of Saul's sons are slain. Saul asks his armour-bearer to kill him, but is refused, so he takes his own life. The armour-bearer also takes his own life. Saul's body is beheaded and fastened to a city-wall by the victorious Philistines, but it is retaken by inhabitants of Jabesh-Gilead (1 Samuel 31).

A man tells David of Saul's death and that he himself killed Saul. David has him killed (2 Samuel 1). A long war starts between David and Saul's son Ish-bosheth (2 Samuel 3). David demands and is granted the return of his first wife Michal, despite the public grief of her new husband Palti. Two men assassinate Ish-bosheth, and David has them killed (2 Samuel 4). David wars victoriously with the Philistines. While transporting the Ark of the Covenant to Jerusalem, a man called Uzzah carelessly touches it and is killed by God (2 Samuel 6).

David defeats and plunders several enemies, and "executed justice and righteousness unto all his people." (2 Samuel 8). The children of Ammon mistreat David's emissaries, and are defeated by David's army (2 Samuel 10).

In order to make Bathsheba his wife, David successfully plots the death of her husband. This displeases God, and David is told that "the sword shall never depart from thy house." God kills David's and Bathsheba's child, that was conceived during her previous marriage. She then conceives again and gives birth to Solomon. David conquers and plunders the city Rabbah (2 Samuel 11–12).

David's son Amnon rapes his half-sister Tamar. Absalom, her full brother, in return has him killed (2 Samuel 13). Absalom conspires and revolts against David. Absalom is finally defeated and dies in the Battle of the Wood of Ephraim, and David mourns him (2 Samuel 15–19). Sheba son of Bichri revolts, but is ultimately beheaded (2 Samuel 20).

In 2 Samuel 21, David has seven of Sauls sons and grandsons killed, including "the five sons of Michal the daughter of Saul", though he spares Sauls grandson Mephibosheth. More wars take place. 2 Samuel 23 names and praises several of David's warriors.

=== The Prophets and Psalms ===
The word hamas appears in the Hebrew Bible in the context of violence, but also in contexts of sin and injustice, judicial matters, structural violence, and the theodicy problem. Hamas may refer to verbal or even ethical violence. "Sometimes the word refers to extreme wickedness (Isaiah 53:9; 59:6) where physical violence may or may not be [involved]." "The term Hamas sometimes appears as a cry to God in the face of injustice (Jer. 6:7)." Exodus 23:1 and Deut. 19:16 characterize a false witness as ʿēd ḥāmas (a “violent witness”). The notion that a false witness threatens life and well-being appears in fuller form in the Psalter." Creach writes that the prophet "Amos 1:3–2:3 uses 'akal' to indict Israel’s neighbors for various acts of cruelty during war (e.g., the Ammonites “ripped open pregnant women in Gilead in order to enlarge their territory”; 1:13) and uses those war crimes of surrounding peoples to draw a parallel with Israel's mistreatment of the poor, thus elevating economic injustice to the level of war crimes." (2:6–8).

Characters like Phinehas (Num. 25), Elijah (1 kg. 18:39–40; 2 kg. 1), and Elisha (2 kg. 2:23–25; 9) killed, ordered killing, participated in killing and foretold killing in the name of God. Elijah called down fire from Heaven to consume the sacrifice, then followed this display of God's power by catching and personally killing all the prophets of Baal; he twice called the fire down from heaven to consume the Captain and the fifty men with him sent by the King (2 Kings 1:10); Elisha called bears from the woods to maul the 42 "youths" who mocked him, and visited leprosy on Gehazi his deceitful servant, (2 Kings 5:27); Amos pronounces judgment on the nations including Israel offering a vision of Divine judgment that includes a swarm of locusts and divine fire; Ezekiel said, "The word of the Lord came to me" repeatedly pronouncing violent judgment against the nations and Israel, and a feminist interpretation of the book of Nahum speaks of the "rape" of Ninevah, the book's "fascination with war, and the glee with which it calls for revenge."

As a response to the violence of the wicked, numerous psalms call on God to bring vengeance on one's personal enemies, for example Ps. 109 calls for vengeance on the entire family as "payment" to the Psalmist's accusers beginning with his children , including his wife and all his ancestors . Psalm 137 speaks against Babylon and expresses a desire to dash "their infants against the rocks".

=== New Testament ===
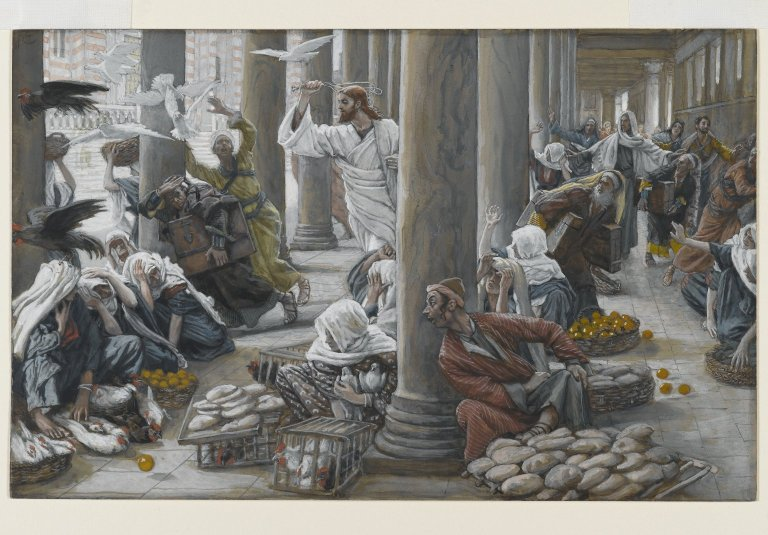
A 19th century rendition of the Cleansing of the Temple.

==== Gospels ====
In the Gospel of Matthew, Herod the Great is described as ordering the execution of all young male children in the vicinity of Bethlehem.

Matthew 10:34 and Luke 12:49–51 reference Jesus as saying he comes to bring fire or a sword. G. Stroumsa writes that these verses are sometimes interpreted as violent, but he goes on to reference Theissen as saying they are actually about conflict in the family. The cleansing of the Temple is sometimes considered to be a violent action by Jesus. There are also multiple sayings of Jesus that oppose violence, such as Turning the other cheek and the passage about Jesus and the woman taken in adultery.

The earliest detailed accounts of the killing of Jesus are contained in the four canonical gospels, with other implicit references in the New Testament epistles. All four Gospels conclude with a narrative of Jesus' arrest, initial trial at the Sandhedrin and final trial at Pilate's court, where Jesus is flogged, forced to carry his cross through Jerusalem, and then crucified. The metaphor of sacrifice is used in reference to His death, both in the Gospels and other books of the New Testament. In each Gospel these violent events are treated with more intense detail than any other portion of that Gospel's narrative. Scholars note that the reader receives an almost hour-by-hour account of what is happening.

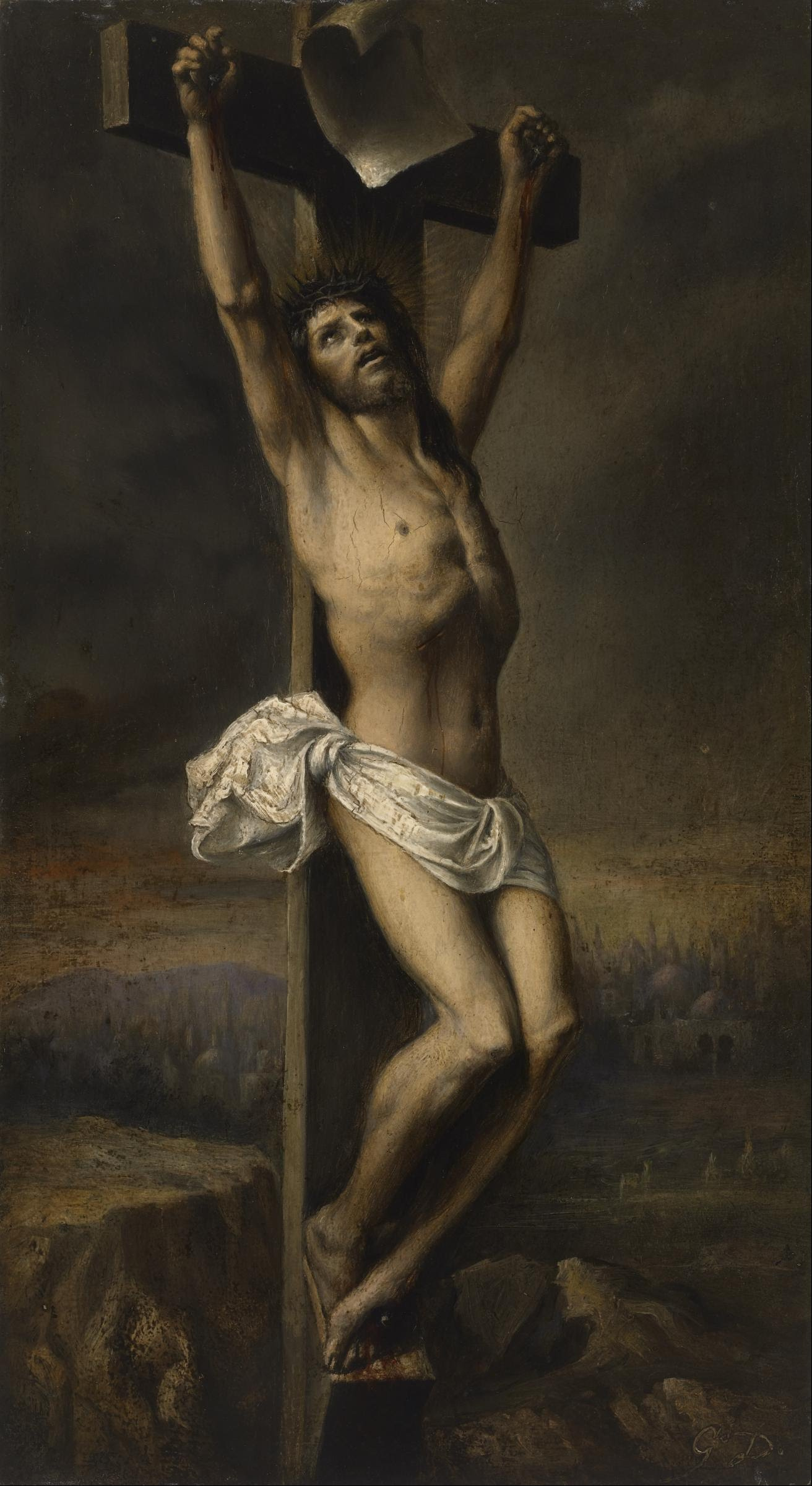
Christ on the Cross. 19th century painting by Gustave Doré

==== Apocalypse ====
The Book of Revelation is full of imagery of war, genocide, and destruction. It describes the Apocalypse, the last judgment of all the nations and people by God, which includes plagues, war, and economic collapse. Some other books of the Gospels also use apocalyptic language and forms. Scholars define this as language that "views the future as a time when divine saving and judging activity will deliver God's people out of the present evil order into a new order...This transformation will be cataclysmic and cosmic."

Whenever Jesus calls people to a new vision in light of God's impending kingdom, judgment, or a future resurrection, he is using apocalyptic speech. For example, Jesus uses apocalyptic speech in Matthew 10:15 when he says "it will be more bearable for Sodom and Gomorrah on the day of judgment than for that town," and in Mark 14:62, where he alludes to the book of Daniel with himself in the future "sitting at the right hand of God." Bailey and Vander Broek go on to say, "In the material about John the Baptizer there also appear apocalyptic images: 'the wrath to come' (Luke 3:7); 'the axe ... lying at the root of the tree' (Luke 3:9); the Coming One with 'winnowing fork ... in His hand' (Luke 3:17); and chaff burning with 'unquenchable fire' (Luke 3:17)."

Charles B. Strozier, psychoanalyst historian says: "The most troubling dimension of 'endism' is its relation to violence. ... fundamentalists generally believe... transformation can only be accomplished violently, and that the move from our time into the next requires mass death and destruction when '...this earth will be purged in the fires of God's anger, that Jesus will return, and that a new heaven and a new earth will be reborn'". The Book of Revelation has been used to justify violence and has served as an inspiration of revolutionary movements.

According to Richard Bauckham, the author of the book of Revelation addresses apocalypse with a reconfiguration of traditional Jewish eschatology that substitutes "faithful witness to the point of martyrdom for armed violence as the means of victory. Because the Lamb has won the decisive victory over evil by this means, his followers can participate in his victory only by following his path of suffering witness. Thus, Revelation repudiates apocalyptic militarism, but promotes the active participation of Christians in the divine conflict with evil".

== Theological reflections and responses ==
Texts of violence have produced a wide variety of theological responses.

=== Various views ===
Historian Paul Copan and philosopher Matthew Flannagan say the violent texts of ḥerem warfare are "hagiographic hyperbole", a kind of historical writing found in the Book of Joshua and other Near Eastern works of the same era and are not intended to be literal; they contain hyperbole, formulaic language, and literary expressions for rhetorical effect — like when sports teams use the language of “totally slaughtering” their opponents. John Gammie concurs, saying the Bible verses about "utterly destroying" the enemy are more about pure religious devotion than an actual record of killing people. Gammie references Deuteronomy 7:2-5 in which Moses presents ḥerem as a precondition for Israel to occupy the land with two stipulations: one is a statement against intermarriage (vv. 3–4), and the other concerns the destruction of the sacred objects of the residents of Canaan (v. 5) but neither involves killing. Biblical scholars such as John H. Walton and Kenneth Kitchen also concluded that violent language relating to biblical warfare was hyperbolic, based on comparisons to the language of other literary cultures.

As part of the many reflections on religious violence inspired by the Abrahamic religions that followed 9/11, John J. Collins wrote a short book called "Does the Bible Justify Violence?". In the book he reviews the passages in the Bible describing violence done by God, commanded or promised by God, and done by people, as well as how these texts have been used by religious people and governments throughout history. For example, he discusses The Exodus and the conquest of the Canaanites in the subsequent Book of Joshua, as two sides of the same coin; the Exodus story has inspired hope for millennia as well as civil rights movements; at the same time people identifying with the liberated Israel supported by God have cited the conquest to justify actions ranging from genocide of indigenous peoples to Apartheid.

Collins concludes that the Bible speaks in many voices. He writes that: "....historically people have appealed to the Bible precisely because of its presumed divine authority, which gives an aura of certitude to any position it can be shown to support -- in the phrase of Hannah Arendt, 'God-like certainty that stops all discussion.' And here, I would suggest, is the most basic connection between the Bible and violence, more basic than any command or teaching it contains....The Bible has contributed to violence in the world precisely because it has been taken to confer a degree of certitude that transcends human discussion and argumentation."

Collins, writing as a Christian scholar, also notes: "It is not unusual for Christian interpreters to claim that 'the Biblical witness to the innocent victims and the God of victims demystifies and demythologizes this sacred social order' in which violence is grounded. Such a selective reading, privileging the death of Jesus or the suffering servant, is certainly possible and even commendable, but it does not negate the force of the biblical endorsements of violence that we have been considering. The full canonical shape of the Christian Bible, for what it is worth, still concludes with the judgement scene in Revelation, in which the Lamb that was slain returns as the heavenly warrior with a sword for striking down the nations."

Regina Schwartz is among those who seek to reimagine Christianity and the Christian biblical canon in ways that reduce violence. She describes violence as arising from the ancient Israelite invention of monotheism and the ways ancient Israelites conceived of themselves in relation to that one god and to other peoples. Christians inherited this view but only in part. She writes that: "The Other, against whom Israel's identity is forged is abhorred, abject, impure, and in the "Old Testament," vast numbers of them are obliterated, while in the "New Testament," vast numbers are colonized (converted). The tying of identity to rejection runs counter to much of the drive that could be found elsewhere, both in the Bible and throughout religious myth and ritual, to forge identity through analogy, even identification....Among all the rich variety, I would categorize two broad understandings of identity in the Bible: one grounded in Negation (or scarcity) and the other in Multiplicity (or plenitude). Near the end of her book, she says: "My re-vision would produce an alternative Bible that subverts the dominant vision of violence and scarcity with an ideal of plenitude and its corollary ethical imperative of generosity. It would be a Bible embracing multiplicity instead of monotheism."

Stephen Geller notes that both the Deuteronomist and the Priestly authors working in the Axial Age were re-evaluating and reformulating their traditions, like their neighbors were, using the literary means available to them. The Deuteronomists expressed their new notions of the transcendence and power of God by means of ideas and associated laws around unity—the one-ness of God, worshipped at the one temple in Jerusalem, by one people, kept distinct from the rest of world just as God is; zealously and violently so. Likewise the Priestly author adapted the myths and rituals of the ANE and the specific traditions of the ancient Israelites to forge different meanings for blood sacrifice than their neighbors had, specifically in the elaborate and precarious rituals on the Day of Atonement when the High Priest had to enter the Holy of Holies and the presence of God; in their work the Priestly authors also attempted to express the transcendence and unity of God who is yet in a relationship with humanity with all its variable sinfulness.

In Geller's reading the blood is not magical nor is the animal just a substitute for a human sacrifice; instead blood is at once an expression of the violence of the fallen world where people kill in order to eat (unlike Eden) and the blood itself becomes a means for redemption; it is forbidden to be eaten, as a sign of restraint and recognition, and is instead offered to God, and in that action the relationship between fallen humanity and God is restored. The Priestly authors underline the importance of all this by recalling the mortal danger faced by the High Priests, through the telling of the deaths of Nadab and Abihu when God refused their "strange offering" and consumed them with fire. One result of this reformulating work, is a God with aspects of terrifying and powerful otherness; as Annie Dillard wrote in Pilgrim at Tinker Creek: "Does anyone have the foggiest idea what sort of power we so blithely invoke? Or, as I suspect, does no one believe a word of it? The churches are children playing on the floor with their chemistry sets, mixing up a batch of TNT to kill a Sunday morning. It is madness to wear ladies’ straw hats and velvet hats to church; we should all be wearing crash helmets. Ushers should issue life preservers and signal flares; they should lash us to our pews. For the sleeping god may wake someday and take offense, or the waking god may draw us out to where we can never return."

According to David Clines (and contrary to his own assumptions), only 3.3% of words in the entire Hebrew Bible relate to violence (with even less being attributed to God), stating:

I repeat the statistics of words for violence I mentioned at the beginning of the paper: so far I have identified 10,033 occurrences of words for violence, of which 1,865 are in reference to the deity (18.6%). Speaking personally as a pacifist, I suppose I would prefer it if there were no references to violence in the Hebrew Bible at all. And I can admit that when I began this research I expected to be somewhat shocked by what I would uncover. But now that I am so far along in the research, I find the question arising in my mind is, But is it a big number? Let us recall that the Hebrew Bible contains some 303,500 words. The 10,033 occurrences are therefore 3.3% of the whole Hebrew Bible. Is that a big number? And does it seem such a big number if we put the result in this way: almost 97% of the Hebrew Bible is non-violent (in the senses I have described in this paper)?

==== Catholic Exegesis ====
In Verbum Domini, Pope Benedict XVI writes that passages in the Bible which contain "violence and immorality" should be read in the context when they were written and in light of the gospel, noting that biblical revelation is deeply rooted in history and that God's plan is accomplished slowly, in stages, and despite human resistance.

Revelation is suited to the cultural and moral level of distant times and thus describes facts and customs, such as cheating and trickery, and acts of violence and massacre, without explicitly denouncing the immorality of such things. This can be explained by the historical context, yet it can cause the modern reader to be taken aback, especially if he or she fails to take account of the many “dark” deeds carried out down the centuries, and also in our own day. In the Old Testament, the preaching of the prophets vigorously challenged every kind of injustice and violence, whether collective or individual, and thus became God’s way of training his people in preparation for the Gospel. So it would be a mistake to neglect those passages of Scripture that strike us as problematic. Rather, we should be aware that the correct interpretation of these passages requires a degree of expertise, acquired through a training that interprets the texts in their historical-literary context and within the Christian perspective which has as its ultimate hermeneutical key “the Gospel and the new commandment of Jesus Christ brought about in the paschal mystery”.

==== Others ====
Evan Fales, Professor of Philosophy, calls the doctrine of substitutionary atonement that some Christians use to understand the crucifixion of Jesus, "psychologically pernicious" and "morally indefensible". Fales founds his argument on John Locke’s statement that revelation must conform to our understanding. Philosopher and Professor Alvin Plantinga says this rests upon seeing God as a kind of specially talented human being.

Historian Philip Jenkins (quoting Phyllis Trible) says the Bible is filled with "texts of terror" but he also asserts these texts are not to be taken literally. Jenkins says eighth century BCE historians added them to embellish their ancestral history and get readers' attention.

Old Testament scholar Ellen Davis is concerned by what she calls a "shallow reading" of Scripture, particularly of 'Old Testament' texts concerning violence, which she defines as a "reading of what we think we already know instead of an attempt to dig deeper for new insights and revelations." She says these difficult texts typically have internal correctives that support an educative reading.

=== The problem of evil ===
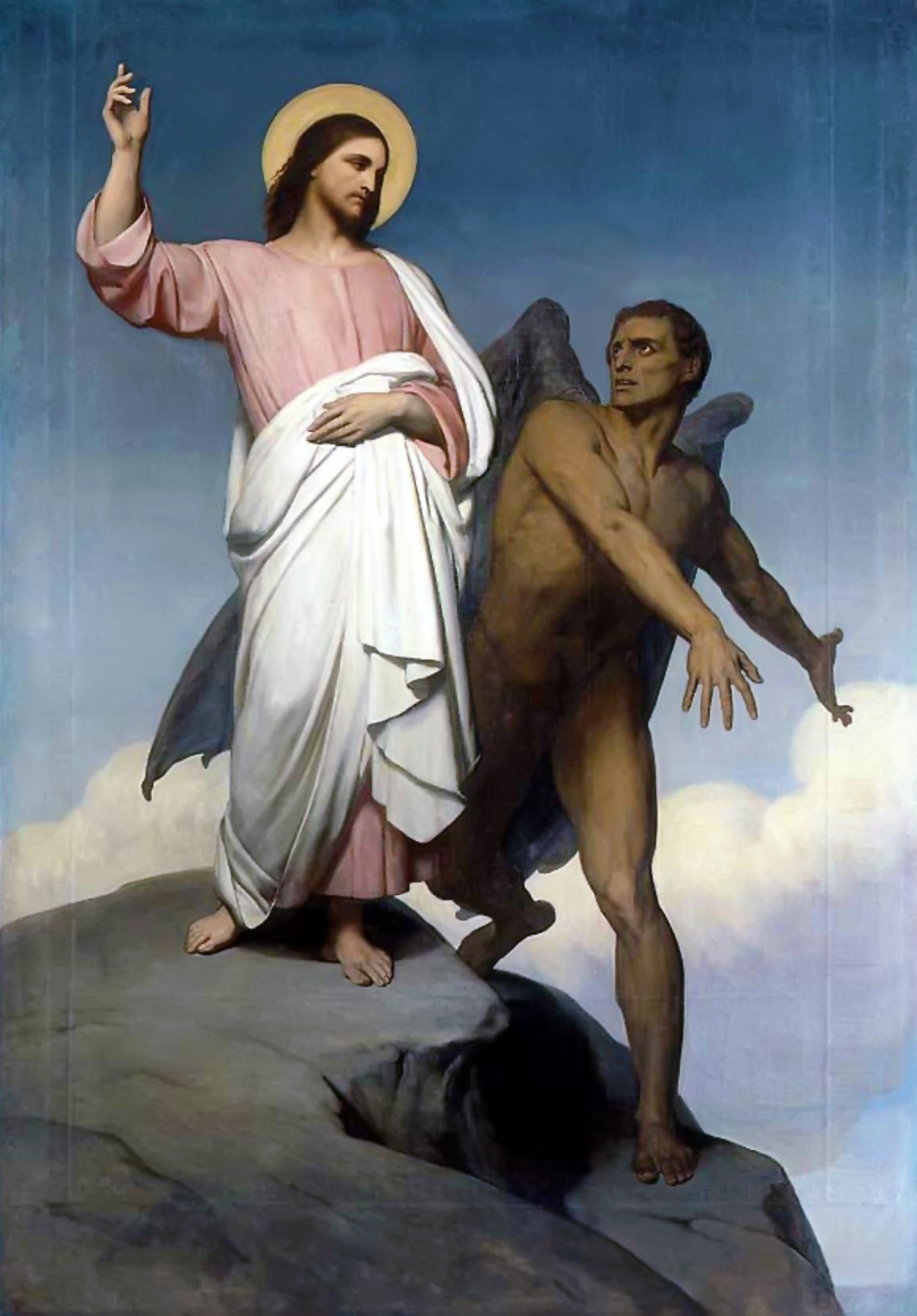
The devil, in opposition to the will of God, represents evil and tempts Christ, the personification of the character and will of God. Ary Scheffer, 1854.

Discussions of the Bible and violence often lead to discussions of theodicy - the question of how evil can persist in the world if God is all-powerful, all-knowing, and good. Philosopher David Hume summarizes: "Is God willing to prevent evil, but not able? Then he is not omnipotent. Is he able, but not willing? Then he is malevolent. Is he both able and willing? Then from whence comes evil?"

The first systematic reflections on the problem of evil by Jewish philosophers is traceable only in the medieval period. The ancient books of the Hebrew Bible do not show an awareness of the theological problem of evil, and even most later biblical scholars did not touch the question of the problem of evil. While there are secular responses to the problem, the problem of evil is primarily a challenge to Christianity.

The Christian response is based on an understanding of evil as limited; it cannot be correctly understood on a simple scale of pleasure vs. pain, since the National Institute of medicine says pain is essential for survival. There are three main types of response. The freewill defense by Alvin Plantinga assumes that a world containing creatures who are significantly free is an innately more valuable world than one containing no free creatures, and that God could not have made a world containing complexity and freedom without including the possibility of evil and suffering. The soul-making theodicy advocated by John Hick says God allows the evil of suffering because it produces good in its results of building moral character.

Christian ethicists such as David Ray Griffin have also produced process theodicies which assert God's power and ability to influence events are, of necessity, limited by human creatures with wills of their own. In one version of this, Jon Levenson resolves the problem of evil by describing God's power not as static, but as unfolding in time.

Philosopher Eleonore Stump says the larger context of God permitting suffering for good purposes in a world where evil is real allows for such events as the killing of those intending evil and God to still be seen as good. Toby Betenson writes that "Theodicies mediate a praxis that sanctions evil". Generally, Christians ethicists do not claim to know the answer to the "Why?" of evil, pain and suffering. Alvin Plantinga stresses that this is why he does not proffer a theodicy but only a defense of the logic of theistic belief in the face of evil's reality.

=== Genesis and violence at creation ===
In 1895 Hermann Gunkel observed that most Ancient Near Eastern (ANE) creation stories contain a theogony depicting a god doing combat with other gods thus including violence in the founding of their cultures. For example, in the Babylonian creation epic Enuma Elish, the first step of creation has Marduk fighting and killing Tiamat, a chaos monster, to establish order. Kenneth A. Mathews says, "It has been typical of scholarship since Gunkel's Schöpfung und Chaos (1895) to interpret Genesis 1's subjugation of 'the deep' and division of the 'waters' as a remnant of the battle motif between Marduk and watery Tiamat, which was taken up by the Hebrew author and demythologized, [but] most contemporary scholars now see the association of the Hebrew tehôm ('deep,' 1:2) with Tiamat as superficial." "The fact [the Genesis creation account] was likely part of the last stages of the creation of the Pentateuch may indicate that the portrait of God in Gen. 1:1–2:4a was normative for those who gave the Old Testament canon its present shape. Hence, it seems that the account of God creating without violence in Gen. 1:1–2:4a “now serves as the overture to the entire Bible, dramatically relativizing the other cosmologies."

Canaanite creation stories like the Enuma Elish use very physical terms such as "tore open," "slit," "threw down," "smashed," and "severed" whereas in the Hebrew Bible, Leviathan is not so much defeated as domesticated. Theologian Christopher Hays says Hebrew stories use a term for dividing (bâdal; separate, make distinct) that is an abstract concept more reminiscent of a Mesopotamian tradition using non-violence at creation. Most modern scholars agree that "Gen. 1:1–2:4a narrates a story of God creating without violence or combat. In [the Genesis] account, the elements do not represent rival deities, and the story declares the creation “good” (Gen. 1:10, 12, 18, 21, 25, 31). What is more, in Gen. 1:1–2:4a the elements participate in the process of ordering at God's invitation (Gen. 1:9, 11, 20).” Old Testament scholar Walter Brueggemann says "God's characteristic action is to "speak"... God "calls the world into being"... "The way of God with his world is the way of language."

These stories in Genesis are not the only stories about creation in the Bible. In Proverbs 8, for example one reads of personified Wisdom being present and participant in creation. There is also what is called the "agon" (meaning struggle or combat) model of creation in Psalms 74 and Isaiah 51:9–10 in which God has victory in battle over the monsters of the sea. Historian theologian Christopher Hays says, there is similarity to the Canaanite myths in these Hebrew verses. However, he also says the differences are more pronounced than the similarities. Hays says Enuma Elish and Memphite theology are focused on a certain locale, where Genesis one does not mention a location (Isaiah 66:1); as has been noted, there is no theogeny in Genesis; and in the Canaanite stories the creators are glorified by being identified with other known deities whereas in Genesis, YHWH is glorified by the denial of other deities.

The intent of Genesis 1:1-2n concerning "creation from nothing" is disputed. Jon Levenson, writing Jewish biblical theology, asserts the creation stories in Genesis are not ex nihilo, but rather a generation of order out of chaos, similar to other ANE creation myths; the order allows life to flourish and holds back chaos which brings violence and destruction, which has never been obliterated and is always breaking back in. He finds that the writers of the Hebrew Bible referred to God's actions at creation as a statement of faith in a God who could protect and maintain them, or who could also step back and allow chaos to rush back in, as God did with the Flood. He finds that the writers of the Hebrew Bible also held up God's actions at creation as a challenge for God to act, and a challenge for themselves to work in covenant with God in the ongoing work of generating and maintaining order. In this, the Bible story is dissimilar to both the Memphite story and the Babylonian in that the Hebrew Bible says the divine gift of working with God in creation is limited to humankind, meaning, for the Hebrews, humans alone are part of God's being. This sense of honoring or empowering humankind is not in any of the Mesopotamian or Canaanite myths.

=== The Book of Judges and violence against women ===
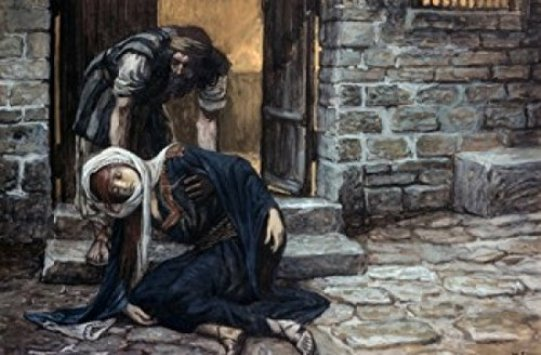
The Levite finds his concubine lying on the doorstep, James Tissot

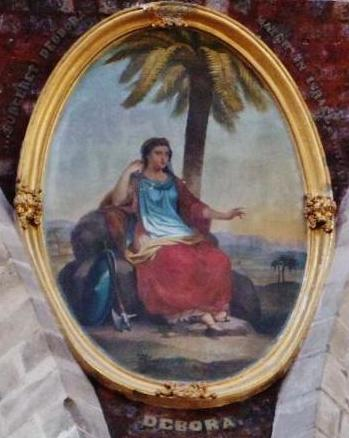
Deborah the Judge, Tenancingo, Mexico State, Mexico

Violence against women appears throughout the Old Testament. Many have attributed this to a patriarchal society, while some scholars say the problem stems from the larger context of a male dominated culture. However, women are treated in differing ways in the Bible. For example, the Book of Judges includes the judge Deborah, who was honored, as well as two of the most egregious examples in the Bible of violence against women: Jephthah’s daughter (Judg. 11:29–40) and the Levite’s concubine (Judg. 19).

Scholar author Phyllis Trible looks at these instances from the perspective of the victim, thus making their pathos palpable, underlining their human reality and the tragedy of their stories. Some feminist critiques of Judges say the Bible gives tacit approval to violence against women by not speaking out against these acts.

O'Connor says women in the Old Testament generally serve as points of reference for the larger story, yet the book of Judges abounds with stories where women play the main role. O'Connor explains the significance of this, saying: "The period between the death of Joshua and the anointing of Saul...was a period of uncertainty and danger... lack of human leadership is viewed as disastrous, for when "every one does what is right in their own eyes, the results are awful".

Beginning with the larger context, the decline of Israel during this period can be traced by following the deteriorating status of women and the violence done to them. The promise of life in the land turns into chaos and violence. The biblical authors see this as the effect of the absence of authority such as a king (Judges 21:25): violence against women occurs when government fails and social upheaval occurs.

=== Non-violence and Shalom ===
The term for peace in the Hebrew Bible is SH-L-M. It is used to describe prophetic vision and ideal conditions, and theologians have built on passages referencing it to advocate for various forms of social justice.

=== The violence of Hell ===
The concept of hell as a place of punishment in the afterlife arose in Second Temple Judaism and was further developed in the Christian tradition. Judaism subsequently moved away from the idea of an afterlife, yet there are Hebrew Bible verses indicating early Jewish thought did contain some belief in one. For example, Isaiah 26:14 which is part of proto-Isaiah (chapters 1–39), speaks of "the dead who live no more" as being "punished and destroyed". And Daniel 12:2–3, which is generally believed to date to the second century BCE, asserts "Many of those who sleep in the dust of the ground will awake, these to everlasting life, but the others to disgrace and everlasting contempt." The word Sheol, seen as the resting place of departed spirits, appears 65 times in the Hebrew Bible, and the term "Tartaros" appears frequently in Jewish apocalyptic literature where it refers to a place where the wicked are punished. More evidence comes from Second Maccabees, written in the second century BCE, containing the dying words of seven pious Jewish brothers and their mother who have full confidence in their physical resurrection by Yahweh. By the first century CE, friction between the Sadducees and the Pharisees over this issue is documented by both the New Testament writers and Josephus giving evidence of its presence in Jewish thought.

In the New Testament there are three words translated in English as Hell: the Greek word hades, which is a general equivalent of the Hebrew Sheol, is used to identify the temporary place of the unsaved after death, and is not used in relationship to the lake of fire or eternal punishment. Secondly, there is gehenna which is uniformly translated Hell and refers to eternal punishment; a literal interpretation includes violence. There is one occurrence of tartaros which appears in 2 Peter 2:4 and is considered equivalent to gehenna. All the references to gehenna (except James 3:6) are spoken by Jesus himself. Jesus also taught that punishment in Hell would be by degrees (an idea Dante later developed) with one servant receiving a lighter beating than others, hypocrites receiving more condemnation than others, and so on.

Different Greek terms and their differing translation and interpretation have produced controversy over the nature of Hell in Christian theology. In a famous excerpt from the book William Barclay: A Spiritual Autobiography titled "I am a convinced universalist", William Barclay argues that the Greek adjective aionios translated from Matthew 25:46 as eternal has been misapplied to the wrong noun as it can only properly be used to describe God not punishment. Steve Gregg quotes Douglas Jacoby as arguing that most modern exegetes reject the view aionios always represents an infinity in time. Josephus used the term to describe an imprisonment that lasted three years.

As a result, Charles Seymour, philosopher at Notre Dames, asserts there are multiple views and differing doctrines of Hell within Christianity. For example, Aquinas' Hell differs from the Hell described by C. S. Lewis in the Great Divorce. Lewis's Hell is filled only with those who have chosen it rather than repent and submit to God. Jerry Walls in his book Hell: The logic of damnation, looks at the 'traditional popular view', the 'modified orthodox view', the 'traditional Calvinist view', and others". Miroslav Volf justifies the doctrine of final judgment by saying it provides a necessary restraint on human violence. Tim Keller says it is right to be angry when someone brings injustice or violence to those we love and therefore a loving God can be filled with wrath because of love, not in spite of it. Oliver O'Donovan argues that without the judgment of God we would never see the love in redemption.

According to Steve Gregg, there are three primary views of Hell in Christianity. First is Hell as the righteous condemnation of rebels and evildoers like Hitler where God will not mitigate the misery by any degree. This doctrine of hell as a place of never ending punishment is attributed to Augustine in the fourth century and later to Aquinas. For another group, Hell is simply death where the unbeliever dies and is not revived. Others interpret Hell as a temporary place where sin is purged through suffering that ultimately produces "universal salvation".

Universal salvation was the view of the Eastern churches before 500 CE and of many of the early church fathers. After Augustine's views were adopted as the official dogma, these early leaders of the church were condemned and excommunicated. For example, the early church father Origen [c. 184 – c. 253] "believed that after death there were many who would need prolonged instruction, the sternest discipline, even the severest punishment before they were fit for the presence of God. Origen did not eliminate Hell; he believed that some people would have to go to Heaven via Hell. He believed that even at the end of the day there would be some on whom the scars remained. Therefore, he did not believe in eternal punishment, but he did see the possibility of eternal penalty.” Origen believed this process would, in the end, produce universal salvation.

After the church decided Augustine had sufficiently proven the existence of an eternal Hell for them to adopt it as official dogma, the Synod of Constantinople met in 543, and excommunicated the long dead Origen on 15 separate charges of anathema. Alice K. Turner says "To make sure that he was properly serving his time, subsequent synods in 553, 680, 787 and 869 damned him to eternal flames over and over again. Nevertheless, Origen's ideas persisted". Richard Bauckham writes that,

"Until the nineteenth century, almost all Christian theologians taught the reality of eternal torment in Hell... Since 1800, this situation has entirely changed, and no traditional doctrine has been so widely abandoned as that of eternal punishment. Among the less conservative, universal salvation, either as hope or as dogma, is now so widely accepted that many theologians accept it virtually without argument."

=== Marcionism and supersessionism ===
As the early Christian Church began to distinguish itself from Judaism, the "Old Testament" and a portrayal of God in it as violent and unforgiving were sometimes contrasted rhetorically with certain teachings of Jesus to portray an image of God as more loving and forgiving, which was framed as a new image.

Marcion of Sinope, in the early second century, developed an early Christian dualist belief system that understood the god of the Old Testament and creator of the material universe, who he called the Demiurge, as an altogether different being than the God about whom Jesus spoke. Marcion considered Jesus' universal God of compassion and love, who looks upon humanity with benevolence and mercy, incompatible with Old Testament depictions of divinely ordained violence. Accordingly, he did not regard the Hebrew scriptures as part of his scriptural canon. Marcion's teaching was repudiated by Tertullian in five treatises titled "Against Marcion" and Marcion was ultimately excommunicated by the Church.

==== Supersessionism ====
According to Michael Vlach, "It is undeniable that anti-Jewish bias has often gone hand-in-hand with the supersessionist view."

Supersessionist thought is defined by "two core beliefs: (1) that the nation of Israel has forfeited its status as the people of God through disobedience; and (2) the New Testament church has therefore become the true Israel and inheritor of the promises made to the nation of Israel." It has three forms: punitive, economic or structural supersessionism. Punitive supersessionism is the 'hard' form of supersessionism, and is seen as punishment from God. Economic supersessionism is a moderate form concerning God's economy: his plan in history to transfer the role of the "people of God" from an ethnic group to a universal group. The third form involves the New Testament having priority over the Old Testament by ignoring or replacing the original meaning of Old Testament passages. For example, within the early church, the rise of the use of Greek philosophical interpretation and allegory allowed inferences to be drawn such as the one Tertullian drew when he interpreted the statement "the older will serve the younger," (concerning the twin sons of Isaac and Rebekah (Genesis 25.23)), allegorically to mean that Israel would serve the church.

There is no agreement on when supersessionism began. Tracing the roots of supersessionism to the New Testament is problematic since "there is no consensus" that supersessionism is a biblical doctrine at all. Vlatch says one's position on this is determined more by one's beginning assumptions than it is by any biblical hermeneutic. Scholars such as W. C. Kaiser Jr. see the fourth century, after Constantine, as supersessionism's true beginning, because that is when a shift in Christian thought on eschatology took place. The church took its universally held traditional interpretation of Revelation 20:4-6 which is called Millennialism, and its hope of the thousand-year reign of the Messiah on earth, centered in Jerusalem, ruling with the redeemed Israel, and replaced it with a "historicized and allegorized version, that set up the church" as the metaphorical Israel instead.

Many Jewish writers trace anti-semitism, and the consequences of it in World War II, to this particular doctrine among Christians. Twentieth-century Jewish civil rights leader Leonard P. Zakim asserts the accuracy of what theology professor Padraic O'Hare writes: "despite the many possible destructive consequences of supersessionism, supersessionism alone is not yet anti-semitism". John Gager makes a distinction between nineteenth century anti-Semitism and second century anti-Judaism, and many scholars agree, yet there are also many who see early anti-Judaism and later anti-Semitism as the same. Anders Gerdmar sees the development of anti-semitism as part of the paradigm shift that occurred in early modernity when the new scientific focus on the Bible and history replaced the primacy of theology and tradition. Christopher Leighton associates anti-Judaism with the origins of Christianity, and anti-semitism with "modern nationalism and racial theories".

Supersessionism has never been an official doctrine of the church, and has never been universally held. Millennialism was the traditional and more universally held view of the first two centuries, and has remained an aspect of Christian thought throughout its history. Theologian Steven D. Aguzzi says supersessionism was considered a "normative view" in the writings of the early church fathers, such as Justin, Barnabas and Origen, and has been a part of Christian thought for much of the church's history, though the early Patristic emphasis on the Jewish eschatological roots of millenarianism helped to offset the more violent forms of supersessionism. Some supersessionist Christians have sometimes focused on violence in the Hebrew Bible while ignoring or giving little attention to violence in the New Testament.

== Sociological reflections and responses ==
Jože Krašovec describes the ancient Near Eastern (ANE) context in which the stories and text of the Hebrew Bible originated, in which gods were identified with peoples, and the flourishing or destruction of a people were a reflection of the power of its god or gods. While the ancient Israelites conceived of their deity as one being in contrast to the polytheistic conception of its neighbors, they remained like other ANE peoples in considering themselves a single whole unit in relationship with god. From this foundation arose notions of the nation flourishing or failing together as a whole rather than individually, and the view that individual sin leads to communal suffering and collective punishment.

René Girard, historian, literary critic, and philosopher of social science says that, "desire is mimetic (i.e. all of our desires are borrowed from other people), that all conflict originates in mimetic desire (mimetic rivalry), that the scapegoat mechanism is the origin of sacrifice and the foundation of human culture, and religion was necessary in human evolution to control the violence that can come from mimetic rivalry, and that the Bible reveals these ideas and denounces the scapegoat mechanism."

Jacques Ellul says: "I believe that the biblical teaching is clear. It always contests political power. It incites to "counterpower," to "positive" criticism, to an irreducible dialogue (like that between king and prophet in Israel), to antistatism, to a decentralizing of the relation, to an extreme relativizing of everything political, to an anti-ideology, to a questioning of all that claims either power or dominion (in other words, of all things political)...Throughout the Old Testament we see God choosing what is weak and humble to represent him (the stammering Moses, the infant Samuel, Saul from an insignificant family, David confronting Goliath, etc.). Paul tells us that God chooses the weak things of the world to confound the mighty..."

=== Genocide ===
Because of the orders to completely destroy the enemy, several scholars have characterized certain biblical passages as divine commands to commit genocide. Examples include the story of the Amalekites (Numbers 13,14), the War against the Midianites (Numbers 31), and the battle of Jericho (Joshua 1–6). Old Testament scholar Eric Siebert considers divine violence as "violence which God is said to have perpetrated, caused, or sanctioned." Specifically, this includes (1) violence which God commits without the use of human agents (e.g., sending down fire on Sodom and Gomorrah); (2) violence God commissions, typically unbeknownst to those who are being commissioned (e.g., using Babylon to punish the people of Judah for their sins); and (3) violence which God directly commands (e.g., ordering the Israelites to wipe out the Canaanites)." For example, concerning those who worship idols, Deuteronomy 7:16 uses akal (אָכַלְ) ("consume") when saying "You must destroy (consume) all the peoples the Lord your God gives over to you…". Starting in Joshua 9, after the conquest of Ai, the battles are described as defending against attacks from Canaanite kings.

UCL historian Hans Van Wees (2010) has stated: 'The genocidal campaigns claimed for the early Israelites, however, are largely fictional: the intrinsic improbability and internal inconsistencies of the account in Joshua and its incompatibility with the stories of Judges leave little doubt about this.' In the archaeological community, the Battle of Jericho has been thoroughly studied, and the consensus of modern scholars is the battles described in the Book of Joshua are not supported by the archeological record, and are not consistent with other texts in the Bible. For example, the Book of Joshua (chapter 10) describes the total extermination of the Canaanite tribes, yet at a later time Judges 1:1-2:5 suggests the Canaanites lived on. Similarly, claims in Numbers 31 that 12,000 Israelite soldiers exterminated the entire Midianite population (except for enslaving 32,000 virgin girls) and destroyed all their towns, without suffering a single casualty, are held to be historically impossible, and should be understood as symbolic, not least because other biblical books set in later times still refer to the Midianites as an independent people, such as Judges chapters 6–8, where Gideon fights them.

Sociologists Frank Robert Chalk and Kurt Jonassohn question "the applicability of the term [genocide] to earlier periods of history, and they have also questioned the judgmental and moral loadings that have become associated with it." Since most societies of the past endured and practiced genocide, it was accepted as "being in the nature of life" because of the "coarseness and brutality" of life. Chalk and Jonassohn say the Old Testament contains cases they would consider genocide (if they were factual). However, the description of certain biblical stories as genocidal, such as with the book of Joshua, is viewed as anachronistic and not applicable to the context of the sources that were about herem and not the destruction of group identities.

Scholar Nur Masalha writes that the "genocide" of the extermination commandments has been "kept before subsequent generations" and he also writes that those commandments have also served as inspirational examples of divine support for the slaughtering of enemies. Scholar Leonard B. Glick states that Jewish fundamentalists in Israel, such as Shlomo Aviner, consider the Palestinians to be like biblical Canaanites, and that some fundamentalist leaders suggest that they "must be prepared to destroy" the Palestinians if the Palestinians do not leave the land.

Arthur Grenke quotes historian, author and scholar David Stannard: "Discussing the influence of Christian beliefs on the destruction of the Native peoples in the Americas, Stannard argues that while the New Testament's view of war is ambiguous, there is little ambiguity in the Old Testament. He points to sections in Deuteronomy in which the Israelite God, Yahweh, commanded the Israelites to utterly destroy idolaters whose land they sought to reserve for the worship of their deity (Deut 7:2, 16, and 20:16–17). ... According to Stannard, this view of war contributed to the ... destruction of the Native peoples in the Americas. It was this view that also led to the destruction of European Jewry. Accordingly, it is important to look at this particular segment of the Old Testament: it not only describes a situation when a group attempts to totally destroy other groups, it also had a major influence on shaping thought and belief systems that permitted, and even inspired, genocide.

Arie Versluis says, "...indigenous populations have also appealed to the commandment (in Deut.7) in order to justify the expulsion of their colonizers. This fact is illustrated by the example of Te Kooti...in the nineteenth century, because he viewed the Maori as the Israelites and he viewed the colonizers as the Canaanites."

Historian and author William T. Cavanaugh states that every society throughout history has contained both hawks and doves. Cavanaugh and John Gammie state that laws like those in Deuteronomy probably reflect Israel's internal struggles over differing views on issues such as the issue on how to wage war.

== See also ==
- Christianity and violence
- History of Christian thought on persecution and tolerance
- Hindu terrorism
  - Hindutva
  - Violence against Christians in India
  - Violence against Muslims in independent India
- Mormonism and violence
- Islam and violence
- Jihad
- Violence in the Quran
- Judaism and violence
- Just war theory
- Religious violence
- Religious war
- Sectarian violence
