= Screen reading =

Reading a text on a computer or smart device screen

Screen reading is the act of reading a text on a computer screen, smartphone, e-book reader, etc.

== Eye tracking ==
=== F-Pattern ===
In a 1997 study conducted by Jakob Nielsen, a web usability expert who co-founded usability consulting company Nielsen Norman Group with Donald Norman, it was discovered that generally people read 25% slower on a computer screen in comparison with a printed page. The researchers state that this is only true for when reading on an older type computer screen with a low-scanrate.

In an additional study done in 2006, Nielsen also discovered that people read Web pages in an F-shaped pattern that consists of two horizontal stripes followed by a vertical stripe. He had 232 participants fitted with eye-tracking cameras to trace their eye movements as they read online texts and webpages. The findings showed that people do not read the text on webpages word-by-word, but instead generally read horizontally across the top of the webpage, then in a second horizontal movement slightly lower on the page, and lastly scan vertically down the left side of the screen.

The Software Usability Research Laboratory at Wichita State University did a subsequent study in 2007 testing eye gaze patterns while searching versus browsing a website, and the results confirmed that users appeared to follow Nielsen's 'F' pattern while browsing and searching through text-based pages.

A group of German researchers conducted a study that examined the Web browsing behavior of 25 participants over the course of around one hundred days. The researchers concluded that "browsing is a rapidly interactive activity" and that Web pages are mostly viewed for 10 seconds or less. Nielsen analyzed this data in 2008 and found that, on average, users read 20-28% of the content on a webpage.

=== Google Golden Triangle ===
A technical report from Eyetools, DidIt and Enquiro, using search results from the Google search engine, indicated that readers primarily looked at a triangular area of the top and left side of the screen. This corresponds to the Nielsen F-shaped pattern, and was dubbed the Google Golden Triangle.

A 2014 Meditative blog showed evidence of the decline of the Golden Triangle phenomenon since 2005 as users view more search result listings than before.

== Comparisons to reading printed text ==
In comparison to reading on paper, people typically understand text slightly less well when they are reading from screens. This effect may be limited to explanations, as not be present for narrative text. People tend to overestimate how well they understand text slightly more when they read from screens. The speed of reading text is roughly the same across the two mediums.

For instance, in a 2013 study, a group of 72 high school students in Norway were randomly assigned into one of two groups: one that read using PDF files on a computer and one that used standard paper. The students were put through various tests involving reading-comprehension and vocabulary. The results indicated that those who read using the PDF files performed much worse than those reading off of a paper. A conclusion was reached that certain aspects of screen reading, such as scrolling, can impede comprehension.

However, not all experiments have concluded that reading from a digitized screen can be detrimental. The same year, another experiment was conducted on 90 undergraduates at a college in Western New York involving paper reading, computer reading, and e-book reading. Like the children in the Norwegian experiment, the students were tested for comprehension upon reading a number of passages: five focused around facts and information and the other five based on narratives. No significant difference was found between any of the different forms of reading for either type of passage. However, the researchers noted that due to the participants being college students who were accustomed to using technology, they may react differently to reading on electronic devices than older individuals.

A study conducted in 2014 by Tirza Lauterman and Rakefet Ackerman allowed subjects the option to choose between reading digitally or reading printed pages. The results found that those who chose to read digitally performed worse than those who used print. However, by practicing with PDF files, subjects that preferred to read on computers were able to overcome what researchers labeled as “screen inferiority” and managed to score just as well as paper readers, who did not improve with practice. Lauterman and Ackerman concluded that the study supported the idea that screen reading is shallower than paper reading, but that with practice the shallowness can be removed as an impediment. No conclusion has yet been reached among professionals regarding whether or not reading on a screen is significantly different than reading printed text.

== Criticism ==
Critics have voiced concerns about screen reading, though some have taken a more positive stance. Kevin Kelly believes that we are transitioning from "book fluency to screen fluency, from literacy to visuality". Anne Mangen holds that because of the materialist nature of a printed book the reader is more engaged with a text, while the opposite is true with a digital text in which the reader is engaged in a "shallower, less focused way". Nicholas Carr, author of The Shallows, says that “the ability to skim text is every bit as important as the ability to read deeply. What is… troubling, is that skimming is becoming our dominant mode of reading” (138).

== Eye strain ==
Studies have shown that prolonged exposure to computer screens can have negative effects on the eyes, causing symptoms of computer vision syndrome (CVS) that include strained eyes, blurred vision and headaches. CVS can occur when people spend more than 3 hours per day using screens. Symptoms of CVS are common: approximately two-thirds of people report experiencing at least one of them.

== See also ==
- Computer literacy
