= List of Hebrew Bible events =

The Hebrew Bible is the canonical collection of Hebrew scriptures and is the textual source for the Christian Old Testament. In addition to religious instruction, the collection chronicles a series of events that explain the origins and travels of the Hebrew people in the ancient Near East. The historicity of the collection of scriptures is a source of ongoing debate.

The events of the Hebrew Bible can be subdivided into 3 main sections: the Torah (instruction), the Nevi'im (prophets), and the Ketuvim (writings).

The events listed in the Torah start with the creation of the universe and conclude with transfer of authority from Moses to Joshua and the death of Moses.

The Nevi'im is authored by leading Hebrew prophets from the time Joshua leads the Hebrew people into Canaan until some time after the return of Hebrew remnant from Babylonian exile. In addition to recorded significant contemporary military and political events, many future events are predicted.

The Ketuvim recounts events over the same timeline as the Nevi'im, but from the point of view of secular leaders and lesser prophets.

== Torah ==
=== Genesis ===
- Genesis creation narrative
- Adam and Eve
- Fall of man
- Cain and Abel
- Generations of Adam
- Nephilim
- Genesis flood narrative
- Noah's Covenant
- Curse of Ham
- Generations of Noah
- Tower of Babel
- Abram's migration
- A wife confused for a sister (featuring Abraham, Sarah, and Pharaoh, as characters)
- Abraham and Lot's conflict
- Chedorlaomer
- Abraham and Melchizedek
- Covenant of the pieces
- Hagar
- The first circumcision
- Sodom and Gomorrah
- Lot's drunkenness
- Cave of the Patriarchs
- A wife confused for a sister (featuring Abraham, Sarah, and Abimelech, as characters)
- Keturah's sons
- Isaac and Rebecca
- Binding of Isaac
- A wife confused for a sister (featuring Isaac, Rebekah, and Abimelech, as characters)
- Jacob and Esau
- The blessing of Isaac
- Jacob's Ladder
- Jacob and Rachel/The sheep and the stone
- Rachel and Leah
- Jacob's children
- Jacob's gifts to Esau
- Jacob's reconciliation with Esau
- Jacob wrestling with the angel
- Rape of Dinah
- Joseph enslaved
- Tamar and Judah
- Potiphar's wife
- Blessing of Jacob

=== Exodus ===
- The Finding of Moses
- The Burning Bush
- Zipporah at the inn
- Let my people go
- Bricks without straw
- With a strong hand and an outstretched arm
- Aaron's rod becomes a serpent
- The Plagues of Egypt
- The Passover
- The Exodus
- Passage of the Red Sea
- The Song of the sea
- Massah U-Meribah
- Amalek
- Jethro
- The Ten Commandments (first set)
- The Covenant Code
- The Golden Calf
- The Ten Commandments (second set)
- Construction of the Tabernacle (Exodus 35-40)

=== Leviticus ===
- The Priestly Code
- The Holiness Code
- The Ordination of Aaron and His Sons
- The Death of Nadab and Abihu (Leviticus 10:1-20)
- A Blasphemer Stoned (Leviticus 24:10-23)

=== Numbers ===
- Snow-white Miriam
- The report of the spies
- Aaron's rod sprouts and bears fruit
- Waters of Meribah
- Lifting up of the brass serpent (Nehushtan)
- Balaam and the Donkey
- The Heresy of Peor
- The War against the Midianites.
- Machir, Reuben, and Gad, in Gilead and Jazeer

=== Deuteronomy ===
- Moses Begins to Retell Wilderness Stories, Deuteronomy 1-3
- The Deuteronomic Code
- The Song of Moses, Deuteronomy 32
- The Blessing of Moses, Deuteronomy 33
- The Death of Moses, Deuteronomy 34

== Nevi'im ==
=== Joshua ===
- Charge from God to Joshua. Joshua takes charge, Joshua 1:1-18
- Rahab and the Spies
- The Fall of Jericho
- The Sun Stands Still

=== Judges ===
- Judges 1: Israelite tribes attempt to conquer Canaanite cities
- Israel Disobeys God, 2:1-23

Othniel

- Othniel's Campaign as Judge, 3:7-11

Ehud

- Ehud gains the victory over Moabite King Eglon 3:12-30

Shamgar

Judges 3:31

Deborah

- Deborah, 4:1-24
- The Song of Deborah, 5:1-31

Gideon

- The Lord Appears to Gideon, 6:1-40
- The Sign of the Fleece and Gideon's Three Hundred, 7:1-25
- Midian Subdued, 8:1-35

Abimelech

- Abmilech, son of Gideon (Jerubbaal) made king at Shechem after destroying his own family, 9:1-6
- Jotham, the lone survivor and brother, tells The Parable of the Trees. He speaks against Abimelech then flees, 9:7-21
- Shechem betrays Abimelech. He attacks and destroys the city.
- Abimelech captures the town of Thebez, but he is mortally wounded by a woman. 9:22-57

Tola

- Tola the son of Puah, the son of Dodo, a man of Issachar dwelt in Shamir in mount Ephraim. He judged Israel for twenty-three years, 10:1,2

Jair

Jephthah

- Jephthah and His Vow, 11: 1-40

Ibzah

12:8-10

Elon

12:11, 12

Abdon

12:13-15

Samson

- The Birth of Samson, 13:1-25
- Samson's Phlistine Wife, 14:1-20
- The Philistine's Defeated, 15: 1-20
- Samson and Delilah, 16:1-31
- The Death of Samson, 17:1-13

Other Stories

- Micah's Idolatry, 18:1–31
- Levite's concubine, gang rape at Gibeah, 19:1–30
- Benjamite War: Battle of Gibeah, 20:1–48
- Abduction of the women of Jabesh Gilead and Shiloh, 21:1–25

=== 1 & 2 Samuel ===
- Hannah and the Birth of Samuel
- David and Goliath
- David and Jonathan
- David and Bathsheba
- Absalom's Conspiracy

=== 1 & 2 Kings ===
- The Wisdom of Solomon
- Solomon builds the Temple
- The Queen of Sheba
- Elijah on Mount Carmel
- Elijah Taken up to Heaven
- The Healing of Naaman
- Hezekiah

=== Jeremiah ===
- Call of Jeremiah, 1:1-10
- Jeremiah sees an almond rod then a boiling pot, 1:11-19
- Jeremiah's message at the temple gate, 7:1-34
- Jeremiah buys a linen waistband and puts it in the crevice of a rock near the Euphrates. 13:1-11
- The LORD tells Jeremiah that he can't get married or have children, 16:1-21
- Jeremiah stands at the city gate proclaiming the Sabbath's importance 17:19-27
- Jeremiah visits the potter, 18:1-23
- Jeremiah takes a potter's clay jar and some of the elders to the valley of Ben-hinnon, 19:1-15
- Pashur, the chief officer in the house of the LORD, beats Jeremiah and puts him in stocks. Jeremiah's complains to God. 20:1-18
- Zedekiah, Pashur, and Zephaniah ask Jeremiah if there is a positive message from the LORD. Jeremiah prophesies doom for them. He predicts the coming of the Branch. 21:1-23:40
- Jeremiah summarizes 23 years of prophetic ministry; lists the nations under judgment and predicts 70 years of captivity. 25:1-38
- Jeremiah prophesies against the temple and the city. He is accused of a capital crime. His life is spared after discussion of precedence. Thanks to Ahikam the son of Shaphan. 26:1-24
- Following the LORD's directive, Jeremiah puts himself in bonds and a yoke. He relates that the LORD has given Nebuchadnezzar the land until his time comes. Hananiah breaks Jeremiah's yoke and prophesies the opposite message. 27:1-22
- The Exile

=== Hosea ===
Hosea was a prophet who lived and prophesied just before the destruction of Israel in 722 BC. He preached to the northern kingdom. Throughout the book you will see that he refers to Israel and Ephraim. Ephraim was the largest tribe in Israel and sometimes the whole nation was referred to as Ephraim.

=== Jonah ===
- Jonah and the Fish

== Ketuvim ==
=== Ruth ===
- Boaz and Ruth

=== Esther ===
- Esther and Mordechai

=== Daniel ===
- Nebuchadnezzar's Dream
- Daniel in the lions' den
- The Fiery Furnace
- The writing on the wall

=== Ezra/Nehemiah ===
- The Return to Jerusalem
- The Building of the Second Temple

== See also ==
- Hebrew Bible
- List of New Testament stories
