= Lists of Bible pericopes =

Lists of Bible pericopes itemize Bible stories or pericopes of the Bible. They include stories from the Hebrew Bible and from the Christian New Testament.

- List of Hebrew Bible events
- List of New Testament pericopes

- Gospel harmony#A parallel harmony presentation
- Acts of the Apostles#Outline
- Events of Revelation
