= List of New Testament pericopes =

See Lists of Bible stories.

New Testament stories are the pericopes or stories from the New Testament of Christianity.

== The Gospels and the Life of Jesus ==
For a list of all events in the life of Jesus, see Gospel harmony
For a list of parables told by Jesus, see Parables of Jesus
For a list of miracles attributed to Jesus, see Miracles of Jesus

== The Acts of the Apostles ==
From the Acts of the Apostles

- Ascension of Christ (1:1–9)
- Matthias replaced Judas (1:12–26)
- The Day of Pentecost (2)
- Ananias and Sapphira (5:1–11)
- Seven Greeks appointed (6:1–7)
- The Stoning of Stephen (6:8–7:60)
- Preaching of Philip the Evangelist (8:4–40)
- Simon the Sorcerer (8:9–24)
- Paul's Conversion on the Road to Damascus (9)
- Peter's vision of a sheet with animals (10:9–16)
- Conversion of Cornelius (10:1–48)
- James, son of Zebedee executed (12:1–2)
- Liberation of Saint Peter (12:3–19)
- Death of Herod Agrippa I [44 AD] (12:20–25)
- Paul and Barnabas' first missionary journey (13–14)
- The Council of Jerusalem (15:1–35)
- Paul's Second missionary journey (15:36–18:22)
- Paul's Third missionary journey (18:23–21:16)
- Paul before Felix (24)
- Paul before Festus (25:1–12)
- Paul before Agrippa II (25:23–26:32)
- Paul's Journey to Rome (27–28)

== Epistle to the Galatians ==
From the Epistle to the Galatians

- Conversion of Paul the Apostle (1:11–24)
- a meeting, possibly the Council of Jerusalem (2:1–10)
- Incident at Antioch (2:11–14)

== Revelation ==
For a list of events in the Book of Revelation, see Events of Revelation

== See also ==
- Chronology of Jesus
- List of Hebrew Bible events
- New Testament
