= With a strong hand and an outstretched arm =

Phrase in the Bible describing God's use of his power on behalf of Israel

"With a strong hand and an outstretched arm" (Hebrew: בְּיָד חֲזָקָה וּבִזְרוֹעַ נְטוּיָה, romanized: bə-yāḏ ḥăzāqāh ū-ḇizrōwa‘ nəṭūyāh) is a phrase used in the Bible to describe God's use of his power on behalf of Israel, particularly during the Exodus.

== Origin ==
The phrase is used many times in the Bible to describe God's powerful deeds during the Exodus: Exodus 6:6, Deuteronomy 4:34 5:15 7:19 9:29 11:2 26:8, Psalms 136:12.

The phrase is also used to describe other past or future mighty deeds of God, in the following sources: II Kings 17:36, Jeremiah 21:5 27:5 32:17, Ezekiel 20:33 20:34, II Chronicles 6:32.

A shortened version ("with a strong hand") is also used to refer to the Exodus: in Exodus 3:19 6:1 13:9 13:16 32:11 among other places.

== In Exodus ==
In Exodus 6 (Parshat Va'eira in the Torah), Moses has just reiterated to God the complaint of the Israelites that things have gotten worse for them every time he has gone to the pharaoh on their behalf; in this case, the paraoh has ruled that they shall henceforward make bricks without straw. God replies to Moses that the time will come when the pharaoh himself will drive the Israelites out of Egypt, and that, on behalf of his covenant with the Patriarchs, God will redeem the Israelites with a strong hand and an outstretched arm, so that they will know him.

Moses and Aaron did not reply directly to the Israelites regarding their complaint, but when Moses conveys this reply from God to the Israelites, it fails to lift their spirits.

The implication is that God will provide a lesson to both the Israelites and the nations of the world, showing his power and the futility of trying to resist it, as well as his willingness to use his power on behalf of his Covenant. To achieve this, the pharaoh must have been seen not to be freeing the Israelites as an act of benevolence, but instead to be adamantly resistant at first, then changing his mind to the point where he drives them to leave, due only to his eventual reluctant submission to God's might.

This concept is repeated in the recount of the Plague of Hail. This serves as the introduction to the demonstrations of God's power, beginning with Aaron's Rod and followed by the Ten Plagues of Egypt.

The phrase has come to have great value in Judaic tradition as the symbol of God's use of his power on behalf of the Jews. It is repeated verbatim in Deuteronomy 26:8, which describes the commandment to tithe first fruits and which is read with emphasis in the Passover Haggadah and Seder.

== Egyptian parallels ==
In ancient Egyptian royal literature, a pharaoh is frequently described as using his "mighty hand" or "outstretched arm" to perform mighty deeds. By describing God's defeat of Egypt in this language, the Bible argues that its God has outdone the greatest earthly leader.
