= The Shallows (book) =

2010 nonfiction book by Nicholas Carr

The Shallows: What the Internet Is Doing to Our Brains
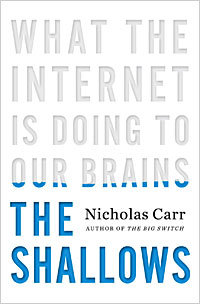
- Author: Nicholas G. Carr
- Language: English
- Publisher: W. W. Norton & Company
- Publication date: 2010
- Media type: Print (Hardback)
- Pages: 280
- ISBN: 978-0-393-33975-8

The Shallows: What the Internet Is Doing to Our Brains, published in the United Kingdom as The Shallows: How the Internet Is Changing the Way We Think, Read and Remember, is a 2010 book by the American journalist Nicholas G. Carr. Published by W. W. Norton & Company, the book expands on the themes first raised in "Is Google Making Us Stupid?", Carr's 2008 essay in The Atlantic, and explores the effects of the Internet on the brain. The book claims research shows "online reading" yields lower comprehension than reading a printed page. The Shallows was a finalist for the 2011 Pulitzer Prize in General Nonfiction.

== Impact ==
The band I Like Trains released a 2012 concept album, The Shallows, influenced by the book.

== See also ==
- Four Arguments for the Elimination of Television – 1978 book by Jerry Mander
- The Gutenberg Galaxy – 1962 book by Marshall McLuhan
- Shallow reading – Superficial information acquisition method

== Additional reading ==
- Brown, Tiffany Lee (2011). Depth Matters. Original print publication: Plazm (magazine), Issue #30, 2011.
- Carr, N. (2010). The Juggler's Brain. The Phi Delta Kappan, 92(4): 8–14. (subscription required)
- Horgan, J. (June 4, 2010). So Many Links, So Little Time . Wall Street Journal. 255(129): A17.
- Temple, J. (June 12, 2011). 'Shallows': Nicholas Carr on information overload. San Francisco Chronicle. E1.
