= Nicholas G. Carr =

American journalist and writer

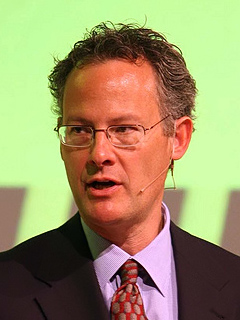
- Nicholas Carr speaking at the VINT Symposium held in Utrecht, Netherlands on June 17, 2008
- Born: 1959 (age 66–67)
- Education: Dartmouth College, Harvard University
- Occupation: Writer
- Writing career
- Notable work: The Shallows: What the Internet Is Doing to Our Brains

Nicholas G. Carr (born 1959) is an American journalist and writer who has published books and articles on technology, business, and culture. His book The Shallows: What the Internet Is Doing to Our Brains was a finalist for the 2011 Pulitzer Prize in General Nonfiction.

== Career ==
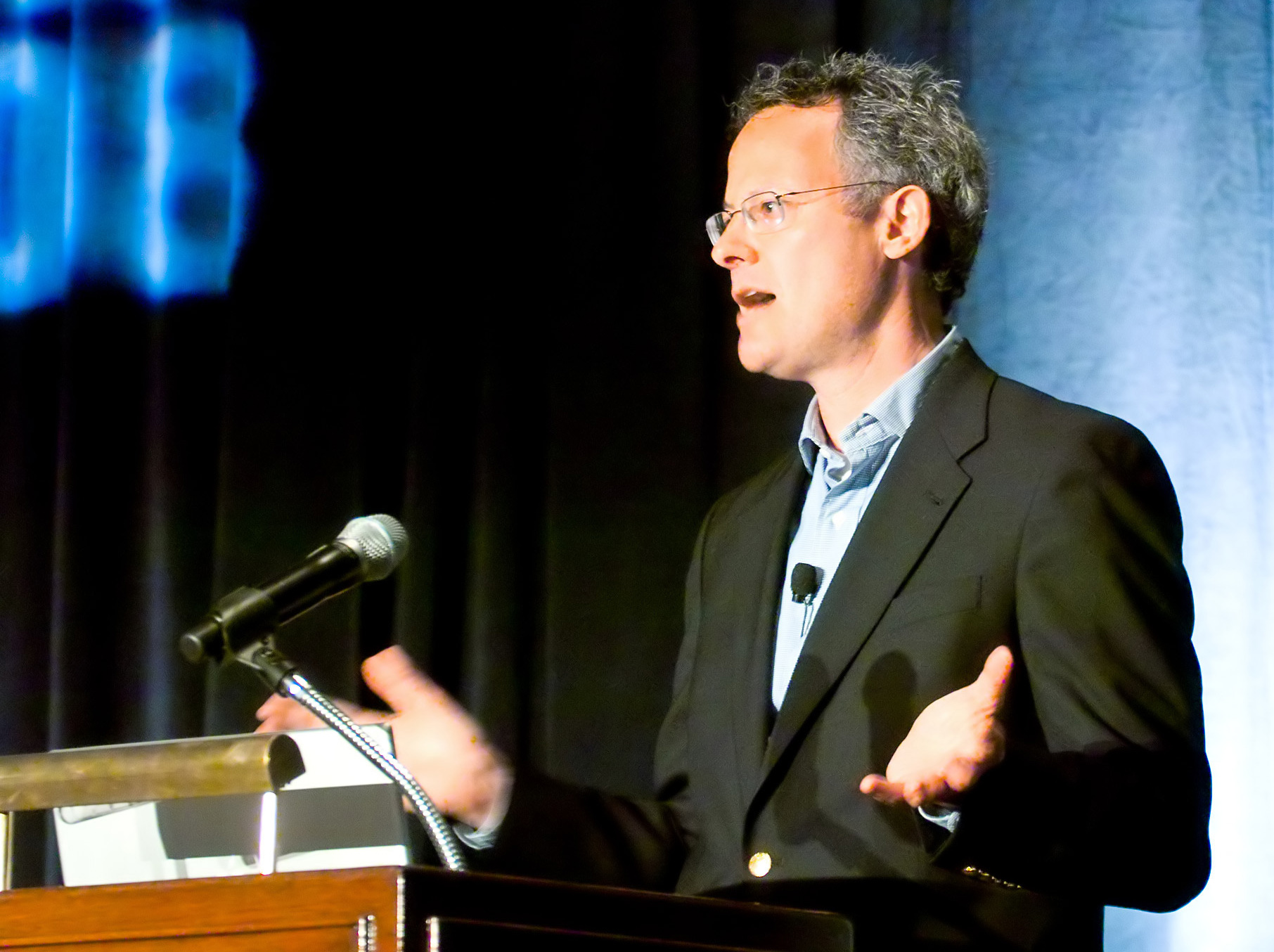
Nicholas Carr speaking at the 12th Annual Gilder/Forbes Telecosm Conference at The Sagamore Resort in Lake George, New York on May 28, 2008.

Nicholas Carr originally came to prominence with the 2003 Harvard Business Review article "IT Doesn't Matter" and the 2004 book Does IT Matter? Information Technology and the Corrosion of Competitive Advantage (Harvard Business School Press). In these widely discussed works, he argued that the strategic importance of information technology in business has diminished as IT has become more commonplace, standardized and cheaper. His ideas roiled the information technology industry, spurring heated outcries from executives of Microsoft, Intel, Hewlett-Packard and other leading technology companies, although the ideas got mixed responses from other commentators.

In 2005, Carr published the controversial article "The End of Corporate Computing" in the MIT Sloan Management Review, in which he argued that in the future companies will purchase information technology as a utility service from outside suppliers. Carr's second book, The Big Switch: Rewiring the World, From Edison to Google, was published in January 2008 by W. W. Norton. It examines the economic and social consequences of the rise of Internet-based cloud computing, comparing the consequences to those that occurred with the rise of electric utilities in the early 20th century.

In the summer of 2008, The Atlantic published Carr's article "Is Google Making Us Stupid?" as the cover story of its annual Ideas issue. Highly critical of the Internet's effect on cognition, the article has been read and debated widely in both the media and the blogosphere. Carr's main argument is that the Internet may have detrimental effects on cognition that diminish the capacity for concentration and contemplation.

Carr's 2010 book, The Shallows, develops this argument further. Discussing various examples ranging from Nietzsche's typewriter to London cab drivers' GPS navigators, Carr shows how newly introduced technologies change the way people think, act and live. The book focuses on the detrimental influence of the Internet—although it does recognize its beneficial aspects—by investigating how hypertext has contributed to the fragmentation of knowledge. When users search the Web, for instance, the context of information can be easily ignored. "We don't see the trees," Carr writes. "We see twigs and leaves." One of Carr's major points is that the change caused by the Internet involves the physical restructuring of the human brain, which he explains using the notion of "neuroplasticity." In addition to being a Pulitzer Prize nominee, the book appeared on the New York Times nonfiction bestseller list and has been translated into 17 languages.

In 2014, Carr published his fourth book, The Glass Cage: Automation and Us, which presents a critical examination of the role of computer automation in contemporary life. Spanning historical, technical, economic, and philosophical viewpoints, the book has been widely acclaimed by reviewers, with the New York Times Sunday Book Review terming it "essential."

In 2016, Carr published Utopia Is Creepy: and Other Provocations, a collection of blog posts, essays, and reviews from 2005 to 2016. The book provides a critique of modern American techno-utopianism, which TIME magazine said "punches a hole in Silicon Valley cultural hubris." In 2025, Carr published Superbloom: How Technologies of Connection Tear Us Apart, which presents a critique of social media's impact on contemporary society.

Carr has been executive editor of the Harvard Business Review. He has also served as a member of the editorial board of advisors of Encyclopædia Britannica. In 2019, Carr was the Richmond Visiting Professor of Sociology at Williams College.

== Wikipedia critique ==
Through his blogs "Rough Type" and "New Cartographies", Carr has been a critic of technological utopianism and in particular the populist claims made for online social production.

In May 2007, Carr argued that the dominance of Wikipedia pages in many search results represents a dangerous consolidation of Internet traffic and authority, which may be leading to the creation of what he called "information plantations". Carr coined the term "wikicrats" (a pejorative description of Wikipedia administrators) in August 2007, as part of a more general critique of what he sees as Wikipedia's tendency to develop ever more elaborate and complex systems of rules and bureaucratic ranks or castes over time.

== Education ==
Carr holds a B.A. from Dartmouth College and an M.A. in English and American literature and language from Harvard University.

== Publications ==
- Digital Enterprise: How to Reshape Your Business for a Connected World (2001) ISBN 1-57851-558-0
- Does IT Matter? (2004) ISBN 1-59139-444-9
- The Big Switch: Rewiring the World, from Edison to Google (2008, W. W. Norton) ISBN 978-0-393-06228-1
- The Shallows: What the Internet Is Doing to Our Brains (2010, W. W. Norton) ISBN 978-0-393-07222-8
- The Glass Cage: Automation and Us (2014, W. W. Norton) ISBN 978-0-393-24076-4
- Utopia Is Creepy: and Other Provocations (2016, W. W. Norton) ISBN 978-0-393-25454-9
- Superbloom: How Technologies of Connection Tear Us Apart (2025, W.W. Norton) ISBN 978-1324064619

=== Articles ===
- "IT Doesn't Matter". Harvard Business Review. 81 (5): 41–9, 128. May 2003. PMID 12747161.
- "IT Doesn't Matter, With Letters to the Editor" (PDF). Harvard Business Review. May–June 2003.
- "'Is Google Making Us Stupid?': sources and notes". Rough Type. August 7, 2008.

== See also ==
- Carr–Benkler wager
