= Shallow reading =

Superficial information acquisition method

Shallow reading refers to social practices in which people acquire information or entertainment quickly from texts, images or other meaningful forms, individual or combination, by using various modern media. Shallow reading as a representational form of post-modern mass culture reflects a transition of expense principle tendency from print culture towards visual culture.

== Background ==
With the continuous update of advanced media technology and popularization of Internet, people are stepping into mobile Internet era. In this process, an obvious change is that traditional reading mode is gradually shifting to shallow reading. The prevalence of shallow reading has attracted attention of media, publishing and library fields.

== Features ==
1. Superficial:In order to enable people obtain useful information during the process of quick browsing, the target materials of shallow reading are usually very clear and easy to understand as well as with clear-cut topics.
2. Visual: Objectives of shallow reading are often short texts with illustrations and pictures, or even images and/or video without text captions.
3. Recreational:For deep readers, traditional reading is a process of thinking training and a cultivation of aesthetic culture while shallow reading gets rid of the seriousness of deep reading and mainly aim at facilitating readers acquire information and entertainment in a relaxing and interactive atmosphere.

== See also ==
- Reading comprehension – Ability to read and understand text
- Screen reading – Reading a text on a computer or smart device screen
- Speed reading – Techniques claiming to improve the ability to read quickly
- The Shallows (book) – 2010 nonfiction book by Nicholas Carr
