= Bricks without straw =

Idiom

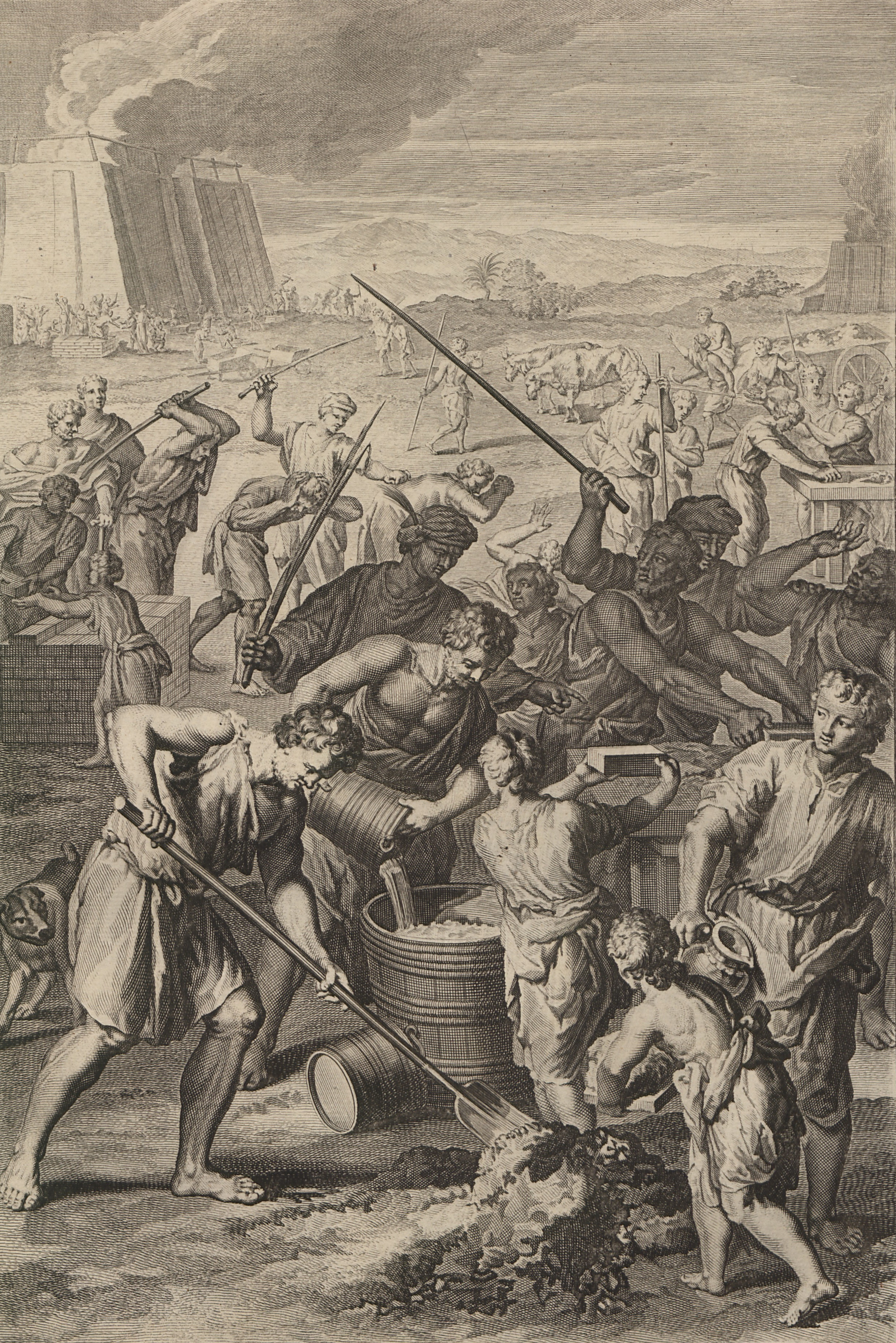
A depiction of the Hebrews' bondage in Egypt, during which they were forced to make bricks without straw.

Bricks without straw is a phrase that refers to a task which must be undertaken without appropriate resources.

== Biblical narrative ==
In Exodus 5 (Parshat Shemot in the Torah), Moses and Aaron meet with the pharaoh and deliver God's message, "Let my people go". The pharaoh not only refuses, but punishes the Israelites by telling his overseers, "Ye shall no more give the people straw to make brick, as heretofore: let them go and gather straw for themselves", but still requiring the same daily output of bricks as before. The Israelites complain to Moses and Aaron that they have now made things worse for them, and Moses in turn complains to God that every time he has gone to the pharaoh on behalf of the Israelites, things have gotten worse for them. God replies to Moses that the time will come when the pharaoh himself will actually drive the Israelites out of Egypt; and that on behalf of his covenant with the Patriarchs, God will redeem the Israelites "with a strong hand and an outstretched arm", so that they will know him.

The scripture gives no account of Moses or Aaron replying directly to the Israelites regarding their complaint, but only of Moses' discussing it with God, and God's reply, which Moses conveys to the Israelites.

== Making bricks with straw ==
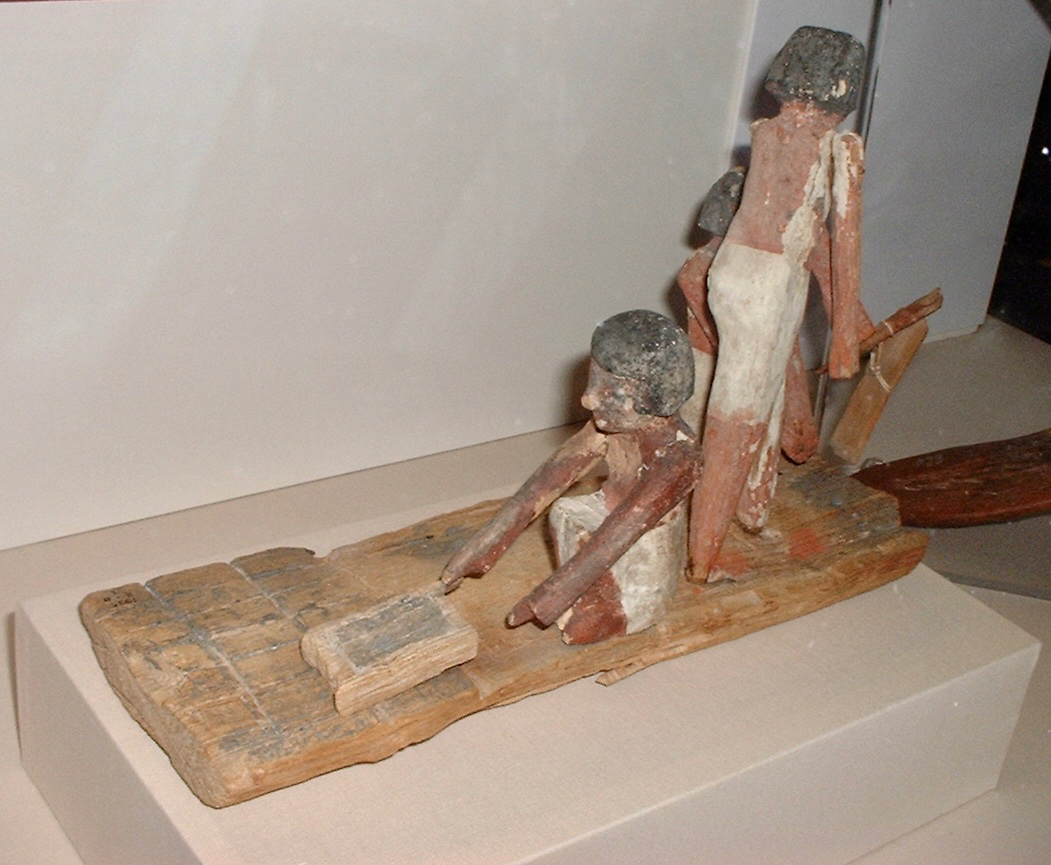
Ancient Egyptian painted wooden model of three men making bricks, 12th Dynasty, 1991–1778 BCE, Beni Hasan tomb 275, British Museum

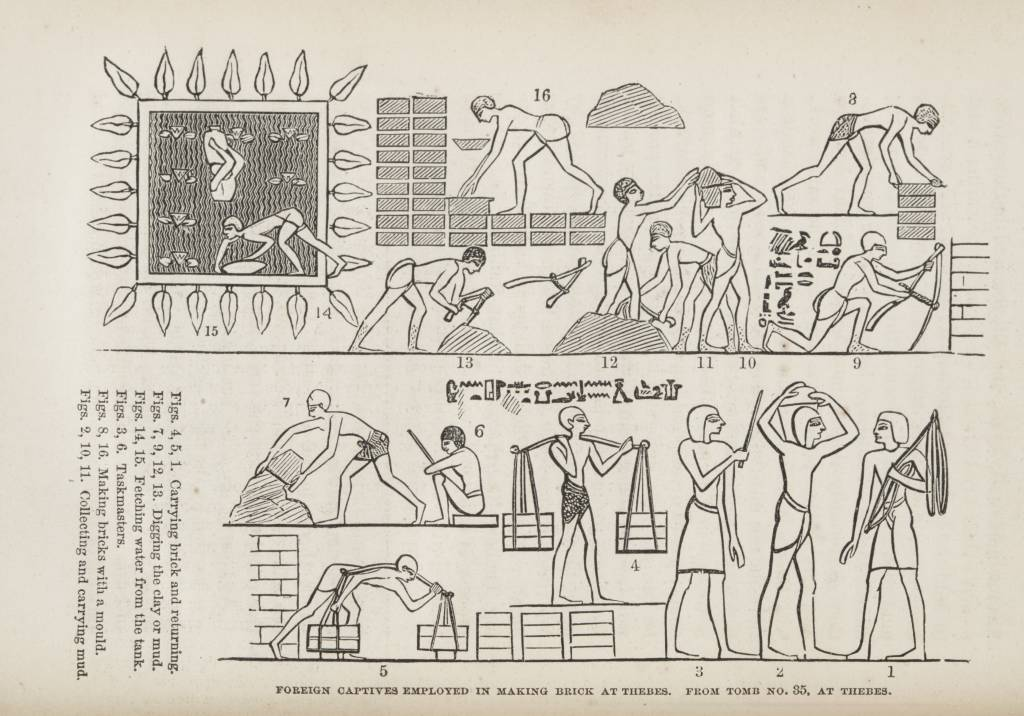
Diagram of ancient Egyptian brick production, based on mural in the Tomb of Rechmirê, Thebes, Egypt, 1500-1450 BCE

Many clay products require the addition of other materials to add strength and durability. In the case of bricks in Old Testament Egypt – river clay is usually composed of very fine particles and so would dry slowly – adding straw would "open up" the clay, allowing it to dry more readily in the sun. In addition to aiding in drying, the linear nature of straw adds stability to the clay brick in much the same way that rebar or wire mesh reinforce modern-day concrete. Bricks made without straw would break and crumble easily. Adobe bricks used around the world are generally only sun dried but grasses, straw and other materials are added to the clay for the same basic reasons.

The ancient brick-making process can still be seen on Egyptian tomb paintings and models.

== In popular culture ==
The phrase 'bricks without straw' appears in the Academy Award winning film The Ten Commandments (1956 film), when Ramses II (played by Yul Brynner) decrees that Moses "bear [his staff] before [his] idle people, and bid them [the Israelites] make brick without straw".
