= Arrowsmith School =

Private school in Toronto, Canada

Location
- 245 St. Clair Avenue West; Toronto, Toronto, Ontario, M4V 1R3; Canada; 43.6856°N 79.4056°W

Information
- School type: Private, Co-educational day school for children with specific learning disabilities
- Motto: Strengthen Your Brain. Be At Your Best.
- Founded: 1980
- Principal: Shelley Woon
- Grades: 1 – 12
- Language: English
- Website: school.arrowsmith.ca

The Arrowsmith School is a private school in Toronto, Ontario, for children in Grades 1 to 12 with learning disabilities (also referred to as "specific learning difficulties"). The Arrowsmith School was founded in Toronto in 1980 by Barbara Arrowsmith Young.

The school's methodology, known as the Arrowsmith Program, was founded by Arrowsmith Young in 1978 from exercises that she had begun devising for herself in 1977 and which she has stated enabled her to overcome her own severe learning difficulties. Her struggle with a learning disability and the rationale for her program are described in her 2012 book The Woman Who Changed Her Brain. According to Arrowsmith Young, her methodology is based on research into the principle of neuroplasticity, which suggests that the brain is dynamic and constantly rewiring itself. The program has been incorporated into other public and private schools and learning centres in multiple countries.

== History ==
Barbara Arrowsmith Young and her then-husband, Joshua Cohen, founded the original Toronto school in 1980 to teach learning disabled children using the program and exercises that Arrowsmith Young had begun devising for herself in 1978 and which she proclaims enabled her to overcome her own severe learning difficulties.

The original school was housed in a rented building on Yorkville Ave. According to Arrowsmith Young's autobiographical account in her 2012 book, The Woman Who Changed Her Brain, she used her middle name for the school in honor of her paternal grandmother (born Louie May Arrowsmith in 1883), who as a young girl had been one of the pioneer settlers of Creston, British Columbia. The Toronto school gradually expanded, and in 1991 she and Cohen decided to open a second school in Brooklyn, New York and wind down the Toronto school. However, by 1994 the New York school had folded, and the marriage of Arrowsmith Young and Cohen had ended. She returned to Toronto and re-opened the school there, this time in a rented building on Yonge St.

The school eventually moved to its present location, a converted house on St. Clair Avenue W in the Forest Hill neighborhood of Toronto. Barbara Arrowsmith Young remains its director and owner as she does of a second, smaller branch in Peterborough, Ontario which opened in 2005.

Both branches saw increasing numbers of students from outside Canada following Arrowsmith Young's 2012 speaking tour to New Zealand, Australia, and the United Kingdom to promote her book The Woman Who Changed Her Brain. In October 2012, international students made up about a third of the student population of the Peterborough branch (seven from Australia, one student from the United Arab Emirates, and one from the United States).

In 2005 Howard Eaton opened the Eaton Arrowsmith School in Vancouver which is modelled on the Arrowsmith School in Toronto. The Eaton Arrowsmith School subsequently established further branches in British Columbia at Victoria in 2009 and White Rock in 2012. Eaton then established a branch in the United States at Redmond, Washington, the Eaton Arrowsmith Academy, which opened in September 2014. Eaton is the owner and Director of all four Eaton Arrowsmith schools.

== Curriculum and tuition fees ==
Full-time day students, who form the core of the Toronto school's student body, follow a curriculum which devotes two periods of the school day to mathematics and English, the only two academic subjects taught at the school. The remainder of their time (six periods per day) is taken up with carrying out the cognitive remediation exercises known as the Arrowsmith Program.

It also runs part-time programs for both children and adults. The school's annual tuition fees for full-time day students are $30,000.

== Arrowsmith Program ==
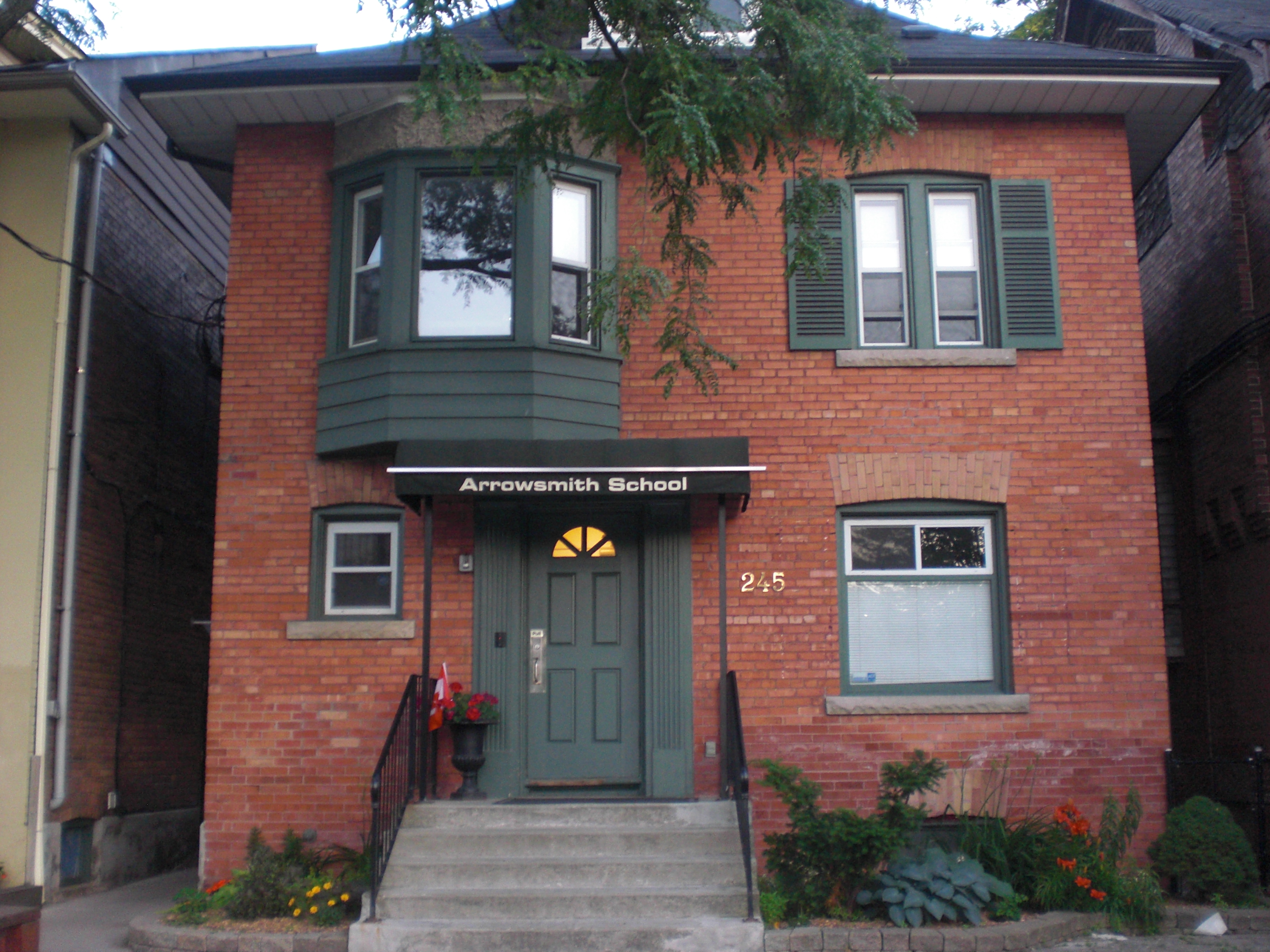
The main section of the Arrowsmith School in Toronto.

The Arrowsmith Program (a registered trademark) refers to the Arrowsmith School's methodology which is also available under license to students in some public and private schools in Canada, the United States, Australia and New Zealand. Collectively more than 65 schools in these four countries use the program. According to the Arrowsmith School's official website, the program can be used by children and adults with learning disabilities such as dyslexia, dyscalculia and dysgraphia who have at least average intelligence, but it is not suitable for people who have an autism spectrum disorder or an acquired brain injury.

=== History and methodology ===
The program was founded by Barbara Arrowsmith Young while she was a graduate student at the Ontario Institute for Studies in Education. As a child she had exceptional visual and auditory memory, but it was coupled with several severe deficits in other areas, including dyslexia, dyscalculia, and problems with spatial reasoning, logic, and kinesthetic perception. In 1977–1978 she developed a series of remedial exercises which she says helped her to overcome her own disabilities rather than merely compensate for them. According to Arrowsmith Young, she based the program on Mark Rosenzweig's work on neuroplasticity and on the work of Alexander Luria and his theories about the relationship between the neurodynamic processes in different functional systems of the brain.

In their 2015 audit of 15 remedial programs for specific learning difficulties for the New Zealand organization SPELD, (Note: SPELD is a private non-profit organisation supporting children with specific learning disabilities in New Zealand. Dawson and D'Souza's audit was supervised by David Moreau (Research Fellow) and Karen Waldie (Associate Professor) at the Centre for Brain Research and School of Psychology, University of Auckland.) George Dawson and Stephanie D'Souza gave basic descriptions of the nineteen areas of cognitive processing which the Arrowsmith Program is intended to improve as well as descriptions of some of its remediation exercises. In their introduction Dawson and D'Souza stated that the Arrowsmith Program is licensed on a for-profit payment basis with detailed descriptions of its exercises not publicly available and that their descriptions were based on Arrowsmith Young's own account in The Woman Who Changed Her Brain.

The deficit areas for which Dawson and D'Souza were able to provide basic descriptions of the Arrowsmith remedial exercises included:

- Motor symbol sequencing The remedial exercise involves tracing using pen and paper while the student's left eye is covered. According to Arrowsmith Young's description of the program, this is intended to stimulate the left hemisphere motor cortex and thus improve tracking while reading and improve the ability to use "binocular vision cues".
- Symbol relations The remedial exercise involves reading analog clocks with multiple hands displayed on a computer. The exercise has fourteen different rules. According to Arrowsmith Young, this exercise targets problems at the juncture of the occipital, parietal, and temporal lobes areas on the left side of the brain which can produce a tendency to reverse the sequence of letters in a word and make it difficult to parse syntax and read an analog clock.
- Memory for information or instructions The remedial exercise involves memorizing increasingly more complicated song lyrics by listening to them as many times as it takes to be able to repeat them accurately. According to Arrowsmith Young, this exercise targets the left hemisphere temporal lobe where a deficit manifests itself in an inability to remember accurately conversations, lectures, and instructions.
- Symbol recognition The remedial exercise involves remembering increasingly long strings of computer-presented letters from languages with a different orthography from English, such as Lashkari and Arabic etc.. According to Arrowsmith Young, this exercise targets deficits located in the occiptital-temporal area which cause difficulty in learning to read and spell.
- Artifactual thinking (R-Think) The remedial exercise involves looking a narrative picture and then forming a reasonable hypothesis of what story is being depicted. According to Arrowsmith Young, this exercise targets a deficit located in the right prefrontal cortex which cause difficulty in interpreting the emotions of others.

In their report, Dawson and D'Souza describe the remediation exercises for nine out of the nineteen areas as "vague", "not clear" or unspecified in Arrowsmith Young's book. These include:

- Broca's speech pronunciation According to Arrowsmith Young, this deficit located Broca's area of the brain, causes mispronunciation, restricted vocabulary, and difficulty in simultaneously speaking and thinking.
- Auditory speech discrimination According to Arrowsmith Young, this deficit involving the superior temporal lobe, reduces the capacity to distinguish words that rhyme, e.g., fear and hear.
- Symbolic thinking According to Arrowsmith Young, this deficit involving the prefrontal cortex causes a short attention span and reduces capacity for "mental initiative".
- Kinaesthetic perception According to Arrowsmith Young, this deficit involves the somatosensory area of the parietal lobe which causes clumsiness (a tendency to bump into things) and may adversely affect handwriting.

At the conclusion of the audit Dawson and D'Souza noted that the "evidence" for the program's efficacy is documented via testimonials from some of the students and their parents and in several research reports, although none have been published in peer-reviewed academic journals. In the authors' conclusion:

The Arrowsmith programme claims to be founded on neuroscience research. This is true in the sense that Arrowsmith Young continually refers back to localisation of (dys)function as described by Luria when describing the development of her cognitive exercises. However, it is not the case that (present) neuroscience research actually supports the use of Arrowsmith's particular exercises to remediate learning disabilities.

== Controversies ==
Norman Doidge, a Canadian psychiatrist and psychoanalyst devoted one of the chapters in his 2008 book The Brain That Changes Itself to Barbara Arrowsmith Young and the Arrowsmith Program. In it, he recounts Arrowsmith Young's own struggle to overcome her learning disabilities and how she developed the program. The chapter also includes several brief case histories of children and adults who Doidge says were significantly helped by the program, although no quantifiable data is presented. He described her approach as "an important discovery" and one that had "major implications for education". (Note: The book The Brain That Changes Itself has also been criticized by scholars of psychoanalysis.)

However, as Doidge also acknowledged in the chapter, the Arrowsmith Program has been controversial. Widespread doubt and criticism has emerged from several psychologists, neuroscientists and learning experts. This has centered on the lack of scientific evidence used by the program to demonstrate its efficacy and on its underlying rationale which its critics say represents an oversimplification and misapplication of neuroscientific concepts.

Coinciding with Barbara Arrowsmith Young's speaking tour of Australia in 2012, the Catholic Education Office in Sydney announced that it would begin a pilot study involving 20 learning disabled students in their last two years of high school who would be offered the Arrowsmith Program for two years beginning in 2013. If it proved successful, the program would be extended to thousands of children in Catholic schools, including those in younger grades. The cost to parents whose children had been selected for the pilot study would be A$8000 for two years, over and above the normal school fees.

Several Australian academics were critical of the move. Dr Emma Burrows, a neuroscientist at the Florey Institute in Melbourne, and cognitive scientists Anne Castles and Max Coltheart at Macquarie University pointed out that the supposed "evidence" supporting the program's claims of success was anecdotal rather than based on studies using randomized control trials and published in peer-reviewed academic journals.

Both Castles and Coltheart have also criticised the Arrowsmith Program and other "brain training" programs such as the Dore Programme and Brain Gym as based on an oversimplification of neuroplasticity and other neuroscientific concepts.

According to a January 2015 announcement from the Archdiocese of Sydney, the two-year school trial in Sydney had "outstanding results". The Arrowsmith Program was incorporated into the Sydney Catholic School system in 2015 and expanded to include both primary and secondary school students. The data on which the evaluation was based were not provided in the announcement.

The trial itself was strongly criticized by neuroscientists as deceptive. They contend the Arrowsmith school's claims of being research-based are unfounded. Dr Burrows was further reported to have expressed concern after directly inquiring with Barbara Arrowsmith for evidence and learning that neuroscientists were not involved with the Arrowsmith Program.

In Canada, neuroscientist Adele Diamond and cognitive psychologist Linda Siegel—both based at the University of British Columbia in Vancouver—have expressed concerns similar to those of Castles and Coltheart. Both appeared in the 2008 CBC documentary about the Arrowsmith program. Fixing My Brain which was filmed at the Arrowsmith School in Toronto. A portion of Siegel's highly critical commentary was removed by the documentary's producers prior to broadcast after Arrowsmith Young's lawyers threatened the CBC with a lawsuit for libel. (Note: According to the film's producer, two sentences from Siegel were removed: "I think the Arrowsmith Program is a fraud. I think they're taking money from people and not showing any improvement in any kind of any objective way." The remainder of her commentary was left intact.)

Siegel was also the author of a 2003 report to the Vancouver School Board (VSB) on the efficacy of The Arrowsmith program. At the time, VSB was running a three-year trial of the program, funded in part by the Vancouver Foundation. According to Howard Eaton, the owner and Director of the Eaton Arrowsmith schools, Siegel's report had been influential in the VSB's decision to discontinue the pilot program.

Siegel's study compared the outcomes after eight months for children with learning disabilities at two Vancouver elementary schools. In one school the children received the Arrowsmith Program. In the other, the children were enrolled in an Extended Learning Assistance Class (ELAC) which focused on reading and writing. Siegel found that the superior performance of the Arrowsmith children on the comprehension and spelling measures was statistically significant. However, she found no statistically significant differences on the other measures, although she stated that on those measures "ELAC performed at higher levels than Arrowsmith, often by a relatively large amount." (Note: Quoted in Eaton, Howard (2013). "Siegel's Study: Points For Comment".)

Howard Eaton has stated that there were multiple problems with the design, sampling, and statistical analysis in Siegel's study, something which Siegel has also conceded.

In 2013 Eaton co-authored a re-analysis of Siegel's data with professors William Lancee and Darren Irwin. (Note: William Lancee is head of psychiatry research at Toronto's Mount Sinai Hospital and has also authored evaluations of the Arrowsmith Program for the Toronto Catholic District School. Darren Irwin is a professor in the Department of Zoology at the University of British Columbia.) Their conclusion was that the higher performance of the ELAC students in Siegel's study was "not statistically significant."

== See also ==
- Conductive education
- Commercial brain training programs
