= Smart Move =

Smart Move or Smart Moves may refer to:

- Smart Move (FIRST), the 2009-10 FIRST Lego League challenge
- SmartMove, part of Corel Linux
- Smart Moves, a book by Carla Hannaford
- "Smart Move", a feature of Logitech’s Mouseware
- "Smart Move", an episode of the American sitcom Friends and Lovers
- SmartMove, a credit-check service offered by TransUnion
- Smart Moves, a 1986 novel by Stuart M. Kaminsky
- Smart Moves, a 1986 jazz album by Harvie S

== See also ==
- Smartmovie, a mobile multimedia application
