= Sean Thomas (writer) =

British writer (born 1963)

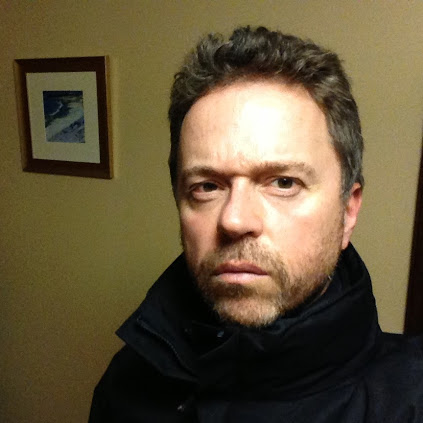
- Born: 1963 (age 62–63)
- Education: University College London
- Occupations: Journalist, author

Sean Thomas (born 1963) is a British journalist and author. Born in Devon, England, and educated at University College London, he has written for publications such as The Times, the Daily Mail, The Spectator and The Guardian, mainly on travel, politics and art. He has written about his troubled early life and multiple stepmothers. His father was the writer and translator D. M. Thomas, who died in 2023.

As a novelist, Thomas uses multiple pseudonyms. As Tom Knox, he specialises in archaeological and religious thrillers. He has also published erotic fiction under the pseudonym A. J. Molloy. More recently, he has written novels under the pen name S. K. Tremayne.

== Writing career ==
Thomas's first Tom Knox thriller, The Genesis Secret, focuses on the Neolithic archaeological site known as Göbekli Tepe in Turkey, which Thomas visited as a journalist in 2006. The book speculates on the genetic and sociological origins of Christianity, Judaism and Islam, with particular attention to the trait of sacrifice. Noteworthy for several exceptionally gruesome episodes, it was an international bestseller, and has so far been translated into 21 languages. The novel provoked controversy when the German Archaeology Institute complained that both a newspaper article and the book were based on "a falsified version of an interview with [chief archaeologist] Klaus Schmidt", which they argued constituted "a distortion of the scientific work of the German Archaeological Institute".

His second Tom Knox thriller, The Marks of Cain was published in 2010. Centring on the Cagot community who lived in the Basque Country, and the troubled history of the German empire in Namibia, it too was an international bestseller. In Germany, the ebook version, published under the title Cagot, was notable for its experimental use of interactivity and alternate reality games.

A third book, titled Bible of the Dead (or The Lost Goddess outside the United Kingdom) was published in March 2011 in the UK, and in the US in February 2012, and focuses on the Khmer Rouge, while taking in the cave paintings of France, and modern Chinese Communism. More recently, Thomas has returned to Cambodia and written on the inspiration for this novel, when he attended the 2009 UN trial of Khmer Rouge apparatchik, Comrade Duch.

In 2015, under the pseudonym S. K. Tremayne, Thomas published a novel called The Ice Twins, about a London couple who lose a child, one of identical twins, and thereafter move to a remote island in Scotland. The Ice Twins became a Sunday Times Top Ten Bestseller in February 2015.

The same novel, translated as IJstweeling, went into the Dutch top ten bestseller list, following its publication in the Netherlands in March 2015. In May 2015, under the title Eisige Schwestern, the same book entered the Spiegel bestseller list, in Germany; the book went on to spend fifteen weeks in the German top ten. In September 2015, The Ice Twins, in paperback form, became a number one Sunday Times bestseller in the UK. It has since been translated into at least 30 languages.

His second novel as S. K. Tremayne, The Fire Child, became a top ten bestseller in Germany in January 2017, under the title Stiefkind.

In January 2019 The Ice Twins became a Nielsen Silver Award winner, for selling 250,000 copies in the UK.

His novel Kissing England won the Literary Review's "Bad Sex" award in 2000, which is awarded for "the year's most outstandingly awful scene of sexual description in an otherwise good novel."

Thomas's fourth book, Millions Of Women Are Waiting To Meet You, was a memoir of his love life, it was a Guardian "book of the week" in 2007.

== Personal life ==
In 1987 Thomas was acquitted at a trial at the Old Bailey of a rape charge brought by his then-girlfriend. Thomas has written about his alcohol and drug addiction, especially heroin. In 2003 he wrote an article in The Spectator about his problems with internet porn, and how it caused him to "wank myself into hospital". The article is cited by psychiatrist Norman Doidge in his book The Brain That Changes Itself as a "remarkable account of a man's descent into porn addiction".

As of 2023, Thomas has two children and lives in Camden Town, North London.

== Bibliography ==
=== Sean Thomas ===
- Absent Fathers (1996) ISBN 978-0-233-99003-3
- Kissing England (2000) ISBN 978-0-00-226140-1
- The Cheek Perforation Dance (2002) ISBN 978-0-00-651445-9
- Millions of Women are Waiting to Meet You (2006) ISBN 978-0-7475-8556-5

=== As Tom Knox ===
- The Genesis Secret (2009) ISBN 978-0-670-02088-1
- The Marks of Cain (2010) ISBN 978-0-670-02191-8
- Bible of the Dead (2011, UK) / The Lost Goddess (2012, US) ISBN 978-0-670-02318-9
- The Babylon Rite (2012, UK; 2013, US) ISBN 978-0-00-734402-4
- The Deceit (2013) ISBN 978-0-007-45919-3

=== As A. J. Molloy ===
- The Story of X (2012) ISBN 0552169242

=== As S. K. Tremayne ===
- The Ice Twins (2015) ISBN 9780007563036
- The Fire Child (2016) ISBN 9780008105839
- Just Before I Died (2018) ISBN 9780008105884
- The Assistant (2019) ISBN 9780008309510
- The Drowning Hour (2022) ISBN 9789511441083
- The Wrecker's Girl (2026)
