= Psychological effects of Internet use =

Various researchers have undertaken efforts to examine the psychological effects of Internet use. Some research employs studying brain functions in Internet users. Some studies assert that these changes are harmful, while others argue that asserted changes are beneficial.

== Assertions ==
American writer Nicholas Carr asserts that Internet use reduces the deep thinking that leads to true creativity. He also says that hyperlinks and overstimulation means that the brain must give most of its attention to short-term decisions. Carr also states that the vast availability of information on the World Wide Web overwhelms the brain and hurts long-term memory. He says that the availability of stimuli leads to a very large cognitive load, which makes it difficult to remember anything.

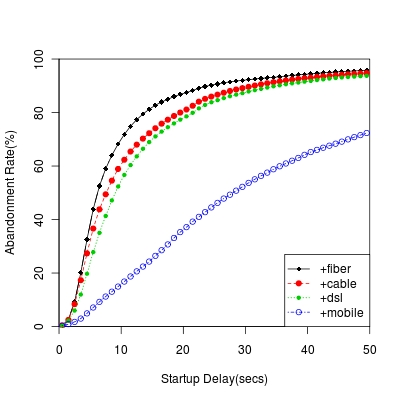
In a November 2012 study involving millions of users watching online videos, users with faster Internet connectivity (e.g., fiber) abandoned a slow-loading video at a faster rate than similar users with slower Internet connectivity (e.g., cable or mobile). Commentators have argued that the Sitaraman study shows that when humans get accustomed to a faster flow of information on the Internet, they become more impatient and have less tolerance for delays.

Computer scientist Ramesh Sitaraman has asserted that Internet users are impatient and are likely to get more impatient with time. In a large-scale research study that completed in 2012 involving millions of users watching videos on the Internet, Krishnan and Sitaraman show that users start to abandon online videos if they do not start playing within two seconds. In addition, users with faster Internet connections (such as FTTH) showed less patience and abandoned videos at a faster rate than users with slower Internet connections. Many commentators have since argued that these results provide a glimpse into the future: as Internet services become faster and provide more instant gratification, people become less patient and less able to delay gratification and work towards longer-term rewards.

Psychologist Steven Pinker, however, argues that people have control over what they do, and that research and reasoning never came naturally to people. He says that "experience does not revamp the basic information-processing capacities of the brain" and asserts that the Internet is actually making people smarter.

== MRI studies ==
The BBC describes the research published in the peer-reviewed science journal PLoS ONE:

"A research team led by Hao Lei of the Chinese Academy of Sciences in Wuhan carried out brain scans of 35 men and women aged between 14 and 21. Seventeen of them were classed as having Internet addiction disorder (IAD) on the basis of answering yes to questions such as, "Have you repeatedly made unsuccessful efforts to control, cut back or stop Internet use?"

Specialised MRI brain scans showed changes in the white matter of the brain—the part that contains nerve fibres—in those classed as being web addicts, compared with non-addicts. Furthermore, the study says, "We provided evidences demonstrating the multiple structural changes of the brain in IAD subjects. VBM results indicated the decreased gray matter volume in the bilateral dorsolateral prefrontal cortex (DLPFC), the supplementary motor area (SMA), the orbitofrontal cortex (OFC), the cerebellum and the left rostral ACC (rACC)."

UCLA professor of psychiatry Gary Small studied brain activity in experienced web surfers versus casual web surfers. He used MRI scans on both groups to evaluate brain activity. The study showed that when Internet surfing, the brain activity of the experienced Internet users was far more extensive than that of the novices, particularly in areas of the prefrontal cortex associated with problem-solving and decision making. However, the two groups had no significant differences in brain activity when reading blocks of text. This evidence suggested that the distinctive neural pathways of experienced Web users had developed because of their Web use. Dr. Small concluded that "The current explosion of digital technology not only is changing the way we live and communicate, but is rapidly and profoundly altering our brains."

=== Effect on traditional reading ===
In an August 2008 article in The Atlantic ("Is Google Making Us Stupid?"), Nicholas Carr experientially asserts that using the Internet can lead to lower attention span and make it more difficult to read in the traditional sense (that is, read a book at length without mental interruptions). He says that he and his friends have found it more difficult to concentrate and read whole books, even though they read a great deal when they were younger (that is, when they did not have access to the Internet). This assertion is based on anecdotal evidence, not controlled research.

Researchers from the University College London have done a 5-year study on Internet habits, and have found that people using the sites exhibited "a form of skimming activity," hopping from one source to another and rarely returning to any source they'd already visited. The 2008 report says, "It is clear that users are not reading online in the traditional sense; indeed there are signs that new forms of "reading" are emerging as users "power browse" horizontally through titles, contents pages and abstracts going for quick wins. It almost seems that they go online to avoid reading in the traditional sense."

== Brain power ==
Research suggests that using the Internet helps boost brain power for middle-aged and older people (research on younger people has not been done). The study compares brain activity when the subjects were reading and when the subjects were surfing the Internet. It found that Internet surfing uses much more brain activity than reading does. Lead researcher Professor Gary Small said: "The study results are encouraging, that emerging computerized technologies may have physiological effects and potential benefits for middle-aged and older adults. Internet searching engages complicated brain activity, which may help exercise and improve brain function."

== Productivity ==
One of the most widely debated effects of social networking has been its influence on productivity. In many schools and workplaces, social media sites are blocked because employers believe their employees will be distracted and unfocused on the sites. It seems, at least from one study, that employers do, indeed, have reason to be concerned. A survey from Hearst Communications found that productivity levels of people that used social networking sites were 1.5% lower than those that did not. Logically, people cannot get work done when they are performing other tasks. If the employees suffer from degrading self-control, it will be even harder for them to get back to work and maintain productivity.

== Effects of social networking and behavior ==
Evgeny Morozov has said that social networking could be potentially harmful to people. He writes that they can destroy privacy, and notes that "Insurance companies have accessed their patients' Facebook accounts to try to disprove they have hard-to-verify health problems like depression; employers have checked social networking sites to vet future employees; university authorities have searched the web for photos of their students' drinking or smoking pot." He also said that the Internet also makes people more complacent and risk averse. He said that because much of the ubiquity of modern technology—cameras, recorders, and such—people may not want to act in unusual ways for fear of getting a bad name. People can see pictures and videos of you on the Internet, and this may make you act differently.

=== Effects of social media ===
Social media began in the form of generalized online communities. These online communities formed on websites like Geocities.com in 1994, Theglobe.com in 1995, and Tripod.com in 1995. Many of these early communities focused on social interaction by bringing people together through the use of chat rooms. The chat rooms encouraged users to share personal information, ideas, or even personal web pages. Later the social networking community Classmates took a different approach by simply having people link to each other by using their personal email addresses. By the late 1990s, social networking websites began to develop more advanced features to help users find and manage friends. These newer generation of social networking websites began to flourish with the emergence of SixDegrees.com in 1997, Makeoutclub in 2000, Hub Culture in 2002, and Friendster in 2002. However, the first profitable mass social networking website was the South Korean service, Cyworld. Cyworld initially launched as a blog-based website in 1999 and social networking features were added to the website in 2001. Other social networking websites emerged like Myspace in 2002, LinkedIn in 2003, and Bebo in 2005. In 2009, the social networking website Facebook (launched in 2004) became the largest social networking website in the world. Both Instagram and Kik were launched in October 2010. Active users of Facebook increased from just a million in 2004 to over 750 million by the year 2011. Making internet-based social networking both a cultural and financial phenomenon. In September 2011, Snapchat was launched and reported over 300 million users in 2021.

== Attention span ==
According to the New York Times, many scientists say that "people's ability to focus is being undermined by bursts of information".

From 53,573 page views taken from various users, 17% of the views lasted less than 4 seconds while 4% lasted more than 10 minutes. In regards to page content, users will only read 49% of a site that contains 111 words or fewer while users will opt to read 28% of an average website (approximately 593 words). For each additional 100 words on a site, users will spend 4.4 seconds longer on the site.

It is found that those who read articles online go through the article more thoroughly than those who read from print-based materials. Upon choosing their reading material, online readers read 77% of the content, which can be compared to broadsheet newspaper where the corresponding number is 62%.

== Effects of anonymity ==
Interacting on the Internet mostly does not involve "physical" interactions with another person (i.e. face-to-face conversation), and therefore easily leads to a person feeling free to act differently online, as well as unrestraint in civility and minimization of authority, etc.

People who are socially anxious are more likely to use electronic communication as their only means of communication. This, in turn, makes them more likely to disclose personal information to strangers online that they normally wouldn't give out face-to-face. The phenomenon is a likely cause for the prevalence of cyberbullying, especially for children who do not understand "social networking etiquette."

Internet anonymity can lead to online disinhibition, in which people do and say things online that they normally wouldn't do or say in person. Psychology researcher John Suler differentiates between benign disinhibition in which people can grow psychologically by revealing secret emotions, fears, and wishes and showing unusual acts of kindness and generosity and toxic disinhibition, in which people use rude language, harsh criticisms, anger, hatred and threats or visit pornographic or violent sites that they wouldn't in the 'real world.'

== Internet addiction ==
People become addicted or dependent on the Internet through excessive computer use that interferes with daily life. Kimberly S. Young links internet addiction disorder with existing mental health issues, most commonly depression. Young states that the disorder has significant effects socially, psychologically and occupationally.

Social media use has been proposed as a distinct form of internet-related addictive behaviour, though it is not recognised as a disorder in the DSM-5 or the ICD-11. In a 2025 review, Moretta and Wegmann proposed diagnostic criteria for social media use disorder adapted from those for substance use, gambling and gaming disorders, while noting that the criteria have yet to be validated in clinical populations.

"Aric Sigman's presentation to members of the Royal College of Paediatrics and Child Health outlined the parallels between screen dependency and alcohol and drug addiction: the instant stimulation provided by all those flickering graphics leads to the release of dopamine, a chemical that's central to the brain's reward system".

A 2009 study suggested that brain structural changes were present in those classified by the researchers as Internet addicted, similar to those classified as chemically addicted.

In one study, the researchers selected seventeen subjects with online gaming addiction and another seventeen naive internet users who rarely used the internet. Using a magnetic resonance imaging scanner, they performed a scan to "acquire 3-dimensional T1-weighted images" of the subject's brain. The results of the scan revealed that online gaming addiction "impairs gray and white matter integrity in the orbitofrontal cortex of the prefrontal regions of the brain". According to Keath Low, psychotherapist, the orbitofrontal cortex "has a major impact on our ability to perform such tasks as planning, prioritizing, paying attention to and remembering details, and controlling our attention". As a result, Keith Low believes that these online gaming addicts are incapable of prioritizing their life or setting a goal and accomplishing it because of the impairment of their orbitofrontal cortex.

== Escapism ==
Ease of access to the Internet can increase escapism in which a user uses the Internet as an "escape" from the perceived unpleasant or banal aspects of daily/real life. Because the internet and virtual realities easily satisfy social needs and drives, according to Jim Blascovich and Jeremy Bailenson, "sometimes [they are] so satisfying that addicted users will withdraw physically from society." Stanford psychiatrist Dr. Elias Aboujaoude believes that advances in virtual reality and immersive 3-D have led us to "where we can have a 'full life' [online] that can be quite removed from our own." Eventually, virtual reality may drastically change a person's social and emotional needs. "We may stop 'needing' or craving real social interactions because they may become foreign to us," Aboujaoude says.

Escapism is mainly distinguished as Self-Suppression and Self-Expansion. In the context of the psychological effects of the internet, Self-Suppression is related to Internet Gaming Disorder and generally is found to result in negative psychological effects and avoidance coping. Self-Expansion, in contrast, is usually found to result in positive psychological effects and approach coping.

Psychological distress has been found to influence and increase escapism. Escapism, in turn, increases the likelihood of internet addiction, compulsive internet use, gaming addiction, and further harmful consequences.

== Effects on children ==
Internet has its impact on all age groups from elders to children. According to the article 'Digital power: exploring the effects of social media on children's spirituality', children consider the Internet as their third place after home and school.

One of the main effects social media has had on children is the effect of cyber bullying. A study carried out by 177 students in Canada found that "15% of the students admitted that they cyberbullied others" while "40% of the cyber victims had no idea who the bullies were". The psychological harm cyber bullying can cause is reflected in low self-esteem, depression and anxiety. It also opens up avenues for manipulation and control. Cyber bullying has ultimately led to depression, anxiety and in severe cases suicide. Suicide is the third leading cause of death for youth between the ages of 10 and 24. Cyber bullying is rapidly increasing. Some writers have suggested monitoring and educating children from a young age about the risks associated with cyber bullying.

Children use, on average, 27 hours of internet a week and it is on the increase. This leads to an increased risk of insomnia.

Screen time is affecting children in many ways, not only are children at an increased risk of insomnia but they are also at risk of having eye and health developing problems. A study done in 2018 showed that young children are experiencing Computer Vision Syndrome, also referred to as Digital Eye Strain symptoms which include blurred or double vision, headaches, eye fatigue, and more. Many kids are having to wear glasses at a younger age due to excessive amount of screentime. Health problems are also a big effect of the internet. The National Longitudinal Study of Adolescent Health did a study on adolescents ranging from 7-12 grade and they found that more screen time increases the risk of obesity. Reducing the amount of time children spend on the Internet can prevent development of diseases like obesity and diabetes.

== Effects on parenting ==
"A psychologist, Aric Sigman, warned of the perils of "passive parenting" and "benign neglect" caused by parent's reliance on gadgets". In some cases, parents' internet addictions can have drastic effects on their children. In 2009, a three-year-old girl from New Mexico died of malnutrition and dehydration on the same day that her mother was said to have spent 15 hours playing World of Warcraft online. In another case in 2014, a Korean couple became so immersed in a video game that allowed them to raise a virtual child online that they let their real baby die. The effects of the Internet on parenting can be observed in a how parents utilize the Internet, the response to their child's Internet consumption, as well as the effects and influences that the Internet has on the relationship between parent and child.

=== Parental Internet use and opinions towards family impact ===
Overall, parents are seen to do simple tasks such as sending e-mails and keep up with current events whereas social networking sites are less frequented. In regards to researching parental material, a study conducted in January 2012 by the University of Minnesota found that 75% of questioned parents have stated that the Internet improves their method of obtaining parenting related information, 19.7% found parenting websites too complex to navigate, and 13.1% of the group did not find any useful parenting information on any website.

Many studies have shown that parents view the Internet as a hub of information especially in their children's education. They feel that it is a valuable commodity that can enhance their learning experience and when used in this manner it does not contribute to any family tension or conflicts. However, when the Internet is used as a social medium (either online gaming or social networking sites) there is a positive correlation between the use of the Internet and family conflicts. In conjunction with using the Internet for social means, there is a risk of exposing familial information to strangers, which is perceived to parents as a threat and can ultimately weaken family boundaries.

=== Parental response to child online consumption ===
A report released in October 2012 by Ofcom focused on the amount of online consumption done by children aged 5–15 and how the parents react to their child's consumption. Of the parents interviewed, 85% use a form of online mediation ranging from face-to-face talks with their children about online surfing to cellphone browser filters. The remaining 15% of parents do not take active measures to adequately inform their children of safe Internet browsing; these parents have either spoken only briefly to their children about cautious surfing or do not do anything at all.

Parents are active in monitoring their child's online use by using methods such as investigating the browsing history and by regulating Internet usage. However, since parents are less versed in Internet usage than their children they are more concerned with the Internet interfering with family life than online matters such as child grooming or cyber-bullying.

When addressing those with lack of parental control over the Internet, parents state that their child is rarely alone (defined for children from 5–11 years old) or that they trust their children when they are online (for children 12–15 years old). Approximately 80% of parents ensure that their child has been taught Internet safety from school and 70% of parents feel that the benefits of using the Internet are greater than the risks that come along with it.

Conversely an American study, conducted by PewInternet released on 20 November 2012, reveal that parents are highly concerned about the problems the Internet can impose on their teenage children. 47% of parents are tend to worry about their children being exposed to inappropriate material on the Internet and 45% of the parents are concerned about their children's behaviour towards each other both online offline. Only 31% of parents showed concern about the Internet taking away social time from the family.

=== Effects of Internet use on parent-child relationships ===
Researcher Sanford Grossbart and others explores the relationship between the mother and child and how Internet use affects this relationship. This study forms its basis around Marvin Sussman and Suzanne Steinmetz's idea that the relationship between parent and child is highly influenced by the changing experiences and events of each generation. "Parental warmth" is a factor in how receptive a parent is to being taught the nuances of the Internet by their child versus the traditional method of the parent influencing the child. If the parent displayed "warm" tendencies she was more open to learning how to use the Internet from their child even if the parent happened to be more knowledgeable on the subject. This fosters teaching in a positive environment, which sustains a strong relationship between mother and child, encourages education, and promotes mature behaviour. "Cooler" mothers only allowed themselves to be taught if they thought that their child held the same amount of knowledge or greater and would dismiss the teaching otherwise suggesting a relationship that stems from the majority of influence coming from the parent.

However, despite warm and cool parenting methods, parents who encounter a language barrier rely more heavily on their children to utilize the Internet. Vikki Katz of Rutgers University has studied the interaction between immigrant parents and children and how they use technology. Katz notes that the majority resources that immigrants find helpful are located online, however the search algorithms currently in place do not direct languages other than English appropriately. Because of this shortcoming, parents strongly encourage their bilingual children to bridge the gap between the Internet and language.

The Internet is increasingly being used as a virtual babysitter when parents actively download applications specifically for their children with intentions to keep them calm. A survey conducted by Ipsos has found that half of the interviewed parents believe children ages 8–13 are old enough to own or carry smartphones thus increasing online content consumption in younger generations.

== Criticism ==
One criticism by Ame Orben and Andrew Przybylski is that because studies regarding technology use and wellbeing have "many variables and observations" researchers have a lot of room in how they define concepts such as digital technology use or wellbeing.

== See also ==
- Cyberpsychology
- Digital media use and mental health
- Millennials
