= Stultification =

Stultification (from Latin stultus stupid) refers to the state of being or a situation or an action causing one to become

- stupid or
- foolish or
- unsound

The silent implication of stultification in neurobiological terms is that certain external influences can have a lasting neural effect (reduction of the number of synapses, reduced number of interconnections between brain areas, less efficient signal transmission, etc). Such effects are studied by biopsychologists and psychosomatic medicine.

== See also ==
- Dementia
- DSM-5
- Is Google Making Us Stupid?
- Moron
