= Wynford Dore =

British businessman and author (born 1949)

Wynford Newman Dore
- Born: 10 June 1949 (age 77); Tongwynlais, South Wales
- Years active: 1967–present
- Organizations: Nullifire; Education Development International; Brigade Clothing; Zing Performance; Arnold Lodge School
- Website: wynforddore.com

Wynford Newman Dore (born 1949) is a British businessman and author. He made his fortune in fire retardant intumescent coatings as the founder of Nullifire, and later co-founded the Coventry-based awarding body Education Development International (EDI). He is best known for developing the Dore Programme, a controversial exercise-based treatment that was promoted as a remedy for dyslexia, attention deficit hyperactivity disorder (ADHD) and developmental coordination disorder by now-liquidated enterprise DDAT (Dyslexia, Dyspraxia and Attention Deficit Treatment). He has also authored books on the subject, including Dyslexia: The Miracle Cure.

== Early life ==
Wynford Dore was born in 1949 in Tongwynlais, South Wales, and was brought up in Coventry, England, where his family settled in search of work. He gained a scholarship to King Henry VIII School but left school at the age of 14 with a single O-level. In 1967, he became a computer systems analyst at Jaguar Cars in Coventry.

== Business career ==
=== Nullifire ===
In the early 1970s, Dore identified a commercial opportunity created by new fire safety legislation in the United Kingdom and began developing and marketing fire-retardant paint. He founded Nullifire Ltd in 1973, a manufacturer of fire protection coatings and supplier of thin-film intumescent coatings for structural steel. The business made him a millionaire; he sold it in 1998 to the American speciality coatings group RPM International.

=== Education businesses ===
After selling Nullifire, Dore turned to the education sector. Working with his cousin Gareth Newman, a former principal of a city technology college, he conceived the assessment business GOAL, which was later renamed Education Development International plc. The Coventry-based company became a vocational awarding organisation offering more than 400 qualifications in the United Kingdom and specialising in on-screen assessment and work-based training. It was acquired by Pearson plc in 2011.

Dore has also held interests in independent schooling. He was chairman of governors of Abbotsford School in Kenilworth between 1983 and 1994, and is a shareholder and chairman of Newman Schools Limited. In 1999, he and Gareth Newman acquired Arnold Lodge School in Royal Leamington Spa, Warwickshire, an independent school founded in 1864. In 2023, the pair took over Stratford Preparatory School in Stratford-upon-Avon, a school for children aged two to eleven that had been led for more than three decades by its principal Catherine Quinn.

== Dore Programme ==
=== Origins and launch ===
Dore's interest in learning difficulties grew from the experience of his daughter Susie, who was diagnosed with dyslexia at the age of nine and whom he later described as having been "underachieving, frustrated, depressed" into adulthood. After selling Nullifire, he funded research into dyslexia and, in 2000, opened a treatment centre in Kenilworth, Warwickshire, trading as DDAT (Dyslexia, Dyspraxia and Attention Deficit Treatment).

The programme rejected conventional literacy tuition in favour of twice-daily exercise routines, typically lasting about ten minutes, involving wobble boards, bean-bag catching and eye-tracking tasks. It was based on the hypothesis that dyslexia, ADHD and dyspraxia result from delayed development of the cerebellum, and that stimulating it could make learned skills automatic. Assessment involved posturography, oculomotor tests and dyslexia screening. Dore commissioned an evaluation from David Reynolds, then professor of education at the University of Exeter, and worked with a local general practitioner, Roy Rutherford, who became the company's medical director.

=== Expansion and promotion ===
Dore opened Dore Achievement Centres in the United Kingdom, the United States, Australia, New Zealand, South Africa, Hong Kong, and Barbados. For marketing, he relied on personal testimony and celebrity endorsements, mostly from the rugby union internationals Kenny Logan and Scott Quinnell, both of whom said the programme had helped them with dyslexia.

The programme's evidence base was contested from the outset. The British Dyslexia Association and the Dyslexia Institute urged caution, the Institute's director Shirley Cramer warning that claims dyslexia might be eradicated within a decade amounted to "a massive claim based on little evidence" and that "parents are very vulnerable". It was criticised for lacking rigorous methodology, particularly the absence of randomized, double-blind control groups. When a study favorable to the Dore program was published in the journal Dyslexia in 2006, five members of the journal's editorial board resigned in protest, citing severe methodological flaws in the research and financial conflicts of interest. A review published in the Australasian Journal of Special Education evaluated the commercialization and evidence base of the method, concluding that "none of the necessary desiderata to substantiate claims for a cure are met by the available scientific evidence for the efficacy of the Dore program."

Broadcast and advertising regulators intervened on several occasions. The Independent Television Commission upheld complaints about the 2002 Tonight with Trevor McDonald edition, observing that broadcasters bore "particular responsibility to contextualise material in such a way as to minimise the risk of misleading viewers", and a further complaint was upheld the following year in relation to Richard & Judy.

=== Collapse ===
In May 2008, the DDAT company went into liquidation in the UK. The following month, "The Dore Group", which operated 13 clinics across Australia, went into voluntary administration. The sudden financial collapse resulted in the closure of the clinics, leaving parents who had paid thousands of dollars in upfront fees out of pocket and patients with incomplete programs.

Dore subsequently adapted the program's balance exercises into an online format, which currently operates under the name Zing Performance Ltd.

== Bibliography ==
- Dore, Wynford (2006). Dyslexia: The Miracle Cure
- Dore, Wynford (2006). Opening the Dore on ADD/ADHD: The Miracle Cure
- Dore, Wynford (2008). Dyslexia and ADHD: The Miracle Cure
- Dore, Wynford (2018). Stop Struggling in School

== Personal life ==
Dore has four children: Susie, Rosie, Glyn and Gareth.

== See also ==
- Barbara Arrowsmith Young
