= Linda Siegel =

Linda Siegel may refer to:

- Linda Siegel (psychologist)
- Linda Siegel (tennis)
