= Caroline Bowen =

New Zealand speech therapist

Caroline Bowen AM
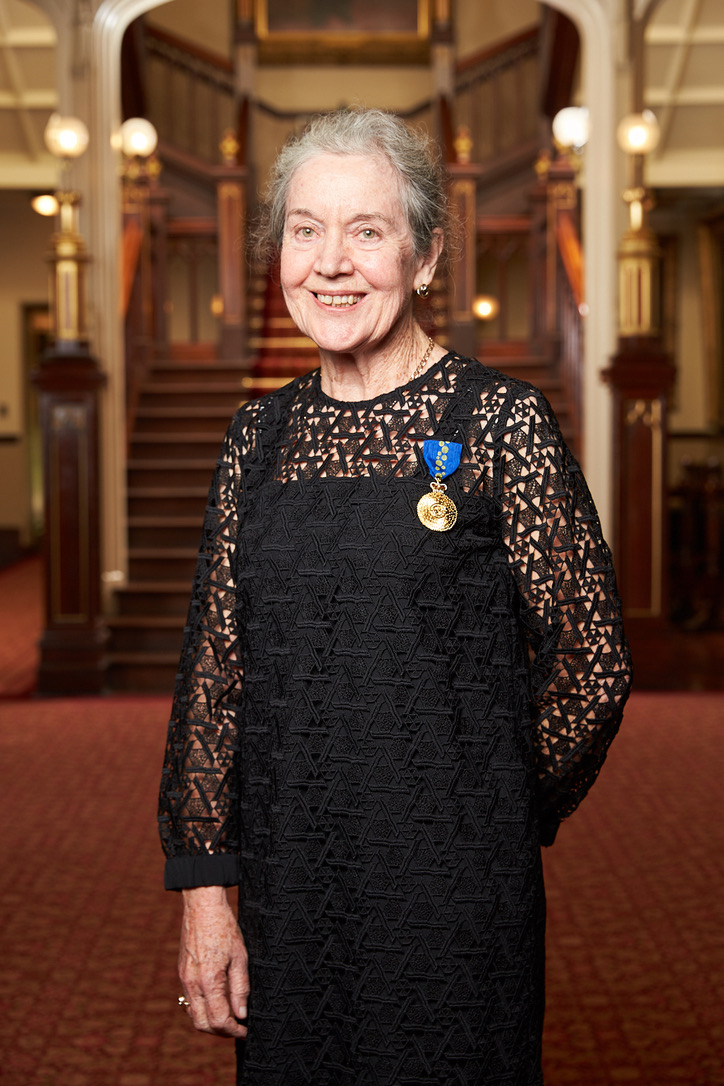
- Bowen at the Order of Australia investiture ceremony, Government House, Sydney on May 4, 2018
- Born: 4 December 1944 (age 81); Nelson, New Zealand
- Occupation: Speech-Language Pathologist

Academic background
- Education: Macquarie University
- Thesis: Evaluation of a phonological therapy in treated and untreated groups of young children (1996)

Academic work
- Discipline: Clinical Phonology; Children's speech sound disorders
- Sub-discipline: Articulation disorder, phonological disorder, childhood apraxia of speech (CAS)
- Institutions: University of Technology Sydney; University of KwaZulu-Natal

Caroline Bowen AM (born 4 December 1944) is a speech pathologist who was born in New Zealand, and who has lived and worked in Australia most of her life. She specialises in children's speech sound disorders. Her clinical career as a speech-language pathologist spanned 42 years from 1970 to 2011.

== Biography ==
Bowen studied speech therapy in Melbourne, graduating from the Victorian School of Speech and Hearing Science with a LACST (Licentiate of the Australian College of Speech Therapists, a forerunner of the Australian Association of Speech and Hearing, later to become Speech Pathology Australia) in 1970, and received her PhD degree in 1996 from Macquarie University, Australia. She also has qualifications in Speech and Drama from Trinity College London (ATCL performer 1964; LTCL teaching 1966) and a diploma in Family Therapy (1989) from the now disbanded Family Therapy Institute of Australia.

She has worked extensively across Australia, Ireland and the UK and is regarded as an international expert in both clinical fields of children's speech sound disorders and in the use of technology to improve speech pathology practice. She is an Adjunct Fellow in Speech Pathology at the University of Technology Sydney, and an Honorary Research Fellow in Speech-Language Pathology at the University of KwaZulu-Natal in South Africa.

In 2008 Bowen was elected as a fellow the American Speech–Language–Hearing Association. In 2011 she was made a life member of Speech Pathology Australia and in 2014 became an honorary fellow of the Royal College of Speech and Language Therapists. She is the only Australian, and only speech-language pathologist, to be awarded high honours by all three of these professional organisations.

Dr Bowen's other professional interests include evidence-based practice; the role of families in speech-language pathology intervention; developmental language disorder; the impact of treatment fads, complementary and alternative medicine and pseudoscience on clinical and education practice (e.g., the Arrowsmith Program, Brain Gym, Facilitated Communication, Irlen, Gestalt Language Processing / Natural Language Acquisition GLP/NLA, Learning Styles, the Rapid Prompting Method, Whole Language, etc.); and the application of information and communication technology, including social media, for professional purposes. Dr Bowen has also been a pioneer in the use of the Internet in Speech Pathology. Her own website and her Phonological Therapy listserv (2001-2019) have facilitated worldwide communication of the highest standard within the profession.

She consulted on the 2010 film The King's Speech, the 2010 book of the same title by Lionel Logue's grandson Mark Logue with co-author Peter Conradi, and the 2010 book Lionel Logue – The King's Mentor by Norman C. Hutchinson.

She is the child speech and language development consultant for the Bing TV series.

In 2018 she was appointed an honorary Member of the Order of Australia in the Australia Day Honours.

== Selected publications ==
- Bowen, C. 2011 (February). "On the trail of Lionel Logue: One SLP's excellent adventure", ASHA Leader 16. doi:10.1044/leader.FTR10.16022011.np
- McLeod, S. Verdon, S. and Bowen, C. 2013. "International aspirations for speech-language pathologists’ practice with multilingual children with speech sound disorders: Development of a position paper", Journal of Communication Disorders 46(4). 375–387. doi:10.1016/j.jcomdis.2013.04.003.
- Bowen, C. 2023. Children's Speech Sound Disorders (3rd Edition). Wiley-Blackwell. ISBN 978-1-119-74316-3.
- Bowen, C. and Snow, P. 2017. Making Sense of Interventions for Children with Developmental Disorders. J & R Press. ISBN 978-1-907826-32-0.
