= Information grazing =

Information grazing refers to the ability to quickly obtain knowledge and facts just in time to solve new problems or answer questions. "Information grazing" can also be "information jumping", jumping from site to site and cherry-picking information seems to "rewire" the brain to deleterious effects or focus on something long enough to fully understand all its implications.

Unlike traditional learning, where learning a subject in depth was necessary to draw enough pertinent knowledge to solve new problems or answer questions, information grazing assumes some subjects are so large, fast-changing, interdependent, or esoteric, that traditional methods of learning may be unable to solve new problems or answer questions as efficiently. Information grazing is also one of the most commonly used coping techniques for stress and experts have noticed a trend with people many under the age of 35.

The change from a traditional in-depth learning and memorizing of facts to a mentality of quickly finding, using, and then forgetting knowledge, stems from the technological singularity concept that information is growing so fast (see information explosion or information overload) that an individual can no longer hope to be a "renaissance man" or effectively keep up with some fields of knowledge. Examples of fields of knowledge that are more susceptible to information grazing techniques are science, medical, and engineering, where the “newest” knowledge has become so dynamic, that documentation and dissemination has increasingly moved from fixed paper media to digital formats allowing easier updating and searchability using tools such as AI. With the advent of the Internet and modern computer-cataloging of libraries, vast sums of knowledge are easily accessible in overwhelming quantities in real time. And, with expected future advances in search engine technology and library services, the trend of information overload is expected to worsen; information grazing techniques will become more prevalent to deal with the overload.

Disadvantages of information grazing come from its advantages. Switching from a "fixed" source of information that is constant, verifiable, and worth memorizing to "fluid" sources that are always in flux can lead to quick solutions that are unverified or worse, incorrect. Studies have shown that many people don't read past the first sentences of a Web site's content, and many never go beyond the first ten links listed in a search. As information becomes more like an instantaneous consumable item, memorization is less fact-based but more procedural (i.e. how to find it). Similar concepts are found in Japanese education where after intense study of many unconnected facts, most of the information is forgotten or if remembered, not connected to other relevant facts. In the US, this is similar to cramming an exam. Information grazing may have the same effect but greater, since it is done over the period of years.

== See also ==
- SparkNotes, often used to "read" books in a few minutes.
- Browsing
- The Cult of the Amateur
- Is Google Making Us Stupid?
- Large language model
