= The Ice Twins =

2015 novel by S. K. Tremayne

First edition (publ. HarperCollins)

The Ice Twins is a 2015 psychological thriller, written by S. K. Tremayne (a pen name of British author and journalist Sean Thomas). Screenwriter Isaac Adamson has adapted the novel for a film.

== Plot ==
The novel describes the troubled lives of Sarah and Angus Moorcroft who lose one of their young twin daughters in an accident. A year after the tragedy, Angus and Sarah decide to take their surviving twin, Kirstie, to live on a small island off Skye, in Scotland. Just before the family's move to Scotland, Kirstie claims she is, in fact, her identical twin sister Lydia, supposedly dead.

== Reception ==
The novel was an international bestseller, reaching number 1 on the Sunday Times list, in the UK; it spent several months on bestseller lists in Germany, the Netherlands, Finland, Denmark, South Korea, Brazil, and elsewhere.
