= Anne Castles =

Australian cognitive scientist

Anne Castles FASSA FRSN
- Born: Canberra, Australia
- Education: Australian National University; Macquarie University
- Scientific career
- Fields: Cognitive science
- Workplaces: Macquarie University
- Academic advisors: Max Coltheart

Anne Castles is a cognitive scientist of reading and language, with a particular focus on reading development and developmental dyslexia.

== Early life ==
Castles was born in Canberra, Australia and attended St Clare's College, Canberra, finishing in 1982. She later moved to Sydney.

== Education ==
Castles completed her honours degree in psychology at the Australian National University in 1987 and her PhD thesis at Macquarie University in 1993. Max Coltheart acknowledged her contribution to his own studies in learning to read and developmental dyslexia.

== Research ==
Castles then commenced teaching and research at the University of Melbourne in the Department of Psychology. Returning to Macquarie University in 2007, she took up a CORE research appointment at MACCS, and in 2010, she was appointed Scientific Director of the Macquarie Centre for Cognitive Science and then became Head of the Department of Cognitive Science.

Castles is a member of the Council of Learning Difficulties Australia, Fellow of the Academy of Social Science in Australia (FASSA), and Chair of the Steering Committee of the NSW Centre for Effective Reading. Castles research over more than 20 years has looked into the nature, causes, and treatment of different types of reading difficulties, as well as the process of normal reading development. She has published over 100 articles and several books. She is also a Fellow of the Royal Society of New South Wales (FRSN).

Castles has been critical of the Arrowsmith Program, which has been incorporated in public and private schools in Canada, the United States, Australia, and New Zealand, and is claimed to help students with learning disabilities by using research in neuroplasticity theories. Castles has stated that there is "a clear lack of independent research to support the program's claims", and no study has been published in a peer-reviewed journal on the Arrowsmith program.

Castles is on the editorial board of the academic journal, Scientific Studies of Reading, and has produced the Free Reading Assessment Tests for teachers. She has also provided extensive discussion in the media on the issue of dyslexia in school children's learning.

== Works ==
- Castles, A., & Nation, K. (Eds.). (2008). Orthographic Processes in Reading. Special issue of the Journal of Research in Reading. Oxford: Blackwell Publishing
- Friedmann, Naama; Castles, Anne (1 August 2013). "Impairment: Written Language". In Khan, Geoffrey (ed.). Encyclopedia of Hebrew Language and Linguistics. Vol. 2. Leiden: Brill. p. 236. ISBN 978-90-04-17642-3. Archived from the original on 12 April 2023.
- Castles, A. & Nation, K. (2006). How does orthographic learning happen? In Andrews, S. (Ed.), From inkmarks to ideas: Challenges and controversies about word recognition and reading (pp. 151–179). London, UK: Psychology Press.
- Castles, A., Davis, C. & Forster, K.I. (2003). Word recognition development in children: Insights from masked priming. In Kinoshita. S. & Lupker, S. (Eds.), Masked priming: State of the Art (pp. 345–360). London, UK: Psychology Press.
- Coltheart, M. Bates, A. and Castles, A. (1994). Cognitive neuropsychology and rehabilitation. In Humphreys, G.W. & Riddoch, M.J. (Eds.), Cognitive Neuropsychology and Cognitive Rehabilitation. London: Lawrence Erlbaum.
