= Smart Moves =

1995 book by Carla Hannaford

Smart Moves: Why Learning Is Not All In Your Head
- First edition
- Author: Carla Hannaford
- Language: English
- Genre: Psychology; Learning
- Publisher: Great River Books
- Publication date: 1995
- Publication place: United States
- Media type: Print (Paperback)
- Pages: 237 p.
- ISBN: 0-915556-37-5
- OCLC: 32820701
- Dewey Decimal: 612.8 20
- LC Class: QP408 .H36 1995

The book Smart Moves: Why Learning Is Not All In Your Head was written in 1995 by neurophysiologist and educator Carla Hannaford (revised and enlarged second edition published in 2005), and includes an introduction by neuroscientist Candace Pert.

In Smart Moves, Hannaford looks at the body's roles in thinking and learning, citing research from child development, physiology, and neuroscience. Hannaford examines the ways that sensorimotor experiences affect short and long-term memory from infancy through adulthood, and argues that movement is crucial to learning.

Hannaford discusses the relationship between different brain areas and learning, along with the interaction between the brain, body, and environment.

She highlights the importance of movement and play in learning activities, discussing the importance of sensorimotor development (visual, auditory, tactile, and kinesthetic readiness) to the learning process. Her findings and research are identified as Brain Gym activities.

The book also discusses how emotions and stress impact learning in both children and adults, introducing the term 'SOSOH' (Stressed Out, Survival-Oriented Humans) to describe individuals facing learning challenges or attention difficulties, suggesting a link between stress and learning impediments such as ADD and ADHD.

Hannaford suggests in her book strategies for improving learning, such as dietary changes, incorporating physical movement, and creating supportive environments for those with learning challenges

== See also ==
- Stress: General adaptation syndrome
- Perceptual learning
- Vision training
