= Max Coltheart =

Australian cognitive scientist

Max Coltheart AM (born 16 April 1939) is an Australian cognitive scientist who specialises in cognitive neuropsychology and cognitive neuropsychiatry.

Coltheart was born in Frankston, Victoria and grew up in Brisbane, Canberra and Bega. He commenced a Bachelor of Arts at the University of Sydney in 1957, and completed MA and PhD degrees there, then went on to a succession of academic posts including at the University of Sydney, 1965-1967, Monash University, 1967-1969, University of Waterloo, Canada 1969-1972) and the University of London. He was Reader in Psychology at the University of Reading 1972-1975 and Professor of Psychology at Birkbeck College London University from 1975 to 1987. In 1987 he took up the position of Professor of Psychology in the Psychology Department of Macquarie University.

Coltheart was appointed scientific director of the Macquarie Centre for Cognitive Science in 2000, and maintained this position until 2009. He was awarded an ARC Federation Fellowship in 2002 and in 2010 was appointed Emeritus Professor of Cognitive Science at Macquarie University. He is also a fellow of the Australian Academy of Science and the Academy of the Social Sciences in Australia and a Corresponding Fellow of the British Academy. He is currently a chief investigator in the Australian Research Council's Centre of Excellence for Cognition and its Disorders at Macquarie University. Among his prominent students is Anne Castles.

He is noted for developing the "dual-route" theory of reading) in the late 1970s and the two-factor theory of delusional belief in the 2000s as well as contributions to the debate about what can be learned about cognition from functional neuroimaging work

Coltheart received a Centenary Medal on 1 January 2001 "For service to Australian society and science in cognitive neuropsychology'. He was appointed Member of the Order of Australia (AM) in the 2010 Australia Day Honours "For service to cognitive psychology as a researcher and academic, and to people with learning difficulties".
