= Hieronimo Squarciafico =

Venetian editor

Hieronimo Squarciafico was a 15th-century Venetian editor, who worked for the Italian humanist and printer Aldus Manutius, the founder of the Aldine Press at Venice. Squarciafico is best known for bemoaning the printing press in an aphorism that reads as a pithy summation of his contemporaries' concerns over the spread of printed works: "Abundance of books makes men less studious". Initially, in 1477, he wrote enthusiastically about the works he was engaged in having printed. Yet, a few years later, in 1481, Squarciafico appeared to hold a more skeptical view when he imagined a discussion between the spirits of the great authors of the past being held in the Elysian Fields in which some of them lauded the craft of printing; while others complained that "printing had fallen into the hands of unlettered men, who corrupted almost everything"; and yet still others lamented that "their works would perish if they were not printed, since this art compels all writers to give way to it".

Squarciafico remains relevant today in criticisms of modern electronic culture; he has, in recent times, been quoted by theologian Walter J. Ong and technology critic Nicholas G. Carr, among others.

== Bibliography ==
- Ong, Walter J. (1982), Orality and Literacy: The Technologizing of the Word, London: Methuen Publishing
- Lowry, Martin J.C. (1979), The World of Aldus Manutius: Business and Scholarship in Renaissance Venice, Ithaca, N.Y.: Cornell University Press
