= Linda Siegel (psychologist) =

American-born psychologist and academic

Linda S. Siegel
- Born: 1942 (age 83–84); Washington, DC
- Education: Yale University
- Scientific career
- Fields: Cognitive Science
- Workplaces: University of British Columbia

Linda S. Siegel (born 1942) is an American-born psychologist and academic known for her research into the cognitive aspects of learning disabilities. She is Professor Emeritus in the Department of Educational and Counselling Psychology, and Special Education at the University of British Columbia in Vancouver, Canada where she held the Dorothy C. Lam Chair in Special Education.

== Biography ==
In 1942, Siegel was born in Washington, DC, but grew up in New York City, where her family moved when she was six years old.

In 1963, Siegel received her BA from Queens College, City University of New York. She went on to post-graduate work at Yale University, where she received her MS in 1964, followed by the PhD in 1966. Her doctoral dissertation was on information processing in children.

In the 1980s, Siegel's earliest research on human information processing became increasingly focused on developmental disabilities, especially reading disability. Many of her best-known papers are on the relationship between IQ and reading disability classification. Her research on that relationship has at times proven controversial.

Siegel held posts at: the University of Missouri in Columbia; Department of Psychiatry McMaster University Medical Centre, in Hamilton, Ontario; and Ontario Institute for Studies in Education in Toronto.

In 1996, Siegel was appointed to the Dorothy C. Lam Chair in Special Education at the University of British Columbia.

In 2004, Siegel was awarded an Honorary Doctorate from the University of Gothenburg in Sweden and held the university's Kerstin Hesselgren Visiting Professorship for the academic year 2004/2005.

In 2008, Siegel appeared in Fixing My Brain (2008), a CBC documentary, about the Arrowsmith program, although a portion of her highly critical commentary was removed prior to broadcast after Arrowsmith Young's lawyers threatened the CBC with a lawsuit.

In 2010, Siegel was awarded the Canadian Psychological Association Gold Medal for Distinguished Lifetime Contributions to Canadian Psychology,

In 2012, Siegel became the first recipient of the Australian Journal of Learning Difficulties Eminent Researcher Award.

In her paper "Confessions and Reflections of the Black Sheep of the Learning Disabilities Field" (2012), Siegel presented evidence from her long-term research to support her contention "that the IQ score is unnecessary in the diagnosis of whether or not there is a learning disability". She also criticized as "very regressive", trends to demand testing for "'processing deficits', even though there is no evidence that processing deficits are useful for either diagnosis or remediation" of learning disabilities.

In 2013, Pacific Educational Press published Siegel's most recent book, Understanding dyslexia and other learning disabilities (2013).

On January 27, 2022, the Ontario Human Rights Commission (OHRC) released a report on its public inquiry entitled Right to Read inquiry report, compiled with the expert assistance of Dr. Linda Siegel and Dr. Jamie Metsala.

== Research ==
Siegel has been one of several academics who have criticized studies supportive of "brain training" programs and especially the Arrowsmith program founded by Barbara Arrowsmith Young in 1978.

Works with overviews of Siegel's research include the Brueggemann Taylor book Diagnostic Assessment of Learning Disabilities in Childhood (2014) and an article by Hayman-Abello et al., "Human neuropsychology in Canada: The 1990s" (2003).

== See also ==
- Learning disabilities
