= Dore Programme =

Brain training program for learning, attention, and social difficulties

The Dore Method, also known as Zing Performance, is a method for improving skills such as reading and writing, attention and focus, social skills and sports performance through targeted physical exercises. It is named after its creator, businessman Wynford Dore.

The validity of the program has been disputed, as it has not been subject to any conclusive study that meets the criteria for a randomised controlled trial.

== Origin ==
Dore, previously known as DDAT (Dyslexia Dyspraxia Attention Treatment), was initiated by businessman Wynford Dore for his daughter Susie who was diagnosed as severely dyslexic and became depressed and suicidal. After being told that there was no cure for dyslexia, Wynford began working with a team of researchers to investigate Harold Levinson's claim that the cerebellum is linked to the types of symptoms Susie was experiencing. Roy Rutherford, a friend of Wynford's, suggested that an underdeveloped cerebellum may be the cause of Susie's symptoms. The Dore Programme was subsequently developed for Susie and, after she began to read and write, then made available to others.

According to a video released by Dore, conditions such as dyslexia, developmental coordination disorder, ADD, Autism, Asperger syndrome and ADHD are linked to cerebellar function. Dore Programme practitioners believe that it is possible to treat difficulties in areas such as reading, attention, coordination, and social skills by developing these neural pathways.

== The Dore method ==
The theory behind the Dore method is that skills such as reading and writing are learned through practice and become automatic because the cerebellum allows the learning process to occur at the maximum rate of efficiency. The Dore method alleges that, as skills become more automatic, the working memory required to perform a task decreases. The Dore Programme aims to stimulate the development of the cerebellum and hence to strengthen the communications between the cerebrum and cerebellum.

The Dore Programme stipulates that clients must be 7 years of age or older; younger clients would be more difficult to accurately assess. Adults of all ages are believed to be suitable for Dore.

== Dore Programme effectiveness ==
Uncertainty surrounds the Dore Programme's efficacy. 35 school-aged students at Balsall Common School in Warwickshire, UK, participated in the first study to assess the efficacy of the Dore Programme, which was published in Dyslexia in 2003. The study found that the students performed better on standardized tests in writing, reading, and comprehension. The majority of study participants had no diagnosed learning difficulties: six had dyslexia, two had developmental coordination disorder, and one had ADHD. The Dyslexia Screening Test identified some of the remaining children as 'at risk,' but the majority of children did not have severe difficulties. A follow-up to this study was published in Dyslexia in 2006, and the authors reported significant improvements in writing, reading, and comprehension, as well as ADHD attention skills, after re-evaluating the students.

Studies on efficacy with the target clinical groups have yet to be replicated in a peer-reviewed medical journal, and where control data are available, the evidence of gains in literacy associated with the Dore Programme needs to be further validated.

== Research ==
=== Of the treatment ===
The Dore Programme treatment has been studied and continues to be the subject of further research. The study by Reynolds et al. has been challenged. For example, a control group was included only for a subset of assessments, and not for follow up; little information was provided on the test scores or treatment status of children in the experimental group who were not followed up. The two authors of the research defended it as showing significant and maintained gains in coordination after treatment. A number of papers published in the British Dyslexia Association's journal have found the apparently independent academic research Dore initially offered in support of the treatment to be the subject of some debate. According to an article published in the Times Educational Supplement in 2004, many of Britain's foremost academics maintain that the results need to be replicated.

=== Into early claims ===
The UK's Independent Television Commission and Ofcom upheld complaints made about a 2002 news item on British television in which Sir Trevor McDonald hailed DDAT as a "breakthrough in the treatment of dyslexia." It repeated this decision about a later item on Richard & Judy, and found a television commercial made by DDAT to be in breach of Advertising Standards Code Rules for creating a false impression of the medical evidence, and implying that professional medical advice and support would be part of the treatment. In all these cases, however, they stated that: "the ITC does not express, nor does it seek to express, any view whatsoever on DDAT as an organisation or the relative efficacy of its treatment for dyslexia, neither of which was the subject of this finding." The complaints were mainly about claims that this was new and pioneering research when many elements date back to at least 30 years before the DDAT was founded.

=== Controversy ===
After the British journal Dyslexia published one paper about the Dore Programme in 2003, the paper was followed by ten critical commentaries and one commentator resigned from Dyslexia's editorial board. In 2006, five members of the board of directors resigned in protest of the publication of a follow-up article highly favorable of Dore, citing concerns about the methodology used in the study and financial conflicts of interest due to Dore's involvement in funding the research. The editor of Dyslexia defended the decision to publish, and the authors of the original Dore research paper responded vigorously to these criticisms and continued to support their findings and conclusions.

=== Advertising Standards Authority rules against Dore ===
In December 2009, the UK Advertising Standards Authority (ASA) ordered Dore to take down advertisements he had posted via Google Ads that claimed the program offered help for dyslexia, Asperger syndrome, and ADHD developmental coordination disorder. Dore attempted to defend the ads by citing two studies supporting its claims, but the ASA ruled that the advertisements' claims were unsupported by the studies and were misleading.

== Acquisition ==
In May 2008 the DDAT company (Dyslexia Dyspraxia Attention Treatment) went into liquidation, leading to the closure of its centres in Australia and in the UK. On 23 January 2009, Dynevor Ltd acquired the intellectual property rights and the assets of the Dore Programme from Wynford Dore and CDT Ltd.

== See also ==
- Arrowsmith Programme
