= Smartmovie =

Operating System

SmartMovie
- Original author: Lonely Cat Games

SmartMovie is a popular Symbian OS, Palm OS and Windows Mobile multimedia application.

== Features ==
- It allows the user to watch small clips to full-length high-quality movies on any phone using the cited operating systems.
- It supports multiple formats (.avi, .mp4, .3gp, etc.) and is the first mobile player to support subtitles.
- The player uses the phone screen in portrait or landscape mode, utilizing full screen size of the device.

== Converter ==
The application comes with a counterpart PC converter which enables the user to convert and resize the required video file to the appropriate mobile screen size. The converter supports DirectShow codecs, so the user may use the video codecs downloaded from the internet.

== Developer ==
SmartMovie is developed by Lonely Cat Games, a company with experience in Symbian and Windows OS applications and games.

== Piracy ==
The cracked application is easily available on public forums, p2p networks and other illegal networks. The application has also been modified into variations like 'Vista', 'Windows Media Player', 'Nvidia', etc. and they are quite popular among the members, with each one having thousands of downloads. The company on December 15, 2008 released the version 4.00 which requires internet verification to circumvent this problem.

== Community ==
For a video sharing community built around this application see the links below.
