= David Wolman =

American journalist

- Education: Stanford University
- Occupations: Author, Journalist
- Website: Official Website

David Wolman is an American author and journalist. He is a contributing editor at Outside, and has also written for publications such as Wired, The New York Times, The Wall Street Journal, Nature, National Geographic Traveler and BusinessWeek.

== Books ==
In November 2005, Da Capo Press published his first book, A Left-Hand Turn Around the World: Chasing the Mystery and Meaning of All Things Southpaw. His second book, Righting the Mother Tongue: From Olde English to Email, the Tangled Story of English Spelling, was published by Collins in October, 2008.

In 2008, Wolman went to Egypt to research an article for Wired about a small group of activists who were using Facebook to organize against the regime. Two years later, some of those activists, including Ahmed Maher, a founder of the April 6 Youth Movement were key figures in the revolution that ultimately overthrew President Hosni Mubarak. Wolman’s novella-length e-book, "The Instigators," tells their story.

The End of Money, published by Da Capo Press in 2012, takes a critical look at cash, from Marco Polo’s fascination with the paper notes he saw circulating in China, to the end of the gold standard. Wolman also explores a growing trend of people using cell phones as replacements for both bank branches and cash, and delves into the parallel worlds of counterfeiting and anti-counterfeiting technology.

Wolman has also published a digital collection of works in Firsthand: A Decade of Reportage. His latest book, Aloha Rodeo, the story of three Hawaiian cowboys, was published by William Morrow in May 2019.

== Background ==
Wolman studied geography and environmental studies at Middlebury College in Vermont. During his time at Middlebury, he completed a semester abroad in Samoa with SIT Study Abroad, a division of the School for International Training based in Brattleboro, Vermont. He later received his Master of Arts degree in journalism from Stanford University and completed a Fulbright journalism grant in Sapporo, Japan. Currently residing in Portland, Oregon, Wolman travels frequently to research topics in science, technology and business.

== Awards ==
- Fulbright Journalism Fellow, Sapporo, Japan, 2003
- Oregon Arts Commission, Individual Artist Fellowship, 2011
- Society of Environmental Journalists, third place, Outstanding In-depth Reporting, Small Market, 2011
- National Magazine Awards, finalist, Digital Media Reporting, 2012
- American Society of Journalists and Authors, Outstanding Article (Profiles), 2013
