= Macquarie University Faculty of Human Sciences =

Faculty of Human Sciences
- Type: Public
- Active: 1964–2019
- Location: Sydney, New South Wales, Australia
- Campus: Urban
- Affiliations: Macquarie University

The Macquarie University Faculty of Human Sciences was a prominent academic division of Macquarie University in Sydney, Australia, established in 2009 to integrate disciplines focused on the social and biological foundations of human behavior. The faculty comprised four major departments: Cognitive Science, Educational Studies, Linguistics, and Psychology. It gained international recognition as a research powerhouse, housing several world-class entities such as the Macquarie Centre for Cognitive Science (MACCS), the Macquarie University Special Education Centre (MUSEC), and the ARC Centre of Excellence in Cognition and its Disorders. Throughout its ten-year history, the faculty was credited with significant contributions to the field of hearing science—collaborating with the Australian Hearing Hub— and the development of the Macquarie Dictionary, the authoritative reference for Australian English.

In late 2019, Macquarie University announced the "disestablishment" of the faculty as part of a strategic organizational restructure aimed at consolidating related research fields and improving operational efficiency. The change, which officially took effect in 2020, saw the Department of Educational Studies transition into the Faculty of Arts, while the departments of Cognitive Science, Linguistics, and Psychology were merged with the existing Faculty of Medicine and Health Sciences. This merger resulted in the formation of the expanded Faculty of Medicine, Health and Human Sciences. Despite the dissolution of the standalone faculty, its legacy continues through its highly ranked clinical programs and its specialized labs, which remain central to the university's multidisciplinary approach to neuroscience and human interaction.

== Faculty departments and centres ==
The Faculty of Human Sciences comprised four departments and several centres:

Departments formerly in the faculty

- Department of Cognitive Science
- Department of Educational Studies
- Department of Linguistics
- Department of Psychology

Centres previously hosted by the faculty

- Adult Migrant English Program Research Centre
- Macquarie Centre for Cognitive Science
- Macquarie E-Learning Centre of Excellence
- Macquarie University Special Education Centre
- Macquarie Centre for Reading
- ARC Centre of Excellence for Cognition and its Disorders

The Faculty of Human Sciences was disestablished in 2019. The Department of Educational Studies was moved to the Faculty of Arts, while the remaining three Departments (Cognitive Science, Linguistics, and Psychology) were moved to the Faculty of Medicine and Health Sciences which was renamed the Faculty of Medicine, Health and Human Sciences.
