= Brain Gym International =

Brain training and body movement programme

- Founded: 1987
- Founders: Paul E. Dennison and Gail E. Dennison
- Type: Nonprofit 501(c)3 in Education
- Location: Ventura, California, US
- Region served: Worldwide
- Product: Methods purported to aid learning
- Website: Brain Gym International

Brain Gym is a proprietary brain training and body movement programme. It is widely considered to be pseudoscience.

== Organization ==
"Brain Gym International" is the trade name of the Educational Kinesiology Foundation, a California nonprofit corporation that was incorporated in 1987 and that received its IRS ruling as a nonprofit in 1992. "Brain Gym" is a registered trademark owned by the company.

== Business ==
In the 1970s, Paul and Gail Dennison developed a set of physical exercises claimed to improve children's ability to learn and to be based in neuroscience; they called their approach "educational kinesthesiology". The company makes money training people in the methods, and licenses the right to use the "Brain Gym" trademark to people whom it trains; the trained people use branded books and other materials they buy from the company. Schools pay the trained people to work in schools, training teachers and working with students.

In 2005 the company claimed to be selling its programs in 80 countries and by 2007 it had been widely covered in the press. In a 2013 article in The Economist commenting on the wave of "brain training" programs being brought to market at that time, the organization was used as an example of commercializing neuroscience in a way that scientists found unsupportable but that received widespread adoption for a time. The program was adopted widely in schools in the UK and appeared on many UK government websites as of 2006, although in 2018 Ofsted, the UK schools inspectorate, singled out Brain Gym as a "gimmick" and warned schools against using it.

== Methods ==
The Brain Gym program calls for children to repeat certain simple movements such as crawling, yawning, making symbols in the air, and drinking water; these are intended to "integrate", "repattern", and increase blood flow to the brain.

Though the organization claims the methods are grounded in good neuroscience, the underlying ideas are pseudoscience.

One of the underlying ideas is that the exercises are intended to balance the brain hemispheres so the two sides work together better; there is also a notion of integrating the "top" parts of the brain with the "lower" parts of the brain to integrate thought and emotion, as well as integrating visual, auditory, and motor skills. Another idea is that of "brain buttons" - spots on the neck that if touched in certain ways, are purported to stimulate the flow of blood to the brain. There is no good quality evidence to suggest that any of these exercises are effective.

Another set of underlying ideas is psychomotor patterning, also known as the Doman-Delacato theory of development, which claims that if motor skills are not acquired in the correct order, the result will be a lifelong deficit in learning ability, and also claims that these deficits can be overcome by going back and learning the skipped skills; this theory, and claims to improve learning based on it, were discredited in the 1970s and 1980s. An example of this in the Brain Gym method is to have children practice crawling.

== Scientific research ==
The claims associated with this organization have underlying pseudoscientific ideas. Moreover, a number of peer-reviewed research studies have not found any significant evidence that supports the ideas put forth by the promoters of Brain Gym. There is no evidence using strict scientific method that brain gym exercises have any benefit. While Brain Gym International claims that this program claims to improve learning, studies have not found any clear evidence for this. Many of their claims are based on anecdotal evidence instead of providing empirical evidence. For instance, yawning was included in the program’s regime due to an individual believing that yawning on purpose helped their vision. They were, however, unable to provide any research supporting this claim.

Moreover, the theoretical foundations that were used to develop Brain Gym have actually been rejected by research findings. The few empirical studies that do exist which seem to support Brain Gym have methodological issues and concerns such as a no control groups, lack of pre-test data and an apparent lack of direct measures for behaviours of concern. Additionally, the empirical research that has been conducted has tended to not be consistent as it has measured different outcome variables. An article in the International Journal of Education advised that caution should be employed when educators are determining the efficacy of such programs for improving students' academic performance, and that educators should be sceptical when deciding if this is the right program to implement into a school setting if they are hoping for substantial improvements in students academic outcomes.

== See also ==
- Applied kinesiology
- Brain training
- Conductive education
- Experiential learning
- Fast ForWord
- Kinesthetic learning
- LearningRx
- Alternative Therapies for developmental and learning disabilities
- Sensorimotor learning
- Smart Moves: Why Learning Is Not All In Your Head
