= The Brain that Changes Itself =

2007 book by Norman Doidge

The Brain That Changes Itself
- First edition cover
- Author: Norman Doidge
- Language: English
- Subject: Neuroplasticity
- Genre: Non-fiction
- Publisher: Viking Press
- Publication date: 2007
- Publication place: United States
- Media type: Print, e-book
- Pages: 427 pp.
- ISBN: 9781101147115
- OCLC: 71189897
- Dewey Decimal: 612.8 22
- LC Class: QP363.3 .D65 2007

The Brain That Changes Itself: Stories of Personal Triumph from the Frontiers of Brain Science is a book on neuroplasticity by psychiatrist and psychoanalyst Norman Doidge.

== Content ==
The book is a collection of stories of doctors and patients showing that the human brain is capable of undergoing change, including stories of recovering use of paralyzed body parts, deaf people learning to hear, and others getting relief from pain using exercises to retrain neural pathways. Doidge also covers scientists who first identified neuroplasticity, the subjects of persistent pain, sexual attraction and love, how culture impacts the changing brain, the developing pediatric brain and the preservation of the geriatric brain.

The book contains 11 chapters:

1. A Woman Perpetually Falling, Rescued by the Man Who Discovered the Plasticity of Our Senses
2. Building Herself, a Better Brain A Woman Labeled "Retarded" Discovers How to Heal Herself
3. Redesigning the Brain, A Scientist Changes Brains to Sharpen Perception and Memory, Increase Speed of Thought, and Heal Learning Problems
4. Acquiring Tastes and Loves What Neuroplasticity Teaches Us About Sexual Attraction and Love
5. Midnight Resurrections, Stroke Victims Learn to Move and Speak Again
6. Brain Lock Unlocked, Using Plasticity to Stop Worries, Obsessions, Compulsions, and Bad Habits
7. Pain The Dark Side of Plasticity
8. Imagination, How Thinking Makes It So
9. Turning Our Ghosts into Ancestors, Psychoanalysis as a Neuroplastic Therapy
10. Rejuvenation, The Discovery of the Neuronal Stem Cell and Lessons for Preserving Our Brains
11. More than the Sum of Her Parts, A Woman Shows Us How Radically Plastic the Brain Can Be

== Reception ==
The New York Times gave a mostly positive review of the book.

Dr. Doidge, a Canadian psychiatrist and award-winning science writer, recounts the accomplishments of the "neuroplasticians," as he calls the neuroscientists involved in these new studies, with breathless reverence. Their work is indeed mind-bending, miracle-making, reality-busting stuff, with implications, as Dr. Doidge notes, not only for individual patients with neurologic disease but for all human beings, not to mention human culture, human learning and human history.

— New York Times

In contrast The International Journal of Psychoanalysis published a negative book review essay critical of Doidge's writings. The review claims that neuroscience is irrelevant to the study of psychoanalysis. (Note: Doidge's other book The Brains Way of Healing was also reviewed negatively by clinical psychologist Robert Shepard in his article Would You Trust This Man? Norman Doidge and the Brain’s Way of… Fooling You)

Kirkus Reviews stated the book is "somewhat scattershot, but Doidge's personal stories, enthusiasm for his subject and admiration for its researchers keep the reader engaged."

In a review of the book for the Society for Psychoanalysis and Psychoanalytic Psychology, Jane Hall wrote in 2011 "Contrary to the original belief that after childhood the brain begins a long process of decline, [Doidge] shows us that our brains have the remarkable power to grow, change, overcome disabilities, learn, recover, and alter the very culture that has the potential to deeply affect human nature."

The book is rich in both journalism and science. Not only does the author have professional credentials deriving from his training as a psychiatrist and analyst, but he also has extensive experience in writing, including a three-year stint writing the column 'On Human Nature' for the Canadian newspaper The National Post. [...] More than anything else, it is Doidge's standing as a professional observer of human behavior that ultimately captivates the reader.

— Peter Reiner in American Journal of Bioethics

== See also ==
- Barbara Arrowsmith Young, the subject of Chapter 2 of the book.
- Brain training
