= Norman Doidge =

Canadian psychiatrist, psychoanalyst, and author

Norman Doidge FRCPC
- Born: Toronto, Ontario
- Citizenship: Canada
- Education: University of Toronto; Columbia University
- Occupations: Psychiatrist, Psychoanalyst, Author
- Website: normandoidge.com

Norman Doidge is a Canadian psychiatrist, psychoanalyst, and author of The Brain that Changes Itself and The Brain's Way of Healing.

== Education ==
Doidge studied literary classics and philosophy at the University of Toronto and graduated "with high distinction". After winning the E. J. Pratt Prize for Poetry at age 19, Doidge was given early recognition by literary critic Northrop Frye, who wrote that his work was "really remarkable... haunting and memorable." He obtained his medical degree at the University of Toronto, then moved to New York, where he had a residency in psychiatry and obtained a degree in psychoanalysis at Columbia University Department of Psychiatry, and the Columbia University Center for Psychoanalytic Training and Research. This was followed by a two-year Columbia University/National Institute of Mental Health Research Fellowship, training in empirical science techniques.

== Career ==
Returning to his native Toronto, Doidge served as Head of the Psychotherapy Centre and the Assessment Clinic at the Clarke Institute of Psychiatry (now part of CAMH). He was Faculty at the University of Toronto's Department of Psychiatry and Research Faculty at the Columbia University Center for Psychoanalytic Training and Research, Columbia University, New York for 30 years. He is a training and supervising analyst at the Toronto Institute of Psychoanalysis.

In the 1990s, Doidge authored empirically based standards and guidelines for the practice of intensive psychotherapy that have been used in Canada and America. These were published in the "Standards and Guidelines for the Psychotherapies" edited by Cameron, Deadman and Ennis.

In 2008, he was awarded the Mary S. Sigourney Prize for his scientific writing on neuroplasticity and research in psychoanalysis.

More recently, Doidge published an important and critical article discussing and examining the impact the COVID-19 narrative has had on scientific development of COVID treatments and management in addition to policy.

== Writing ==
Doidge has written over 170 articles, a combination of academic, scientific and popular pieces. He has been sole author of academic papers on neuroplasticity, human limitations and notions of perfectibility, psychotherapy treatment outcomes, dreams about animals, Schizoid personality disorder and trauma, psychoanalysis, and neuroscience, such as a popular article he wrote in 2006 for Maclean's magazine in which he argues, using empirical studies, that understanding unconscious thought is important in modern-day psychiatry and psychology.

Doidge was editor of Books in Canada: The Canadian Review of Books from 1995 to 1998, and editor at large for several years after that. His series of literary portraits of exceptional people at moments of transformation appeared in Saturday Night Magazine; he won four National Magazine Awards, including the President's medal for his Saturday Night interview with Saul Bellow (Love, Friendship and the Art of Dying) in 2000.

Doidge's first book, The Brain that Changes Itself (2007), was an international bestseller and is widely recognized to have introduced the concept of neuroplasticity to broader scientific and lay audiences alike. It showed people with learning disorders, blindness, balance and sensory disorders, strokes, cerebral palsy, chronic pain, chronic depression and anxiety, and obsessive compulsive disorder being helped by neuroplastic interventions.

The book was acclaimed by many well-known scholars and researchers in the brain sciences, including neuroscientist V. S. Ramachandran and neurologist Oliver Sacks. The prominent psychiatrist Iain McGilchrist praised it as “An utterly wonderful book—without question one of the most important books about the brain you will ever read.” Writing in the journal Neuropsychoanalysis, psychology professor Eric Fertuck wrote, “Doidge… has written a book that accurately conveys cutting-edge scientific discoveries while simultaneously engaging both scientific and popular audiences." Jeanette Winterson (CBE) chose it as one of her books of the year in 2008, calling it “Brilliant…This book is a wonderful and engaging way or re-imagining what kind of creatures we are.”

In 2010, the Dana Foundation's journal Cerebrum chose The Brain That Changes Itself as “the best general book on the brain". In 2016, the Literary Review of Canada ranked it among the 25 most influential books published in Canada since 1991.

Doidge's second book, The Brain's Way of Healing (2015), describes an expanding number of clinical conditions that may be treated by neuroplastic interventions. It was a New York Times bestseller and also received praise from both lay and specialized readership, with Ramachandran stating that it is “a treasure trove of the author's own deep insights and a clear bright light of optimism shines through every page.” The psychiatrist Stephen Porges wrote that it was “paradigm challenging. The Brain's Way of Healing is brilliantly organized, scientifically documented, and a beautifully written narrative that captivates the reader, who is left with the profound message that the brain, similar to other organs, can heal." This book received the 2015 Gold Nautilus Book Award in the Science category.

In 2018, Doidge wrote the foreword to Jordan Peterson's 12 Rules for Life: An Antidote to Chaos.

=== Criticism ===
Developmental psychologist Diana Divecha (of Yale University) criticizes Doidge and The Brain's Way of Healing for promoting unsupported ideas about neuroplasticity and for promoting discredited auditory treatments for autism. She says that "Doidge relies mainly upon near-miraculous anecdotes of recovery to support his claims", and that he cites outdated psychoanalysts. She argues that Doidge's mechanisms of change in his book are "vague" and do not meet scientific standards, writing: "Most of the treatments he describes rely on the brain's capacity to rewire and reorganize, activating 'dormant' areas here, quieting 'noise' there, building new connections through repeated micro-practices, sometimes in combination with traditional rehab. That terminology is too nonspecific to convince me." (Note: The Brains Way of Healing was also reviewed negatively by clinical psychologist Robert Shepard in his article Would You Trust This Man? Norman Doidge and the Brain’s Way of… Fooling You)

== Film and television ==
Doidge has appeared in numerous interviews on television programs in several countries. In 2008, Doidge co-wrote an award-winning documentary based on The Brain That Changes Itself for the Canadian Broadcasting Corporation in which he presents case studies and examples of neuroplasticity described in the book. In 2010, he participated in a follow-up documentary, "Changing Your Mind", aired on CBC's The Nature of Things. Both films were directed by Mike Sheerin and produced by 90th Parallel Productions, with ARTE co-producing and distributing them in Europe. The Brain's Way of Healing was also made into a documentary. In addition, he has appeared in several documentaries including Seeking Happiness in Germany (2011), Beeban Kidron's InRealLife (2013) in the UK, and the Irish documentary Meetings with Ivor (2017).

=== Books ===
- Doidge, Norman (2007). The Brain that Changes Itself: Stories of Personal Triumph from the Frontiers of Brain Science. Penguin. ISBN 9780143113102. OL 9444179M.
- Doidge, Norman (2015). The Brain's Way of Healing: Remarkable Discoveries and Recoveries from the Frontiers of Neuroplasticity. Penguin. ISBN 9780670025503.
