= Biblical archaeology school =

School of archaeology which concerns itself with the biblical world

Biblical archaeology, is the school of archaeology which concerns itself with the biblical world. In the academic setting it serves as an adjunct to biblical studies, providing the historical, cultural, and linguistic context to scripture.

If the modern discipline had a founder, it would be William F. Albright, an American with roots in the Evangelical tradition. By the 1950s, Albright and his students, notably Nelson Glueck, E. A. Speiser, G. Ernest Wright, and Cyrus Gordon, claimed to have found physical evidence for the historical events behind many Old Testament narratives.

== 18th to early 20th century ==
Adriaan Reland, professor of philosophy at the University of Harderwijk, was one of the early Orientalists, teaching Hebrew antiquities from 1713. Although he never ventured beyond the borders of the Netherlands, he was also acclaimed as a cartographer and published the first modern work of biblical archaeology, Palaestina ex monumentis veteribus illustrata, a detailed geographical survey of Palestine in 1696 written in Latin and published by Willem Broedelet, Utrecht, in 1714.

The foundations of biblical archaeology were laid in the 19th century with the work of antiquarians such as Johann Jahn, whose manual of biblical antiquities, Biblische Archäologie, (1802, translated into English 1839) was immensely influential in the middle years of the 19th century. Shortly thereafter, Edward Robinson, known as the founder of modern Palestinology published the bestselling Biblical Researches in Palestine, the Sinai, Petrae and Adjacent Regions (1841), which prompted a group of English clergymen and scholars to found the Palestine Exploration Fund "to promote research into the archaeology and history, manners and customs and culture, topography, geology and natural sciences of biblical Palestine and the Levant" in 1865. This was followed by the Deutscher Palästina-Verein (1877) and the École Biblique (1890). The American School of Oriental Research was founded in 1900, and the British School of Archaeology in 1919. The research these institutions sponsored, at least in these early days, was primarily geographic, and it was not until the 1890s that Sir Flinders Petrie introduced the basic principles of scientific excavation, including stratigraphy and ceramic typology to Palestinian archaeology.

== William F. Albright and the biblical archaeology school ==
The dominant figure in 20th-century biblical archaeology, defining its scope and shaping the mid-century consensus on the relationship between archaeology, the Bible, and the history of ancient Israel, was William F. Albright (1891–1971). An American with roots in the American Evangelical tradition (his parents served as Methodist missionaries in Chile), Director of the American Schools of Oriental Research (ASOR), (now the W. F. Albright Institute of Archaeological Research) through the 1920s and 1930s, editor of ASOR's Bulletin until 1968, and author of over a thousand books and articles, Albright drew biblical archaeology into the contemporary debates over the origins and reliability of the Bible. In the early decades of the 20th century much debate centered on the documentary hypothesis. This explained the Old Testament as the composite product of authors working between the 10th and 5th centuries BC, and raised the question of whether one could regard the books of the bible as a reliable source of information for Solomon's period or earlier." European scholars such as Hermann Gunkel (1862–1932), Albrecht Alt (1883–1956) and Martin Noth (1902–1968) suggested that the books of the Old Testament rested on a body of oral tradition that reflected historical events, but could not themselves be regarded as historically accurate. Albright saw archaeology as a practical means to test these ideas. Biblical archaeology, for him, therefore embraced all lands and any finds that could "throw some light, directly or indirectly, on the Bible".

Albright and his followers believed that archaeology could and should be used to shed light on the biblical narrative, particularly the Old Testament. The influential academic positions held by Albright and his followers, and their immense output—Albright alone authored over a thousand books and articles—made their work highly influential, especially in America, and especially among ordinary Christians who wished to believe that archaeology had "proved the Bible true". In fact the members of the school were not biblical literalists, and their main concern was to discriminate between those parts of the biblical story that were true and those that were embellishments.

By the middle of the 20th century, the work of Albright and his students, notably Nelson Glueck (1900–1971), E. A. Speiser (1902–1965), G. Ernest Wright (1909–1974) and Cyrus Gordon (1908–2001), had produced a consensus that biblical archaeology had provided physical evidence for the originating historical events behind the Old Testament narratives: in the words of Albright: "Discovery after discovery has established the accuracy of innumerable details of the Bible as a source of history." The consensus allowed the writing of authoritative textbooks such as John Bright's History of Israel (1959). Bright did not believe that the stories of Abraham, Isaac, Jacob and Joseph could be regarded as reliable history, or that it was possible to reconstruct the origins of Israel from the biblical text alone, but he did believe that the stories in Genesis reflected the physical reality of the 20th to 17th centuries BC, and that it was therefore possible to write a history of the origins of Israel by comparing the biblical accounts with what was known of the time from other sources.

== Biblical archaeology today ==
Albrightian theories were largely overturned in the second half of the 20th century, especially in regards to suppositions that Albrightians made regarding the pre-monarchic era. Improved archaeological methods, notably Kathleen Kenyon's excavations at Jericho, did not support the conclusions the biblical archaeologists had drawn, with the result that central theories squaring the biblical narrative with archaeological finds, such as Albright's reconstruction of Abraham as an Amorite donkey caravaneer, were rejected by the archaeological community. The challenge reached its climax with the publication of two important studies: In 1974 Thomas L. Thompson's The Historicity of the Patriarchal Narratives re-examined the record of biblical archaeology in relation to the Patriarchal narratives in Genesis and concluded that "not only has archaeology not proven a single event of the Patriarchal narratives to be historical, it has not shown any of the traditions to be likely." and in 1975 John Van Seters' Abraham in History and Tradition reached a similar conclusion about the usefulness of tradition history: "A vague presupposition about the antiquity of the tradition based upon a consensus approval of such arguments should no longer be used as a warrant for proposing a history of the tradition related to early premonarchic times."

At the same time a new generation of archaeologists, notably William G. Dever, criticized biblical archaeology for failing to take note of the revolution in archaeology known as processualism, which saw the discipline as a scientific one allied to anthropology, rather than as a part of the corpus of the humanities linked to history and theology. Biblical archaeology, Dever said, remained "altogether too narrowly within a theological angle of vision," and should be abandoned and replaced with a regional Syro-Palestinian archaeology operating within a processual framework.

Dever was broadly successful: most archaeologists working in the world of the Bible today do so within a processual or post-processual framework: yet few describe themselves in these terms. The reasons for this attachment to the old nomenclature are complex, but are connected with the link between excavators (especially American ones) and the denominational institutions and benefactors who employ and support them, and with the unwillingness of biblical scholars, both conservative and liberal, to reject the link between the Bible and archaeology. The result has been a blurring of the distinction between the theologically based archaeology that interprets the archaeological record as "substantiating in general the theological message of a God who acts in history," and Dever's vision of Syro-Palestinian archaeology as an "independent, secular discipline ... pursued by cultural historians for its own sake."

Evangelical scholar Kenneth Kitchen, despite supporting the historicity of the Bible, has also been critical of biblical archaeology as it was conceived in the first half of the 20th century. In his book On the Reliability of the Old Testament, he dismisses Albright and Gordon as "little local (and very parochial)" representatives of the "long-deceased American Biblical Archaeology/theology school". However, he is also critical of new trends that have emerged from the demise of Albright and Bright's school:

There seems to be a psychological hangover here; in the 1950s and 1960s, Albright and Dever's much-hated "American Biblical Archaeology" (plus theology) movement had believed in the patriarchs and exodus, so (irrationally) nobody now (two generations later) must either be allowed to study them seriously and produced any data (no matter how genuine or germane) that do suggest their possible reality.

== See also ==
- Biblical maximalism
- Biblical minimalism
- Levantine archaeology
- Schweich Lectures on Biblical Archaeology
