= Thomas L. Thompson =

Biblical scholar and theologian

Thomas L. Thompson (born January 7, 1939, in Detroit, Michigan) is an American-born Danish biblical scholar and theologian. He was professor of theology at the University of Copenhagen from 1993 to 2009. He currently lives in Denmark.

Thompson is a part of the minimalist movement known as the Copenhagen School, a group of scholars who hold that the Bible cannot be used as a source to determine the history of ancient Israel, and that "Israel" itself is a problematic concept.

== Biography ==
Thompson was raised as a Catholic and obtained a Bachelor of Arts from Duquesne University, in Pittsburgh, Pennsylvania, United States, in 1962. After a year in Oxford, he moved to Tübingen, where he studied for 12 years with Kurt Galling and Herbert Haag. In the meantime, he was an instructor in theology at Dayton University (1964–65) and assistant professor in Old Testament studies at the University of Detroit (1967–69). He then studied Catholic theology at the University of Tübingen; his dissertation, "The Historicity of the Patriarchal Narratives: The Quest for the Historical Abraham", was completed in 1971, but rejected by the Catholic faculty (one of his examiners was Joseph Ratzinger, then Tübingen's Professor of Systematic Theology and later Pope Benedict XVI). Thompson then considered submitting his dissertation to the Protestant faculty, but left Tübingen in 1975 without a degree. The rejected dissertation was published in 1974 by De Gruyter Press. The work, together with John Van Seters' Abraham in History and Tradition, became one of the pioneer works of biblical minimalism.

While teaching part-time at the University of North Carolina at Chapel Hill, he was invited to finish his studies at Temple University in Philadelphia, Pennsylvania, receiving his Ph.D. in Old Testament studies summa cum laude in 1976.

The controversy around his dissertation prevented him from obtaining a position at a North American university. He continued as a private scholar while working as a high-school teacher, janitor, and house painter until he was awarded a guest professorship at the École Biblique in Jerusalem in 1984. This appointment proved controversial among Israelis, who, according to Thompson, objected to his earlier study casting doubt on the historicity of the Jewish origin narratives. He then worked on a project on Palestinian place names for UNESCO, criticizing Israeli authorities for de-Arabicizing Palestinian place names. Accusations of antisemitism led to the project being closed.

Thompson was named a National Endowment for the Humanities fellow in 1988. He taught as visiting associate professor at Lawrence University (1988–89) and as associate professor at Marquette University (1989–1993), but did not receive tenure. In 1990, he met Danish theologian Niels Peter Lemche at a conference, and in 1993, joined the faculty of the department of theology at the University of Copenhagen as professor in Old Testament exegesis. He retired and was granted emeritus status in 2009.

Thompson is general editor for the series Copenhagen International Seminar, associate editor of the Scandinavian Journal of the Old Testament, and serves on the editorial boards of the journals Holy Land Studies and Dansk Teologisk Tidsskrift.

== Old Testament writings ==
The focus of Thompson's writing has been the interface between the Bible (specifically the Old Testament) and archaeology. His The Historicity of the Patriarchal Narratives (1974) was a critique of the then-dominant view that biblical archaeology had demonstrated the historicity of figures such as Abraham and other Biblical patriarchs. His The Early History of the Israelite People From the Written and Archaeological Sources (1993) set out his argument that the biblical history was not reliable, and concludes: "The linguistic and literary reality of the biblical tradition is folkloristic in essence. The concept of a benei Israel ... is a reflection of no sociopolitical entity of the historical state of Israel of the Assyrian period...." In The Bible in History: How Writers Create a Past (U.S. title: The Mythic Past: Biblical Archaeology and the Myth of Israel), he argued that the Old Testament was entirely, or almost entirely, a product of the period between the fifth and second centuries BC.

Thompson's arguments were criticized by many biblical scholars, prominent among them William G. Dever in his book What Did the Biblical Writers Know and When Did They Know It?, which has been described as "a very polemic and partly vehement attack not least against Professor Thomas L. Thompson". Thompson himself reviewed Dever's book and provided his own responses to Dever's critiques. The fact that Thompson, as a target of many of the critiques advanced in the book would have chosen to review it, was criticized by H. Hagelia.

== New Testament writings ==
Thompson presented a criticism of the historicity of the New Testament in his 2005 book, The Messiah Myth: The Near Eastern Roots of Jesus and David, He argues that the biblical accounts of both King David and Jesus of Nazareth are mythical in nature and based on Mesopotamian, Egyptian, Babylonian, and Greek and Roman literature. For example, he argues that the resurrection of Jesus is taken directly from the myths about Dionysus, which he described as a "dying and rising god". Thompson did not draw a final conclusion on the historicity or ahistoricity of Jesus. He was a fellow of the short-lived Jesus Project from 2008 to 2009.

The Messiah Myth was criticized by New Testament scholars such as Bart Ehrman, who in 2012 published a criticism of Jesus ahistoricity theory proponents, Did Jesus Exist? The Historical Argument for Jesus of Nazareth, in which he stated that "A different sort of support for a mythicist position comes in the work of Thomas L. Thompson," and critiqued Thompson's arguments and criticized Thompson, as an Old Testament scholar, for lacking the sufficient background in New Testament studies to provide a useful analysis of the text. In 2012, Thompson responded with the online article, Is This Not the Carpenter’s Son? A Response to Bart Ehrman, in which he rejects Ehrman's characterization of his views, stating that Erhman "has attributed to my book arguments and principles which I had never presented, certainly not that Jesus had never existed." Ehrman's views were defended by New Testament scholar Maurice Casey, who dismissed Thompson as "an incompetent scholar".

Thompson and Thomas Verenna coedited the 2012 book Is This Not the Carpenter?: The Question of the Historicity of the Figure of Jesus. The introduction defined the purpose of the collected essays: "Neither establishing the historicity of an historical Jesus nor possessing an adequate warrant for dismissing it, our purpose is to clarify our engagement with critical historical and exegetical methods." Thompson's views about the New Testament are rejected by mainstream scholarship.

== Criticism ==
Thompson's minimalist positions have generated a considerable controversy in the academic field and have been criticised by a number of scholars. Archaeologist and Old Testament scholar William G. Dever has repeatedly criticised Thompson's views in his works, even devoting an entire book in challenging them (What Did the Biblical Writers Know and When Did They Know It?), in which he defended the historical value of the Bible from the Book of Judges and onwards: according to Dever, Thompson's theorems are dangerous, because it tends to eliminate altogether any study of ancient Israel prior to the Persian period.

Even harsher criticism has come from evangelical scholars, such as Kenneth Kitchen (University of Liverpool), whose book On the Reliability of the Old Testament consistently defends the historicity of the Tanakh. Taking a different approach, A Biblical History of Israel, by Iain Provan, V. Philips Long, and Tremper Longman III (Regent College), argued that criterion of distrust set by the minimalists (the Bible should be regarded as unreliable unless directly confirmed by external sources) was unreasonable, and that it should be regarded as reliable unless directly falsified. Avi Hurvitz (Hebrew University of Jerusalem) compared biblical Hebrew with the Hebrew from ancient inscriptions and found it consistent with the period before the Persian period, thus questioning the key minimalist contention that the biblical books were written several centuries after the events they describe. Takamitsu Muraoka (Leiden University) also argues against the hypothesis that the entire Hebrew Bible was composed in the Persian period, associated with some minimalists like Davies, countering that there are specifically late Biblical Hebrew features, like some rare plene spellings, that are contained in books dated to the Persian era by minimalists as well, but unusual or absent elsewhere.

Italian scholar Mario Liverani (Sapienza University of Rome) has also been critical of Thompson's views: in his book Israel's History and the History of Israel, Liverani accepts that the biblical sources are from the Persian period, but believes that the minimalists have not truly understood that context nor recognised the importance of the ancient sources used by the authors.

Thompson's works on the New Testament have been met with even stronger criticism: in his book Did Jesus Exist?, Bart D. Ehrman (University of North Carolina at Chapel Hill) critiqued Thompson's arguments and criticized Thompson, as an Old Testament scholar, for lacking the sufficient background in New Testament studies to provide a useful analysis of the text. Similar criticism came from Maurice Casey (University of Nottingham), who went even so far as to call Thompson "an incompetent" in the field of New Testament studies. Dever dismissed Thompson's views about Jesus as "an ongoing campaign that isn't mainstream anywhere in biblical studies".

== Books ==
- Thompson, Thomas L. (1974). Beihefte zur Zeitschrift für die alttestamentliche Wissenschaft. Walter de Gruyter. ISBN 9783110040968.
- Thompson, Thomas L. (2002). The Historicity of the Patriarchal Narratives: The Quest for the Historical Abraham. Continuum International Publishing Group. ISBN 978-1-56338-389-2. (Originally de Gruyter: Berlin, 1974)
- Thompson, Thomas L.; Maniragaba Balibutsa; Margaret M. Clarkson (1975). The Settlement of Sinai and the Negev in the Bronze Age. Reichert. ISBN 978-3-920153-44-5.
- Thompson, Thomas L. (1979). The settlement of Palestine in the Bronze Age. Reichert. ISBN 978-3-88226-069-4.
- Thompson, Thomas L. (1987). The Origin Tradition of Ancient Israel. JSOT Press. ISBN 978-1-85075-083-3.
- Thompson, Thomas L.; Francolino J. Gonçalves; Jean-Marie van Cangh (1988). Toponymie palestinienne: plaine de St Jean d'Acre et corridor de Jérusalem. Université catholique de Louvain, Institut orientaliste.
- Thompson, Thomas L. (1992). Early History of the Israelite People: From the Written and Archeological Sources. BRILL. ISBN 978-90-04-09483-3.
- Hyldahl, Niels; Thomas L. Thompson (1996). Dødehavsteksterne og Bibelen. Museum Tusculanum Press. ISBN 978-87-7289-390-7.
- Cryser, Frederick H.; Thomas L. Thompson, eds. (1998). Qumran Between the Old and New Testament. Continuum International Publishing Group. ISBN 978-0-567-18135-0.
- Thompson, Thomas L. (1999). The Bible in History: How Writers Create a Past. Cape. ISBN 978-0-224-03977-2.
- Thompson, Thomas L. (1999). The Mythic Past: Biblical Archaeology And The Myth Of Israel. Basic Books. ISBN 978-0-465-01052-3.
- Thompson, Thomas L., ed. (2003). Jerusalem in ancient history and tradition. T & T Clark International. ISBN 978-0-8264-6664-8.
- (With Z. Mouna et alii), What is New in Biblical Archaeology (in Arabic: Cadmus: Damascus, 2004)
- Tronier, Henrik; Thomas L. Thompson, eds. (2004). Frelsens biografisering. Museum Tusculanum Press. ISBN 978-87-635-0214-6.
- Mogens, Müller; Thomas L. Thompson, eds. (2005). Historie og konstruktion: festskrift til Nils Peter Lemche i anledning af 60 års fødselsdagen den 6. september 2005. Museum Tusculanum Press. ISBN 978-87-635-0377-8.
- Thompson, Thomas L. (2007). The Messiah Myth: The Near Eastern Roots of Jesus and David. Basic Books. ISBN 978-0-7867-3911-0.
- Thompson, Thomas L.; Thomas S. Verenna, eds. (2012). 'Is This Not the Carpenter?': The Question of the Historicity of the Figure of Jesus. Isd. ISBN 978-1-84553-986-3.
- Thompson, Thomas L. (2013). Biblical Narrative and Palestine's History: Changing Perspectives 2. Equinox Publishing Limited. ISBN 978-1-908049-95-7.
