= Patriarchal age =

Biblical era of Abraham, Isaac and Jacob

The patriarchal age is the era of the three biblical patriarchs, Abraham, Isaac and Jacob, according to the narratives of Genesis 12–50 (these chapters also contain the history of Joseph, although Joseph is not one of the patriarchs). It is preceded in the Bible by the primeval history and followed by The Exodus.

Most scholars agree that it is not possible to prove or disprove the historicity of the biblical patriarchs.

== Dating ==
The Bible contains an intricate pattern of chronologies from the creation of Adam, the first man, to the reigns of the later kings of ancient Israel and Judah. Based on this chronology and the Rabbinic tradition, ancient Jewish sources such as Seder Olam Rabbah date the birth of Abraham to 1948 AM (c. 1813 BCE) and place the death of Jacob in 2255 AM (c. 1506 BCE).

The Bible provides relative dates for the patriarchal period. 1 Kings 6:1 states that King Solomon built the Jerusalem Temple 480 years after the Exodus, and Exodus 12:40 states that the Hebrews lived in Egypt for 430 years. Using the limmu lists of Assyria, these relative dates can be converted into estimated absolute dates. Using this method, it appears that the Bible places the patriarchal age in the first half of the 2nd millennium BCE between 2100 and 1500 BCE. Abraham would have been born c. 2166 BCE, and Jacob and his family would have moved to Egypt c. 1876 BCE.

== Biblical archaeology ==
Following Albright's death, his interpretation of the Patriarchal age came under increasing criticism: such dissatisfaction marked its culmination with the publication of The Historicity of the Patriarchal Narratives by Thomas L. Thompson and Abraham in History and Tradition by John van Seters. Thompson, a literary scholar, argued on the lack of compelling evidence that the patriarchs lived in the 2nd millennium BCE, and noted how certain biblical texts reflected first millennium conditions and concerns, while Van Seters examined the patriarchal stories and argued that their names, social milieu, and messages strongly suggested that they were Iron Age creations. Van Seter and Thompson's works were a paradigm shift in biblical scholarship and archaeology, which gradually led scholars to no longer consider the patriarchal narratives as historical. Some conservative scholars attempted to defend the Patriarchal narratives in the following years,, such as according to John Bright "We can assert with full confidence that Abraham, Isaac and Jacob were actual historical individuals." These positions have not found acceptance among scholars.

In 2001, archaeologist William G. Dever wrote: "After a century of exhaustive investigation, all respectable archaeologists have given up hope of recovering any context that would make Abraham, Isaac, or Jacob 'historical figures.'"

== See also ==
- Nuzi texts
- Prehistory
