= What Did the Biblical Writers Know and When Did They Know It? =

2001 book by William G. Dever

- Author: William G. Dever
- Subject: Israeli history
- Publisher: Eerdmans
- Publication date: 2001
- ISBN: 978-0-8028-2126-3
- LC Class: 46394298
- Followed by: Who Were the Early Israelites and Where Did They Come from?

What Did the Biblical Writers Know and When Did They Know It? What Archaeology Can Tell Us about the Reality of Ancient Israel is a 2001 book by biblical scholar and archaeologist William G. Dever detailing his response to the claims of minimalists to the historicity and value of the Hebrew Bible. The book was also conceived as a response to Thomas L. Thompson's minimalist book The Bible in History.

== Summary ==
Dever's book is a response to recent trends in biblical scholarship and biblical archaeology which question whether the Bible can be used as a reliable tool for interpreting history.

The book begins with Dever's explanation of the "minimalist" position, which holds that the Bible is a product of the Persian or even Hellenistic periods, composed at the very earliest after c. 500 BC, and therefore unreliable as a record of earlier periods. The minimalists do not deny that the biblical books are based on genuinely old material, but they view the task of extracting that material from layers of revision and accretion as virtually unachievable. At the other extreme are the biblical maximalists who take the Bible at, or almost entirely at, face value. In his first two chapters Dever reviews and rejects both minimalism and maximalism. Dever nevertheless evidently regards the minimalist position as more dangerous than the maximalist, because it tends to eliminate altogether any study of ancient Israel prior to the Persian period.

In selecting the parts of the Bible that can be used to reconstruct Ancient Israel's history, Dever discards the Torah (Genesis, Exodus, Leviticus, Numbers and Deuteronomy) and the Book of Joshua, whose content he regards as essentially mythical or legendary. He also discards the Book of Psalms (which he regards as a liturgical book with little historical value), the Book of Proverbs and Ecclesiastes (collections of wisdom-sayings, some quite late and others reflecting non-Israelite influence), the Books of Ruth, Esther, Job and Daniel (historical novellae reflecting periods as late as the Maccabean Revolt), the Song of Songs (a cycle of erotic love-songs) and a number of Minor Prophets writings. He also believes the Books of Chronicles are of little use, since they are clearly dependent on the Books of Samuel and Kings, though he recognizes that they may have some independent traditions of occasional historical use.

Dever then turns to Syrio-Palestinian archaeology, as the former discipline of biblical archaeology is now known, and reviews material discoveries to demonstrate that they can in fact be linked to the biblical narrative. The central chapters therefore offer a detailed discussion of the major archaeological discoveries of the twentieth century and relate them to the Deuteronomistic History (Joshua-2 Kings), "correlat[ing] text and artifact to demonstrate that significant material in the narrative plausibly derives from Iron Age II (ca. 1000-600 BCE) and not from later periods."

Dever makes clear that he positions himself in the middle ground between minimalists on the one hand, and maximalists on the other. "While the Hebrew Bible in its present, heavily edited form cannot be taken at face value as history in the modern sense, it nevertheless contains much history." For Dever, this historical core is concentrated in the period from David onwards; the Torah and the period of the conquest of Canaan he regards as essentially mythical. The final chapter sums up the argument of the book, stating that there was an ancient Israel, that the Bible was written from a genuine historical core, and that archaeology can identify this core and prevent Israel from being "written out of history".

== Reception and reviews ==
Minimalist scholar Philip R. Davies, who is often criticized by Dever in the book, criticized Dever on personal grounds, while questioning his central thesis:

"[Dever's] agendas are that (a) a coordinated team of 'minimalists'/'revisionist' biblical historians are conspiring to deny the existence of ancient Israel (and even of historical 'facts' at all!); (b) Dever has been, and remains, the guardian of truth in matters archaeological; and (c) archaeology can confirm the reliability of Biblical history. The first two of these issues obscure the central thesis."

Peter James was critical of Dever's work, accusing Dever of dismissing contrary evidence without argument and failing to engage with detail as against wider cultural context:

"If Dever’s attempts to link narrative biblical history and archaeology represent mainstream thinking (as he claims), then the field is indeed in deep trouble. It is the kind of blind acceptance of traditional (unsubstantiated) 'synchronisms' espoused by Dever that has provided the very fuel for the minimalists’ criticisms. In short, Dever may prove to be his own worst enemy."

In his book On the Reliability of the Old Testament, evangelical scholar Kenneth Kitchen criticizes Dever for not supporting the historicity of the Pentateuch and of the Book of Joshua, but praises him for his defence of the Bible from the Book of Judges onward:

"In his What Did the Biblical Writers Know and When Did They Know It?, we have a robust and very valuable reply to minimalists, ruthlessly exposing their suspect agendas and sham "scholarship", following on from his refutations of Finkelstein's archaeological revisionism. It should be read and appreciated (from the period 1200 B.C. onward) for his firsthand contribution on the archaeological aspects, as well in conjunction with this book. There is much solid rock here, and all of us may rejoice in that fact".
