= Biblical minimalism =

Movement in biblical scholarship

Biblical minimalism, also known as the Copenhagen School because two of its most prominent figures taught at Copenhagen University, is a movement or trend in biblical scholarship that began in the 1990s with two main claims:

1. that the Bible cannot be considered reliable evidence for what had happened in ancient Israel; and
2. that "Israel" itself is a problematic subject for historical study.

Minimalism is not a unified movement, but rather a label that came to be applied to several scholars at different universities who held similar views, chiefly Niels Peter Lemche and Thomas L. Thompson at the University of Copenhagen, Philip R. Davies, and Keith Whitelam. Minimalism gave rise to intense debate during the 1990s—the term "minimalists" was in fact a derogatory one given by its opponents, who were consequently dubbed "maximalists", but in fact neither side accepted either label.

Maximalists, or neo-Albrightians, are composed of two quite distinct groups, the first represented by the archaeologist William Dever and the influential publication Biblical Archaeology Review, the second by biblical scholar Iain Provan and Egyptologist Kenneth Kitchen. Although these debates were in some cases heated, most scholars occupied the middle ground, evaluating the arguments of both schools critically.

Since the 1990s, while some of the minimalist arguments (i.e. the Bible should not be used in archaeology) have been challenged or rejected, others have been refined and adopted into the mainstream of biblical scholarship (i.e. claims about Exodus, Israelite Conquest, United Monarchy).

== Background ==
By the opening of the 20th century the stories of the Creation, Noah's Ark, and the Tower of Babel—in short, chapters 1 to 11 of the Book of Genesis—had become subject to greater scrutiny by scholars, and the starting point for biblical history was regarded as the stories of Abraham, Isaac, and the other Hebrew patriarchs. Then in the 1970s, largely through the publication of two books, Thomas L. Thompson's The Historicity of the Patriarchal Narratives and John Van Seters' Abraham in History and Tradition, it became widely accepted that the remaining chapters of Genesis were not historical. At the same time, archaeology and comparative sociology convinced most scholars in the field that there was little historical basis to the biblical stories of the Exodus and the Israelite conquest of Canaan.

By the 1980s, the Hebrew Bible's stories of the Patriarchs, the Exodus from Egypt and Conquest of Canaan were no longer considered historical, but biblical histories continued to use the Bible as a primary source and to take the form of narrative records of political events arranged in chronological order, with the major role played by (largely Judean) kings and other high-status individuals. At the same time, new tools and approaches were being brought to bear on scholars' knowledge of the past of ancient Canaan, notably new archaeological methods and approaches (for example, this was the age of surface surveys, used to map population changes which are invisible in the biblical narrative), and the social sciences (an important work in this vein was Robert Coote and Keith Whitlam's The Emergence of Early Israel in Historical Perspective, which used sociological data to argue, in contradiction to the biblical picture, that it was kingship that formed Israel, and not the other way round).

Then in the 1990s a school of thought emerged from the background of the 1970s and 1980s which held that the entire enterprise of studying ancient Israel and its history was seriously flawed by an overreliance on the biblical text, which was too problematic (meaning untrustworthy) to be used even selectively as a source for Israel's past, and that Israel itself was in any case a problematic subject. This movement came to be known as biblical minimalism.

== Biblical minimalism ==
The scholars that have come to be called "minimalists" are not a unified group, and in fact deny that they form a group or "school": Philip Davies points out that while he argues that the bulk of the Bible can be dated to the Persian period (the 5th century BCE), Niels Peter Lemche prefers the Hellenistic period (3rd to 2nd centuries BCE), while Whitelam has not given any opinion at all. Similarly, while Lemche holds that the Tel Dan stele (an inscription from the mid-9th century BCE which seems to mention the name of David) is probably a forgery, Davies and Whitelam do not. In short, the minimalists do not agree on much more than that the Bible is a doubtful source of information about ancient Israel.

=== Bible as a historical source document ===
The first of the minimalists' two central claims is based on the premise that history-writing is never objective, but involves the selection of data and the construction of a narrative using preconceived ideas of the meaning of the past—the fact that history is thus never neutral or objective raises questions about the accuracy of any historical account. The minimalists cautioned that the literary form of the biblical history books is so apparent and the authors' intentions so obvious that scholars should be extremely cautious in taking them at face value. Even if the Bible does preserve some accurate information, researchers lack the means to sift that information from the inventions with which it may have been mixed.

The minimalists did not claim that the Bible is useless as a historical source; rather, they suggest that its proper use is in understanding the period in which it was written, a period which some of them place in the Persian period (5th–4th centuries BCE) and others in the Hellenistic period (3rd–2nd centuries).

=== Historicity of the nation of Israel ===
The second claim is that "Israel" itself is a difficult idea to define in terms of historiography. There is, firstly, the idealised Israel which the Bible authors created—"biblical Israel". In the words of Niels Peter Lemche:

The Israelite nation as explained by the biblical writers has little in the way of a historical background. It is a highly ideological construct created by ancient scholars of Jewish tradition in order to legitimize their own religious community and its religio-political claims on land and religious exclusivity.

— Lemche 1998, pp. 165–66

Modern scholars have taken aspects of biblical Israel and married them with data from archaeological and non-biblical sources to create their own version of a past Israel—"Ancient Israel". Neither bears much relationship to the kingdom destroyed by Assyria in about 722 BCE—"historical Israel". The real subjects for history-writing in the modern period are either this historical Israel or else the biblical Israel, the first a historical reality and the second an intellectual creation of the biblical authors. Linked with this was the observation that modern biblical scholars had concentrated their attentions exclusively on Israel, Judah, and their religious history, while ignoring the fact that these had been only a fairly insignificant part of a wider whole.

== Important works ==
- In Search of Ancient Israel (Philip R. Davies, 1992)

Davies' book "popularised the scholarly conversation and crystallised the import of the emerging scholarly positions" regarding the history of Israel between the 10th and 6th centuries—in other words, it summarised current research and thinking rather than proposing anything original. It was, nevertheless, a watershed work in that it drew together the new interpretations that were emerging from archaeology: the study of texts, sociology and anthropology. Davies argued that scholars needed to distinguish between the three meanings of the word Israel: the historical ancient kingdom of that name (historical Israel); the idealised Israel of the biblical authors writing in the Persian era and seeking to unify the post-exilic Jerusalem community by creating a common past (biblical Israel); and the Israel that had been created by modern scholars over the past century or so by blending together the first two (which he termed ancient Israel, in recognition of the widespread use of this phrase in scholarly histories). "Ancient Israel", he argued, was especially problematic: biblical scholars ran the risk of placing far too much confidence in their reconstructions through relying too heavily on "biblical Israel", the Bible's highly ideological version of a society that had already ceased to exist when the bulk of the biblical books reached their final form.

- The Invention of Ancient Israel (Keith Whitelam, 1996)

Subtitled "The Silencing of Palestinian History", Whitelam criticised his peers for their concentration on Israel and Judah to the exclusion of the many other peoples and kingdoms that had existed in Iron Age Palestine. Palestinian history for the period from 13th century BCE to the 2nd century CE had been ignored, and scholars had concentrated instead on political, social, and above all religious developments in the small entity of Israel. This, he argued, supported the contemporary claim to the land of Palestine by the descendants of Israel, while keeping biblical studies in the realm of religion rather than history.

- The Israelites in History and Tradition (Niels Peter Lemche, 1998)
- The Mythic Past (Thomas L. Thompson, 1999)

The subtitle of the US edition of The Mythic Past was "Biblical Archaeology and the Myth of Israel", a phrase almost guaranteed to cause controversy in America. The European title, The Bible in History: How Writers Create a Past, was perhaps more descriptive of its actual theme: the need to treat the Bible as literature rather than as history—"The Bible's language is not a historical language. It is a language of high literature, of story, of sermon and of song. It is a tool of philosophy and moral instruction." This was Thompson's attempt to set the minimalist position before a wider public; it became the cause of a rejoinder by William Dever, What Did the Biblical Writers Know and When Did They Know It?, which in turn led to a bitter public dispute between the two.

== Reception and influence ==
The ideas of the minimalists generated considerable controversy during the 1990s and the early part of the 21st century. Some conservative scholars reacted defensively, attempting to show that the details of the Bible were in fact consistent with having been written by contemporaries (against the minimalist claim that they were largely the work of the Persian or Hellenistic periods). A notable work in this camp was Kenneth Kitchen's On the Reliability of the Old Testament. Taking a different approach, A Biblical History of Israel, by Iain Provan, V. Philips Long, and Tremper Longman III, argued that criterion of distrust set by the minimalists (the Bible should be regarded as unreliable unless directly confirmed by external sources) was unreasonable, and that it should be regarded as reliable unless directly falsified. Avi Hurvitz compared biblical Hebrew with the Hebrew from ancient inscriptions and found it consistent with the period before the Persian period, thus questioning the key minimalist contention that the biblical books were written several centuries after the events they describe. Takamitsu Muraoka also argues against the hypothesis that the entire Hebrew Bible was composed in the Persian period, associated with some minimalists like Davies, countering that there are specifically late Biblical Hebrew features, like some rare plene spellings, that are contained in books dated to the Persian era by minimalists as well, but unusual or absent elsewhere.

In the scholarly mainstream, historians of ancient Israel have partially adapted their methodologies by relying less on the Bible and more on sociological models and archaeological evidence. Scholars such as Lester L. Grabbe (Ancient Israel: What Do We Know and How Do We Know It?, 2007), Victor H. Matthews (Studying the Ancient Israelites: A Guide to Sources and Methods, 2007), and Hans Barstad (History and the Hebrew Bible, 2008) simply put the evidence before the reader and explain the issues, rather than attempt to write histories; others such as K.L. Knoll (Canaan and Israel in Antiquity, 2001) attempt to include Israel in a broader treatment of Syria-Palestine/Canaan. This is not to say that the ideas of the minimalists are completely adopted in modern study of ancient Israel: Mario Liverani, for example (Israel's History and the History of Israel, 2005), accepts that the biblical sources are from the Persian period, but believes that the minimalists have not truly understood that context nor recognised the importance of the ancient sources used by the authors. Thus positions that do not fit either a minimalist or a maximalist position are now being expressed.

The impression one has now is that the debate has settled down. Although they do not seem to admit it, the minimalists have triumphed in many ways. That is, most scholars reject the historicity of the 'patriarchal period', see the settlement as mostly made up of indigenous inhabitants of Canaan and are cautious about the early monarchy. The exodus is rejected or assumed to be based on an event much different from the biblical account. On the other hand, there is not the widespread rejection of the biblical text as a historical source that one finds among the main minimalists. There are few, if any, maximalists (defined as those who accept the biblical text unless it can be absolutely disproved) in mainstream scholarship, only on the more fundamentalist fringes.

— Grabbe 2017, p. 36

== See also ==
- Atheism
- Historicity of the Bible

== Bibliography ==
- Banks, Diane (2006). Writing The History Of Israel. Continuum International Publishing Group. ISBN 9780567026620.
- Cogan, Mordechai (2008). The Raging Torrent: historical inscriptions from Assyria and Babylonia relating to ancient Israel. Carta.
- Davies, Philip R. (1995). In Search of 'Ancient Israel'. Continuum International Publishing Group. ISBN 9781850757375.
- Davies, Philip R. (2000). Minimalism, 'Ancient Israel', and Anti-Semitism. The Bible and Interpretation. Archived from the original on 2008-10-21.
- Grabbe, Lester L. (2017). Ancient Israel: What Do We Know and How Do We Know It?: Revised Edition. Bloomsbury Publishing. p. 36. ISBN 978-0-567-67044-1.
- Lemche, Niels Peter (1998). The Israelites in History and Tradition. Westminster John Knox Press. ISBN 9780664227272.
- Moore, Megan Bishop; Kelle, Brad E. (2011). Biblical History and Israel's Past. Eerdmans. ISBN 9780802862600.
- Joüon, P.; Muraoka, Takamitsu (2006). A Grammar of Biblical Hebrew (Second ed.). Gregorian & Biblical Press. ISBN 9788876536298.
- Thompson, Thomas L. (1999). The Mythic Past: Biblical Archaeology And The Myth Of Israel. Basic Book.
- Whitelam, Keith W. (1996). The Invention of Ancient Israel. Routledge. ISBN 9780415107587.
