= Biblical maximalism =

Affirms the historicity of central Biblical narratives

Biblical maximalism is the movement in Biblical scholarship that, as opposed to Biblical minimalism, affirms the historicity of central Biblical narratives, such as those pertaining to the United Monarchy, and the historical authenticity of ancient Israel as a whole. Due to differences between the Bible and 19th- and 20th-century archaeological findings, there exist discrepancies between these two parties of biblical exegetists: the biblical maximalists argue that prior to Judaism's Babylonian Captivity (the period that spanned the 6th-century B.C.), the Bible serves an accurate historical source and should influence the conclusions drawn from archaeological studies; whereas biblical minimalists assert that the Bible must be read as fiction, unless proven otherwise by archaeological findings, and ought not be considered in secular studies.

The debate between the two parties primarily revolves around one major issue in the sphere of biblical interpretation: the existence, or nonexistence, of the united kingdom of Solomon and David. Minimalists argue that this kingdom must have been different from the one presented in the biblical texts—1 Kings and 2 Samuel, for example—stating that the current archaeological evidence does not indicate that a state organization of the kind once existed. Maximalists, on the other hand, hold that the archeological evidence currently uncovered is sufficient to prove the existence of the United Monarchy.

Because of their disagreements, minimalist–maximalist relations have been characterized by inflamed rhetoric and frequent personal attacks.

== Notable biblical maximalists ==
- Kenneth Kitchen (1932–2025), Personal and Brunner Professor Emeritus of Egyptology of the University of Liverpool
- James K. Hoffmeier (born 1951), Professor of Old Testament and Ancient Near Eastern History and Archaeology at Trinity Evangelical Divinity School
- Eilat Mazar (1956–2021), archaeologist of the Hebrew University of Jerusalem
- Iain Provan (born 1957), Marshall Sheppard Professor of Biblical Studies at Regent College
- V. Philips Long, Professor of Old Testament at Regent College
- Tremper Longman III (born 1952), former professor of Old Testament at Westminster Theological Seminary
- Richard S. Hess (born 1954), Earl S. Kalland Professor of Old Testament and Semitic Languages at Denver Seminary

== Important maximalist works ==
- Kitchen, Kenneth. On the Reliability of the Old Testament. (Grand Rapids and Cambridge: William B. Eerdmans Publishing Company, 2002);
- Hoffmeier James K. Israel in Egypt: the evidence for the authenticity of the Exodus tradition. (New York: Oxford University Press, 1996);
- Hoffmeier, James K. Ancient Israel in Sinai: the evidence for the authenticity of the wilderness tradition (New York: Oxford University Press, 2005);
- Longman, Tremper; Provan, Iain William; Long, V. Philips. A Biblical History of Israel. (Louisville: Westminster John Knox Press, 2003, second edition 2015).
- Hess, Richard S. Israelite Religions: An Archaeological and Biblical Survey. (Ada, Michigan: Baker Academic, 2007, second edition 2017)

== See also ==
- Biblical minimalism
- Historicity of the Bible
- Bible
- The Exodus
- Biblical archaeology
- Biblical archaeology school
- Battle of Aphek
