= The Bible in History =

1999 book by Thomas L. Thompson

The Bible in History: How Writers Create a Past
- Author: Thomas L. Thompson
- Language: English
- Genre: Non-fiction
- Publisher: Pimlico
- Publication date: 1999

The Bible in History: How Writers Create a Past, (Pimlico, 1999), is a book by Thomas L. Thompson, Professor of Old Testament at the University of Copenhagen. Its US title is The Mythic Past: Biblical Archaeology and the Myth of Israel.

== Summary ==
The theme of The Bible in History is the need to treat the bible as literature rather than as history. Danny Yee cites a passage: "The Bible's language is not an historical language. It is a language of high literature, of story, of sermon and of song. It is a tool of philosophy and moral instruction."

Part 1 deals with general historiographical issues, including the importance of understanding the types and purposes of different biblical stories, the dangers of treating myth and poetry as history, and the use of origin-myths as recurring motifs, concluding that the bible was intended to provide an ancient people with a common past, and thus was very different from our own tradition of critical history-writing. Part 2 is a history of ancient Palestine and the surrounding region from the earliest human settlement to the Hellenistic period drawing on the most recent archaeological and historical studies, and Part 3 concludes with a survey of the theological implications of the preceding study.

== The minimalist/maximalist debate ==
Thompson is a leading biblical minimalist, a group of like-minded scholars including Niels Peter Lemche, Philip R. Davies, and Keith W. Whitelam among others who say that the Hebrew Bible cannot be treated as history, because it was not intended as history. The minimalist argument has been received with emotions bordering on outrage by other scholars, particularly those known as "maximalists". The debate has been frequently framed in political terms, with the minimalists accused of subverting the existence of the modern state of Israel and worse. "The Bible in History", Thompson's attempt to summarise the minimalist thesis and set it before a wider public, was the immediate cause for William G. Dever's rejoinder, What Did the Biblical Writers Know and When Did They Know It?, (2001), which then led into a long and frequently heated debate (in which Davies, rather than Thompson, championed the minimalist side) on the merits of the bible as history.
