= Tel Dan stele =

Stele inscribed in Aramaic referencing the House of David

Tel Dan Stele
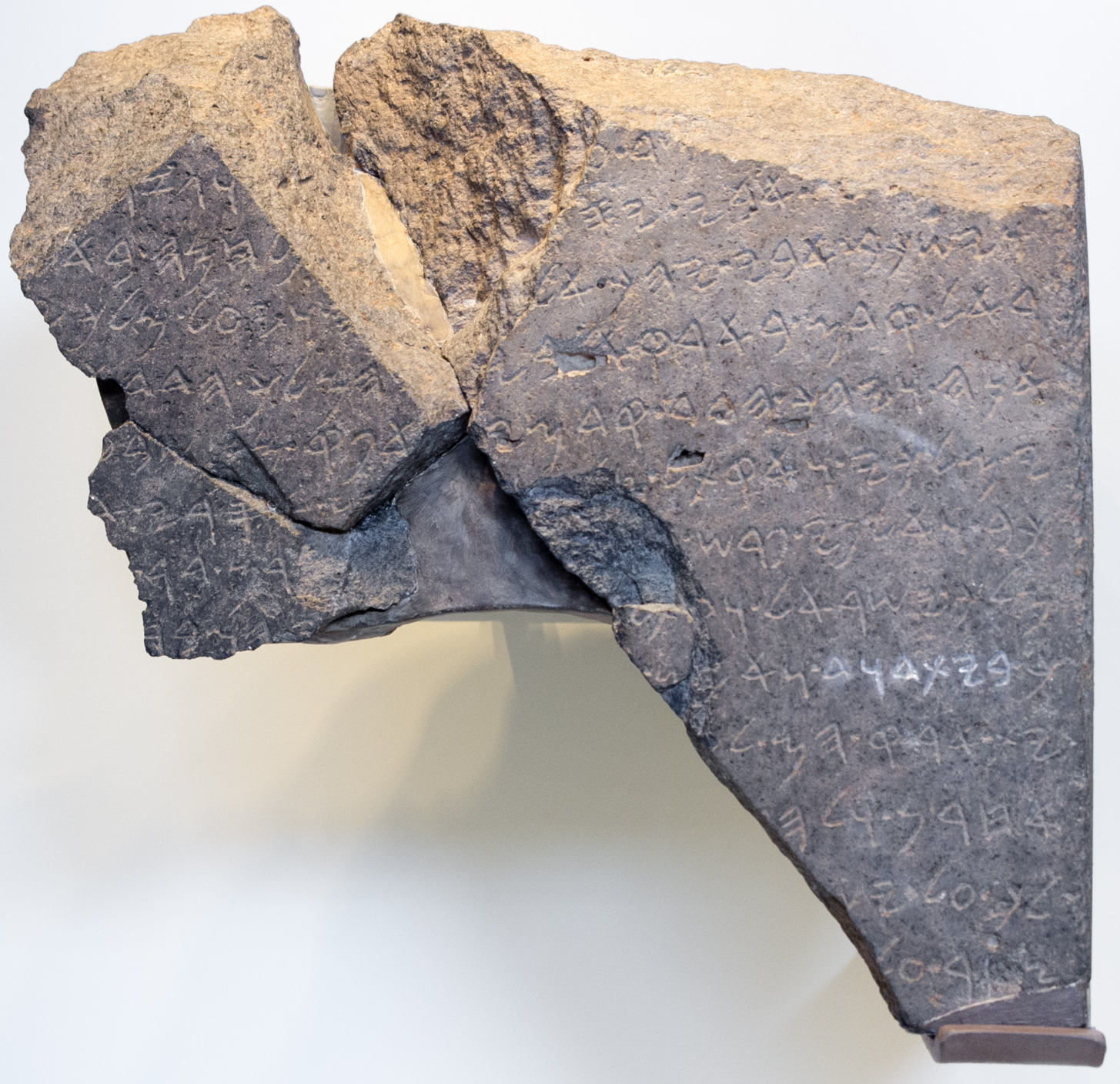
- Tel Dan Stele, Israel Museum. Highlighted in white: the sequence B Y T D W D.
- Material: Basalt
- Writing: Old Aramaic (Phoenician alphabet)
- Created: 870–750 BCE
- Discovered: 1993–94
- Present location: Israel Museum

The Tel Dan Stele is a fragmentary stele with an Old Aramaic inscription written in the Phoenician script. It is generally dated to the 9th-century BCE, though some scholars have proposed later dates; it is one of the earliest, extra-biblical references to a Davidic dynasty. In 1993, it was discovered by Gila Cook, a member of an archaeological team led by Avraham Biran, among the rubble of a wall that had survived to modern times in Tel-Dan. Currently, it is on display at the Israel Museum.

The consensus translation of the inscription details an individual who killed Jehoram of Israel, son of Ahab and Jezebel, and Ahaziah of Judah, son of Ahab "of the house of David..." (according to the stele, though some scholars disagree). This description aligns well with Hazael, king of Aram-Damascus (who conquered Israel but not Jerusalem), for which reason he is a likely candidate for the one who originally erected the stele:

At that time King Hazael of Aram went up, fought against Gath, and took it. But when Hazael set his face to go up against Jerusalem, King Jehoash of Judah took all the votive gifts that Jehoshaphat, Jehoram, and Ahaziah, his ancestors, the kings of Judah, had dedicated, as well as his own votive gifts, all the gold that was found in the treasuries of the house of the Lᴏʀᴅ and of the king's house, and sent these to King Hazael of Aram. Then Hazael withdrew from Jerusalem.

== Discovery and description ==
Fragment A of the stele was discovered in July 1993 by Gila Cook of Avraham Biran's team who was studying Tel Dan in northern Israel. Fragments B1 and B2 were found in June 1994. The stele was not excavated in its "primary context", but in its "secondary use". The fragments were published by Biran and his colleague Joseph Naveh in 1993 and 1995.

=== Overview ===
The Tel Dan stele consists of three fragments making up part of a triumphal inscription in Old Aramaic, left most probably by Hazael of Aram-Damascus, an important regional figure in the late 9th century BCE. The unnamed king boasts of his victories over the king of Israel and his apparent ally the king of the "House of David" (Old Aramaic: 𐤁𐤉𐤕𐤃𐤅𐤃, romanized: bytdwd). It is considered the earliest widely accepted reference to the name David as the founder of a Judahite polity outside of the Hebrew Bible, though the earlier Mesha Stele contains several possible references with varying acceptance.

A minority of scholars has disputed the reference to David, due to the lack of a word divider between byt and dwd, and other translations have been proposed. The Tel Dan stele is one of only four known extra-biblical inscriptions made during a roughly 400-year period (1200–800 BCE) containing the name "Israel", the others being the Merneptah Stele, the Mesha Stele, and the Kurkh Monoliths.

The Tel Dan inscription generated considerable debate and a flurry of articles, debating its age, authorship, and authenticity; however, the stele is generally accepted by scholars as genuine and a reference to the house of David.

=== Text ===
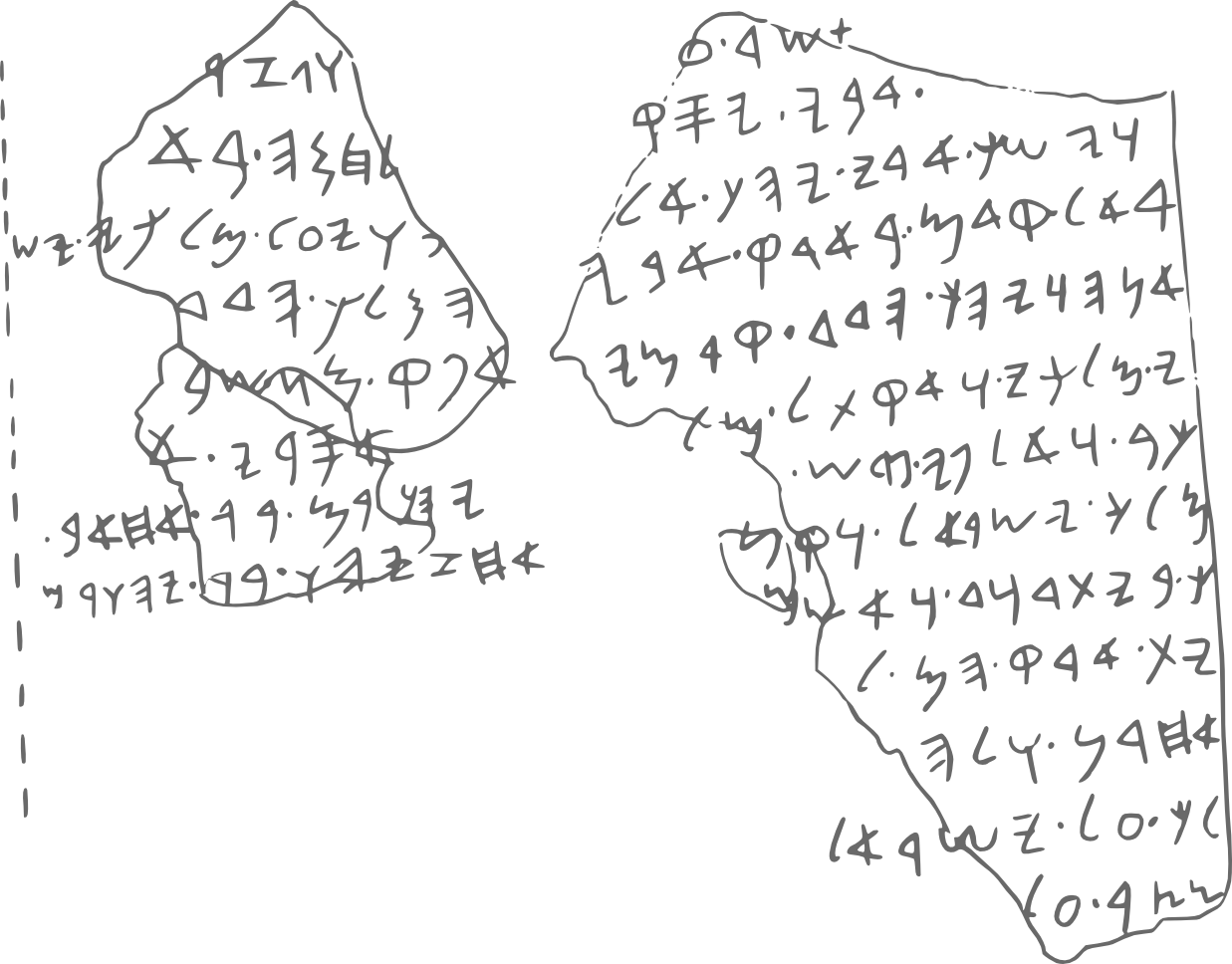
The Tel Dan Stele: Fragment A is to the right, Fragments B1 and B2 to the left

The following is the transcription. Dots separate words (as in the original), empty square brackets indicate damaged/missing text, and text inside square brackets is reconstructed by Biran and Naveh:

1. [ 𐤀]𐤌𐤓.𐤏[ ]𐤅𐤂𐤆𐤓[ ]

2. [ ---].𐤀𐤁𐤉.𐤉𐤎𐤒[.𐤏𐤋𐤅𐤄.𐤁𐤄]𐤕𐤋𐤇𐤌𐤄.𐤁𐤀[ ]
3. 𐤅𐤉𐤔𐤊𐤁.𐤀𐤁𐤉.𐤉𐤄𐤊.𐤀𐤋[.𐤀𐤁𐤄𐤅]𐤄.𐤅𐤉𐤏𐤋.𐤌𐤋𐤊𐤉[ 𐤉𐤔]
4. 𐤓𐤀𐤋.𐤒𐤃𐤌.𐤁𐤀𐤓𐤒.𐤀𐤁𐤉[.𐤅]𐤄𐤌𐤋𐤊.𐤄𐤃𐤃[.]𐤀[𐤉𐤕𐤉]
5. 𐤀𐤍𐤄.𐤅𐤉𐤄𐤊.𐤄𐤃𐤃.𐤒𐤃𐤌𐤉[.𐤅]𐤀𐤐𐤒.𐤌𐤍.𐤔𐤁𐤏[𐤕---]
6. 𐤉.𐤌𐤋𐤊𐤉.𐤅𐤀𐤒𐤕𐤋.𐤌𐤋[𐤊𐤍.𐤔𐤁]𐤏𐤍.𐤀𐤎𐤓𐤉.𐤀[𐤋𐤐𐤉.𐤓]
7. 𐤊𐤁.𐤅𐤀𐤋𐤐𐤉.𐤐𐤓𐤔.[𐤒𐤕𐤋𐤕.𐤀𐤉𐤕.𐤉𐤄𐤅]𐤓𐤌.𐤁𐤓.[𐤀𐤇𐤀𐤁.]
8. 𐤌𐤋𐤊.𐤉𐤔𐤓𐤀𐤋.𐤅𐤒𐤕𐤋[𐤕.𐤀𐤉𐤕.𐤀𐤇𐤆]𐤉𐤄𐤅.𐤁𐤓[.𐤉𐤄𐤅𐤓𐤌.𐤌𐤋]
9. 𐤊.𐤁𐤉𐤕𐤃𐤅𐤃.𐤅𐤀𐤔𐤌.[𐤀𐤉𐤕.𐤒𐤓𐤉𐤕.𐤄𐤌.𐤇𐤓𐤁𐤕.𐤅𐤀𐤄𐤐𐤊.𐤀]
10. 𐤉𐤕.𐤀𐤓𐤒.𐤄𐤌.𐤋[𐤉𐤔𐤌𐤍 ]
11. 𐤀𐤇𐤓𐤍.𐤅𐤋𐤄[... 𐤅𐤉𐤄𐤅𐤀.𐤌]
12. 𐤋𐤊.𐤏𐤋.𐤉𐤔[𐤓𐤀𐤋... 𐤅𐤀𐤔𐤌.]

13. 𐤌𐤑𐤓.𐤏[𐤋. ]

Romanized:

1. [ ʾ]mr.ʿ[ ]wgzr[ ]
2. [ ---].ʾby.ysq[.ʿlwh.bh]tlḥmh.bʾ[ ]
3. wyškb.ʾby.yhk.ʾl[.ʾbhw]h.wyʿl.mlky[ yś]
4. rʾl.qdm.bʾrq.ʾby[.w]hmlk.hdd[.]ʾ[yty]
5. ʾnh.wyhk.hdd.qdmy[.w]ʾpq.mn.šbʿ[t---]
6. y.mlky.wʾqtl.ml[kn.šb]ʿn.ʾsry.ʾ[lpy.r]
7. kb.wʾlpy.prš.[qtlt.ʾyt.yhw]rm.br.[ʾḥʾb.]
8. mlk.yśrʾl.wqtl[t.ʾyt.ʾḥz]yhw.br[.yhwrm.ml]
9. k.bytdwd.wʾšm.[ʾyt.qryt.hm.ḥrbt.wʾhpk.ʾ]
10. yt.ʾrq.hm.l[yšmn ]
11. ʾḥrn.wlh[... wyhwʾ.m]
12. lk.ʿl.yś[rʾl... wʾšm.]
13. mṣr.ʿ[l. ]

The 1995 translation by Biran reads;

1. [ ]...[...] and cut [...]
2. [...] my father went up [against him when h]e fought at [...]
3. and my father lay down, he went to his [ancestors (viz. became sick and died)]. And the king of I[s-]
4. rael entered previously in my father's land, [and] Hadad made me king,
5. And Hadad went in front of me, [and] I departed from the seven [...-]
6. s of my kingdom, and I slew [seve]nty kin[gs], who harnessed th[ousands of cha-]
7. riots and thousands of horsemen (or: horses). [I killed Jeho]ram son [of Ahab]
8. king of Israel, and [I] killed [Ahaz]iahu son of [Jehoram kin-]
9. g of the House of David, and I set [their towns into ruins and turned ]
10. their land into [desolation ]
11. other [... and Jehu ru-]
12. led over Is[rael and I laid]
13. siege upon [ ]

Other scholars have presented alternate translations. For example, Andre Lemaire's 1998 translation reads;

1. [.....]..[.............] and cut [..............]
2. [.....] my father went up [......f]ighting at/against Ab[...]
3. And my father lay down, he went to his [fathers]. And the kings of I[s-]
4. rael penetrated into my father's land[. And] Hadad made me - myself - king
5. And Hadad went in front of me[, and] I departed from .... [....]
6. of my kings. And I killed two power[ful] kin[gs], who harnessed two thou[sand cha-]
7. riots and two thousand horsemen. [I killed Jo]ram son of [Ahab]
8. king of Israel, and I killed [Achaz]yahu son of [Joram king]
9. of the House of David. And I set [......]
10. their land [.......]
11. other ...[............ and Jehu ru-]
12. led over Is[rael ............]
13. siege upon [.......]

The main differences are on line 6 and 7; Lemaire suggests that two kings, rather than seventy, were killed and that they possessed two thousand chariots and horsemen.

=== Content ===
In the second half of the 9th century BCE (the most widely accepted date for the stele), the kingdom of Aram-Damascus, under its ruler Hazael, was a major power in the Levant. Dan, just 70 miles from Hazael's capital of Damascus, would almost certainly have come under its sway. This is borne out by the archaeological evidence: Israelite remains do not appear until the 8th century BCE, and apparently Dan was already in the orbit of Damascus even before Hazael became king in c. 843 BCE.

The author of the inscription mentions conflict with the kings of Israel and the 'House of David'. The names of the two enemy kings are only partially legible. Biran and Naveh reconstructed them as Joram, son of Ahab, King of Israel, and Ahaziah, son of Joram of the House of David. Scholars seem to be evenly divided on these identifications. It is dependent on a particular arrangement of the fragments, and not all scholars agree on this.

In the reconstructed text, the author tells how Israel had invaded his country in his father's day, and how the god Hadad then made him king and marched with him against Israel. The author then reports that he defeated seventy kings with thousands of chariots and horses (more on this below). In the very last line there is a suggestion of a siege, possibly of Samaria, the capital of the kings of Israel. This reading is, however, disputed.

== Interpretation and disputes ==
=== Configuration ===
The stele was found in three fragments, called A, B1 and B2. There is widespread agreement that all three belong to the same inscription, and that B1 and B2 belong together. There is less agreement over the fit between A and the combined B1/B2: Biran and Naveh placed B1/B2 to the left of A (the photograph at the top of this article). A few scholars have disputed this, William Schniedewind proposing some minor adjustments to the same fit, Gershon Galil placing B above A rather than beside it, and George Athas fitting it well below.

=== Dating ===
Archaeologists and epigraphers put the earliest possible date at about 870 BCE, whilst the latest possible date is "less clear", although according to Lawrence J. Mykytiuk it could "hardly have been much later than 750". However, some scholars (mainly associated with the Copenhagen school) – Niels Peter Lemche, Thomas L. Thompson, and F. H. Cryer – have proposed still later datings.

=== Cracks and inscription ===
Two biblical scholars, Cryer and Lemche, analyzed the cracks and chisel marks around the fragment and also the lettering towards the edges of the fragments. From this they concluded that the text was in fact a modern forgery. Most scholars have ignored or rejected these judgments because the artifacts were recovered during controlled excavations.

=== Authorship ===
The language of the inscription is a dialect of Aramaic. Most scholars identify Hazael of Damascus (c. 842 – 806 BCE) as the author, although his name is not mentioned. Other proposals regarding the author have been made: George Athas has argued for Hazael's son Ben-Hadad III, which would date the inscription to around 796 BCE, and Jan-Wim Wesselius has argued for Jehu of Israel (r. c. 845 – 818 BCE).

=== "Seventy kings" ===
While the original translators proposed that line 6 of the inscription refers to the slaying of "seventy kings", later epigraphers have offered alternative readings. Nadav Na'aman proposed that the line should be read as Hazael slew "mighty kings". According to Lemaire, "the reading 'seventy' is based only on a very small fragment of a letter which is interpreted as part of an 'ayin but could also be part of another letter". He proposed that the inscription should instead grammatically be read as "two kings" were slain, in line with the subsequent description of the inscription of only having defeated two kings. Other scholars have followed and further developed Lemaire's reading.

Matthew Suriano has defended the "seventy" reading, arguing that it is a symbolic trope in ancient near eastern military language, representing the defeat of all other claimants to power. Noting that Hazael was himself a usurper to the throne of Aram-Damascus, he argues that ancient Syria would have posited a number of other rivals for the throne and that Hazael's claim to have slain "seventy kings" is a reference to him defeating his rivals in succession to the throne of Aram-Damascus.

=== "House of David" ===
Since 1993–1994, when the first fragment was discovered and published, the Tel Dan stele has been the object of great interest and debate among epigraphers and biblical scholars. Its significance for the biblical version of Israel's past lies particularly in lines 8 and 9, which mention a "king of Israel" and possibly a "house of David". The latter reading is accepted by a majority of scholars, but not all.

Dissenting scholars note that word dividers are employed elsewhere throughout the inscription, and one would expect to find one between byt and dwd in bytdwd too if the intended reading was "House of David". They contend that reading dwd as "David" is complicated since the word can also mean "uncle" (dōd) (a word with a rather wider meaning in ancient times than it has today), "beloved", or "kettle" (dūd). Lemche and Athas suggests that bytdwd could be a place-name and Athas that it refers to Jerusalem (so that the author might be claiming to have killed the son of the king of Jerusalem, rather than the son of the king from the "house of David"). R.G. Lehmann and M. Reichel proposes interpreting the phrase as a reference to the name or epithet of a deity.

According to Anson Rainey the presence or absence of word dividers is normally inconsequential for interpretation. Word dividers as well as compound words are used elsewhere in the inscription and generally in West Semitic languages, so it is possible that the phrase was treated as a compound word combining a personal name with a relational noun. Mykytiuk argues that readings other than "House of David" are unlikely. Yosef Garfinkel has been vocally critical of alternate translations, characterizing them as "suggestions that now seem ridiculous: The Hebrew bytdwd should be read not as the House of David, but as a place named betdwd, in parallel to the well-known place-name Ashdod. Other minimalist suggestions included House of Uncle, House of Kettle and House of Beloved."

Francesca Stavrakopoulou states that even if the inscription refers to a "House of David" it testifies neither to the historicity of David nor to the existence of a 9th-century BCE united Israelite and Judahite kingdom. Stavrakopoulou specified that if the disputed rendering of "bytdwd" can indeed be rendered as the above, it can still be referring to a small ruling family whose legendary founder was named "David" or "Beloved". This assessment she considered supported by the king of Israel being distinguished from it, showing there were many local and regional powers. Garfinkel argues that, combined with archaeological evidence unearthed at Khirbet Qeiyafa, the inscription's reference to a "king of the house of David" constitutes primary evidence that David was a historical figure and the founder of a centralized Iron Age II dynasty.

== See also ==
- Historicity of David
- List of artifacts significant to the Bible
