= Iphtahel =

Coordinates: 32.832774°N 35.277225°E

Iphtahel, also known as the Valley of Iphtahel, is a Biblical Valley in Nazareth, Israel.
