= Did God Have a Wife? =

2005 book by William G. Dever

Did God Have a Wife?: Archaeology and Folk Religion in Ancient Israel
- Author: William G. Dever
- Subject: Israeli history
- Publisher: Eerdmans
- Publication date: 2008
- ISBN: 0-8028-2852-3
- OCLC: 815877841
- Preceded by: Who Were the Early Israelites and Where Did They Come from?
- Followed by: The Lives of Ordinary People in Ancient Israel: Where Archaeology and the Bible Intersect

Did God Have a Wife?: Archaeology and Folk Religion in Ancient Israel (Eerdmans, ISBN 0-8028-2852-3, 2005) is a book by Syro-Palestinian archaeologist William G. Dever, Professor Emeritus of Near Eastern Archeology and Anthropology at the University of Arizona. Did God Have a Wife? was intended as a popular work making available to the general public the evidence long known to Biblical archaeologists regarding ancient Israelite religion: namely that the Israelite God of antiquity (before 600 BCE), Yahweh, had a consort, that her name was Asherah, and that she was part of the Canaanite pantheon.

== Asherah ==
In the Canaanite Pantheon, there were three great goddesses and Asherah was one of them, along with Astarte and Anath. Asherah's primary role in the Canaanite religion was that of the Mother Goddess. Asherah was associated with sacred trees, which was repeated over thirty times in the Bible, as well as in both Canaanite and Israelite religions. It is said that people who worshiped Asharah were mainly women and they considered it to be a cult.

== Summary ==
The book has nine chapters, plus an afterword and a list of sources. Chapters 1 to 3 define the topic and describe the different scholarly approaches to Israelite religion, biblical and non-biblical sources and texts, and the role of Biblical archaeology. Chapter 4, "The Hebrew Bible: Religious Reality or Theological Ideal?" examines cultic terminology and activities in the Hebrew Bible. The core of the book lies in chapters 5, "Archaeological Evidence for Folk Religions in Ancient Israel", 6 "The Goddess Asherah and Her Cult", and 7 "Asherah, Women's Cults, and 'Official Yahwism'". These chapters describe polytheistic religion in ancient Israel, which, Dever points out, was the reality in the religious lives of most people. The last two chapters (chapter 8: "From Polytheism to Monotheism" and chapter 9: "What Does the Goddess Do to Help") sum up the book, concluding that biblical monotheism is an artificial phenomenon, the product of the elite, nationalist parties who wrote and edited the Hebrew Bible during the Babylonian exile as a response to the trauma of the conquest, and subsequently enforced it in their homeland during the early Persian period. Dever also notes that folk religion and the role of the goddess did not disappear under official monotheistic Yahwism, but instead went underground, to find a home in the magic and mysticism of later Judaism.

== Criticism ==
In his book, William Dever describes archaeological findings in ancient Israel that have produced female figurines, representing female goddesses. Dever, claiming that the biblical authors never refer or allude to such archaeological facts of contemporary life, writes that the biblical authors “did not wish to acknowledge the popularity and the powerful influence of these images" (pg. 184). Benjamin D. Sommer has criticized Dever on this point, saying that "[i]n fact, however, biblical authors constantly acknowledge the widespread polytheism of Israelites, and they mention Israelite goddess worship specifically on a number of occasions (e.g., Book of Jeremiah 7.18, 44.17–19)".

Therefore, Sommer argues that the biblical authors were commonly involved in self-criticism of their nation’s polytheistic tendencies, from the period of Moses in the wilderness (Book of Exodus 32:4) to the monarchies of Israel and Judah (First Book of Kings 11:5, Second Book of Kings 23:13, Book of Ezekiel 8) and their writings in fact reflect a widespread polytheism in their own day. Even Solomon is reported to have worshipped other gods toward the end of his kingdom.

Sommer further points out that while Dever identifies female figurines holding a circular object from the 7th century BC as a representation of a goddess, other archaeologists as well as Sommer himself favor identifying the figurines as female participants of a cult and not a deity.

Francesca Stavrakopoulou has criticized Dever's use of the term 'folk religion', which, she argues, "ultimately endorses the old stereotype of 'popular' or 'folk' religion as the simplistic practices of rural communities", so perpetuating existing "derogatory assumptions" that more recent discourses on the topic have sought to counter.

== See also ==
- Henotheism
- Monolatrism
- Ninlil
