= Who Were the Early Israelites and Where Did They Come from? =

2003 book by William G. Dever

- Author: William G. Dever
- Subject: Israelite highland settlement
- Publisher: Eerdmans
- Publication date: 2003
- ISBN: 0-8028-0975-8
- Dewey Decimal: 221.95
- LC Class: DS115.5
- Preceded by: What Did the Biblical Writers Know and When Did They Know It?
- Followed by: Did God Have a Wife?

Who Were the Early Israelites and Where Did They Come From? is a 2003 book by American biblical scholar and archaeologist William G. Dever.

Dever has been prominent in the debate between biblical "maximalists" and "minimalists" over the historicity of the Bible (specifically the Old Testament). This book, which coincided with Dever's retirement from the University of Arizona, where he served as professor of Near Eastern Archaeology and Anthropology for many years, was written on a semi-popular level to explain the background and origin of the people Dever describes as the "proto-Israelites". It followed an earlier book, What Did the Biblical Writers Know and When Did They Know It?, in which Dever, contrary to the "minimalists", asserted that the writers of the Old Testament knew a good deal about the Israelites' past.

== Reception and reviews ==
Evangelical scholar Richard Hess praised Dever for his defence of the historicity of the Bible from the Book of Judges onward and for rejecting Israel Finkelstein's Low Chronology theories, but criticized him for his denial of the historical value of the Pentateuch and the Book of Joshua. Despite this, Hess stated that readers "will benefit by the critiques of various scholarly positions and by Dever's unique interpretation of the archaeological evidence".
