= William G. Dever =

American archaeologist and Bible scholar (born 1933)

- Born: William Gwinn Dever; November 27, 1933 (age 92); Louisville, Kentucky, U.S.

Academic work
- Discipline: Archaeology
- Sub-discipline: Ancient Near East; Near Eastern archaeology; Syro-Palestinian archaeology; Biblical archaeology; history of ancient Israel and Judah; historicity of the Bible
- Institutions: University of Arizona; Lycoming College

William Gwinn Dever (born November 27, 1933, Louisville, Kentucky) is an American archaeologist, Biblical scholar, historian, semiticist, and theologian. He is an active scholar of the Old Testament, and historian, specialized in the history of the Ancient Near East and the ancient kingdoms of Israel and Judah in biblical times. He was Professor of Near Eastern Archaeology and Anthropology at the University of Arizona in Tucson from 1975 to 2002. He is a Distinguished Professor of Near Eastern Archaeology at Lycoming College in Pennsylvania.

== Education ==
Dever earned his B.A. from Milligan College in 1955, an M.A. from Butler University in 1959, and a B.D. from the Christian Theological Seminary in 1959. He received his PhD from Harvard University in 1966. He describes himself as "an unreconstructed traditionalist by temperament and training."

== Career ==
=== Excavations ===
Dever was director of the Harvard Semitic Museum–Hebrew Union College excavations at Gezer in 1966–1971, 1984, and 1990; director of the dig at Khirbet el-Kôm and Jebel Qa^{c}aqir (West Bank) 1967–1971; principal investigator at Tell el-Hayyat excavations (Jordan) 1981–1985, and assistant director, University of Arizona Expedition to Idalion, Cyprus, 1991, among other excavations.

=== Topics ===
He used his background in Near Eastern field archaeology to argue, in Did God Have a Wife? Archaeology and Folk Religion in Ancient Israel (2005), for the persistence of the veneration of Asherah in the everyday religion of "ordinary people" in ancient Israel and Judah. Discussing extensive archaeological evidence from a range of Israelite sites, largely dated between the 12th and the 8th centuries BCE, Dever argued that this folk religion, with its local altars and cultic objects, amulets and votive offerings, was representative of the outlook of the majority of the population, and that the Jerusalem-centred "book religion" of the Deuteronomist circle set out in the Hebrew Bible was only ever the preserve of an elite, a "largely impractical" religious ideal.

Dever's views on the worship of Asherah are based to a significant extent on inscriptions at Khirbet el-Qom and Kuntillet Ajrud (though see also his discussion of the significance of a cultic stand from Taanach), as well as thousands of Asherah figurines that archaeologists have found in various Israel locations, including a dump near the First Temple (a dump he attributes to Josiah's iconoclastic reform efforts). His views on worship of the goddess as expressed in this book have been criticised by some. On his methodological approach more generally, Francesca Stavrakopoulou has suggested that his use of the term "folk religion" "ultimately endorses the old stereotype of 'popular' or 'folk' religion as the simplistic practices of rural communities", so perpetuating existing "derogatory assumptions" that more recent discourses on the topic have sought to counter. Others, however, praise Dever's contributions to understanding the history of Israel and Judah in the Iron Age.

=== On the historicity of the Bible ===
In retirement, Dever has become a frequent author on questions relating to the historicity of the Bible, criticizing many scholars who deny any historical value to the biblical accounts. However he is far from being a supporter of biblical literalism either. Instead he has written:

I am not reading the Bible as Scripture… I am in fact not even a theist. My view all along—and especially in the recent books—is first that the biblical narratives are indeed 'stories,' often fictional and almost always propagandistic, but that here and there they contain some valid historical information. That hardly makes me a 'maximalist.'

and

Archaeology as it is practiced today must be able to challenge, as well as confirm, the Bible stories. Some things described there really did happen, but others did not. The Biblical narratives about Abraham, Moses, Joshua and Solomon probably reflect some historical memories of people and places, but the 'larger than life' portraits of the Bible are unrealistic and contradicted by the archaeological evidence.

However, Dever is also clear that his historical field should be seen on a much broader canvas than merely how it relates to the Bible:

The most naïve misconception about Syro-Palestinian archaeology is that the rationale and purpose of 'biblical archaeology' (and, by extrapolation, Syro-Palestinian archaeology) is simply to elucidate the Bible, or the lands of the Bible

Because of these positions, Dever can be considered a centrist in the biblical field: while he is far more skeptical on the historicity of the Bible than biblical maximalists (whom he often accuses of fundamentalism), he is also vigorously critical of biblical minimalists like Philip R. Davies, Thomas L. Thompson and Niels Peter Lemche (whom he accuses of postmodernism and nihilism).

In his books Who Were the Early Israelites and Where Did They Come From? and Has Archeology Buried the Bible? Dever denies the historicity of much of the Pentateuch (while admitting that its content may contain some historical kernels) and the Book of Joshua, but states that historical materials can be found from the Book of Judges and onwards.

=== At Lycoming College (since 2008) ===
Dever joined the faculty at Lycoming College in autumn 2008. He was appointed Distinguished Professor of Near Eastern Archaeology.

== Criticism ==
Dever's views have been criticized by some of his fellow scholars, both on the minimalist and maximalist field. Minimalist scholar Philip R. Davies, who is often criticized by Dever in the book, chided his inability to distance himself from his obsessions:

"[Dever's] agendas are that (a) a coordinated team of 'minimalists'/'revisionist' biblical historians are conspiring to deny the existence of ancient Israel (and even of historical 'facts' at all!); (b) Dever has been, and remains, the guardian of truth in matters archaeological; and (c) archaeology can confirm the reliability of Biblical history. The first two of these issues obscure the central thesis."

Peter James was critical of Dever, accusing him of dismissing contrary evidence without argument and failing to engage with detail as against wider cultural context:

"If Dever's attempts to link narrative biblical history and archaeology represent mainstream thinking (as he claims), then the field is indeed in deep trouble. It is the kind of blind acceptance of traditional (unsubstantiated) 'synchronisms' espoused by Dever that has provided the very fuel for the minimalists’ criticisms. In short, Dever may prove to be his own worst enemy."

Maximalist scholar Kenneth Kitchen criticized Dever for not supporting the historicity of the Pentateuch and of the Book of Joshua, but praised him for his defence of the Bible from the Book of Judges onward:

"In his What Did the Biblical Writers Know and When Did They Know It?, we have a robust and very valuable reply to minimalists, ruthlessly exposing their suspect agendas and sham "scholarship", following on from his refutations of Finkelstein's archaeological revisionism. It should be read and appreciated (from the period 1200 B.C. onward) for his firsthand contribution on the archaeological aspects, as well in conjunction with this book. There is much solid rock here, and all of us may rejoice in that fact. To one's sorrow there is also sinking sand".

Dever also has a long and bitter feud with fellow archaeologist Israel Finkelstein, whom he has described as "idiosyncratic and doctrinaire" and "a magician and a showman", to which Finkelstein answered by calling Dever "a jealous academic parasite" and "a biblical literalist disguised as a liberal". A 2004 debate between Finkelstein and William G. Dever, mediated by Hershel Shanks (then-editor of the Biblical Archaeology Review), quickly degenerated into insults, forcing Shanks to halt the debate. Shanks described the exchange between the two as "embarrassing".

== Video lectures ==
- A 2013 lecture by Dever on the Exodus is available on YouTube. He argues for existence of a historical Israel in the Iron Age, contrary to "revisionists" and "minimalists" such as Niels Peter Lemche. He concludes, however, in this lecture that in the much greater part the Exodus is a myth or "pseudo-history," and that the early Israelites were mostly indigenous Canaanites, while stating that a group of a few thousand migrants from Egypt probably joined Israel in the 13th century BCE or later.
- A 2013 lecture by Dever on whether God had a wife (Asherah) is available on YouTube. In this lecture, he characterizes the Bible as a selective version of Israelite religion told by a right-wing clique of elites, and he argues that the majority of ordinary people were not monotheistic Yahwists and they venerated the "Great Goddess Asherah." He concludes by equating Asherah with the Shekhinah in subsequent Judaism.
- A similar 2014 lecture by Dever at Emory is available on YouTube.

== Personal life ==
Dever is the son of an evangelical pastor, was raised as an evangelical Christian, and became an evangelical preacher as well. He later rejected Christianity and converted to Reform Judaism, although he now identifies as a secular humanist and an irreligious non-theist. He is married to Pamela Gaber, professor of Old Testament and Judaic Studies at Lycoming College.

== Publications ==
- Recent archaeological discoveries and biblical research. University of Washington Press. 1990. ISBN 978-0295965888.
- What Did the Biblical Writers Know and When Did They Know It? What Archaeology Can Tell Us about the Reality of Ancient Israel. William B. Eerdmans Publishing Company. 2001. ISBN 0-8028-4794-3.
- Who Were the Early Israelites and Where Did They Come From?. William B. Eerdmans Publishing Company. 2003. ISBN 0-8028-0975-8.
- Did God Have a Wife?: Archaeology and Folk Religion in Ancient Israel. William B. Eerdmans Publishing Company. 2005. ISBN 0-8028-2852-3.
- The Lives of Ordinary People in Ancient Israel: Where Archaeology and the Bible Intersect. William B. Eerdmans Publishing Company. 2012. ISBN 978-0-8028-6701-8.
- Beyond the Texts: An Archaeological Portrait of Ancient Israel and Judah. SBL Press. 2017. ASIN B076FRSWSC.
- Has Archaeology Buried the Bible?. William B. Eerdmans Publishing Company. 2020. ASIN B089LY4LBP.
- My Nine Lives: Sixty Years in Israeli and Biblical Archaeology. SBL Press. 2020. ASIN B08P3V94PT.
