= Philip R. Davies =

British Biblical scholar (1945–2018)

Philip R. Davies (1945–2018) was a British biblical scholar. He was Professor Emeritus of biblical studies at the University of Sheffield, England. In the late 1990s, he was the Director for the Centre for the Study of the Dead Sea Scrolls. He was also the publisher and editorial director of Sheffield Academic Press. He was the author of books and articles on ancient Israelite history and religion, including Scribes and Schools (1998) in the Library of Ancient Israel. Davies promoted the theory of cultural memory. He and David Clines edited the Journal for the Study of the Old Testament and its Supplement Series.

Davies was a part of the Copenhagen School, along with Niels Peter Lemche, Keith Whitelam, and Thomas L. Thompson. They were dubbed biblical minimalists by colleagues with different opinions from theirs, a loosely knit group of scholars who hold that the Bible is a composite work, and that those books in the Hebrew Bible which narrate the history of the ancient Israelites should be viewed first and foremost as literature, as the invention of postexilic scribes who sought to unify the postexilic Jerusalemite community by creating a past for it. This group of biblical scholars suggest that all characters and events in these stories of Israel's past should be viewed with skepticism unless they are corroborated by epigraphic or archaeological evidence.

== Christ myth debate ==
In 2012, Davies weighed in on the Christ myth theory debate in the article Does Jesus Exist? at bibleinterp.com. He applauded the book Is This Not the Carpenter?: The Question of the Historicity of the Figure of Jesus edited by Thomas L. Thompson writing "the rather fragile historical evidence for Jesus of Nazareth should be tested to see what weight it can bear," criticizing scholars like Bart D. Ehrman who write with near certainty about Jesus' existence, and concluding "I don’t think, however, that in another 20 years there will be a consensus that Jesus did not exist, or even possibly didn’t exist, but a recognition that his existence is not entirely certain would nudge Jesus scholarship towards academic respectability."

== Notable works ==
- 1QM: the War Scroll from Qumran: Its Structure and History (Rome: Biblical Institute Press, 1977)
- The Damascus Document (Sheffield: JSOT Press, 1982) ISBN 0-905774-51-5
- Cities of the Biblical World: Qumran (Cambridge: Lutterworth, 1982)
- Daniel (Sheffield: JSOT Press, 1985)
- Scribes and Schools (Westminster John Knox, 1998) ISBN 0-664-22728-7
- In Search Of "Ancient Israel" (London and New York: T. & T. Clark Publishers, Ltd. 1992) ISBN 0-567-08099-4
- The Complete World of the Dead Sea Scrolls, written with George J. Brooke, Phillip R. Callaway (London: Thames & Hudson, June 2002) ISBN 0-500-05111-9
- Whose Bible Is It Anyway? (London and New York: T. & T. Clark Publishers, Ltd. 2004) ISBN 0-567-08073-0
- Far From Minimal: Celebrating the Work and Influence of Philip R. Davies, edited by Duncan Burns and J. W. Rogerson (London and New York: T&T Clark International, 2012) ISBN 978-0-567-02717-7
