= The Historicity of the Patriarchal Narratives =

Book by Thomas L. Thompson

The Historicity of the Patriarchal Narratives: The Quest for the Historical Abraham
- Edition from 2002 by Trinity Press International
- Author: Thomas L. Thompson
- Language: English
- Publisher: Walter de Gruyter
- Publication date: 1974
- Publication place: United States
- Media type: Print (Hardcover)

The Historicity of the Patriarchal Narratives: The Quest for the Historical Abraham is a book by biblical scholar Thomas L. Thompson, Professor of Old Testament Studies at the University of Copenhagen.

Together with John Van Seters's Abraham in History and Tradition (1975), this book marked the culmination of a growing current of dissatisfaction in scholarly circles with the then-current consensus (or near-consensus) on the patriarchal narratives. The consensus can be summarized as the proposal that, even if archaeology could not directly confirm the existence of the patriarchs (Abraham, Isaac and Jacob), these patriarchal narratives had originated in a second millennium BC setting because many personal names, place names, and customs referenced in the Genesis narratives were unique to that era. This view was expressed by John Bright in his influential History of Israel (1959, 2nd edition 1960) in these words; "one is forced to the conclusion that the patriarchal narratives authentically reflect social customs at home in the second millennium rather than those of later Israel".

Thompson points out that, in fact, none of the archaeological evidence cited by the dominant scholars of the time (notably William F. Albright, E. A. Speiser, Cyrus Gordon, and Bright himself) actually provided irrefutable proof for the historicity of the patriarchal narratives, arguing that "not only has archaeology not proven a single event of the patriarchal traditions to be historical, it has not shown any of the traditions to be likely." He therefore concludes that "the quest for the historical Abraham is a basically fruitless occupation both for the historian and the student of the Bible."

Albright's reputation never quite recovered from the publication of Thompson's book.

== See also ==
- The Copenhagen School (theology)
