= John Bright (biblical scholar) =

American biblical scholar (1908–1995)

The Reverend John Bright
- Born: September 25, 1908; Chattanooga, Tennessee, US
- Died: March 26, 1995 (aged 86); Richmond, Virginia, US
- Spouse: Carrie Bright (died 1985)

Ecclesiastical career
- Religion: Christianity (Presbyterian)
- Church: Presbyterian Church in the United States
- Ordained: 1935

Academic background
- Education: Presbyterian College; Union Theological Seminary in Virginia; Johns Hopkins University
- Thesis: The Age of King David (1940)
- Academic advisor: William F. Albright

Academic work
- Discipline: Biblical studies
- Sub-discipline: Old Testament studies
- School or tradition: Biblical archaeology
- Institutions: Union Theological Seminary in Virginia
- Notable students: Graeme Goldsworthy; Richard D. Nelson
- Notable works: A History of Israel (1959)

John Bright (1908–1995) was an American biblical scholar and the author of several books, including the influential A History of Israel (1959), a fourth edition of which was published in 2000. He was closely associated with the American school of biblical criticism pioneered by William F. Albright, which sought to marry archaeology to a defense of the reliability of the Bible, especially the earlier books of the Old Testament.

== Biography ==
Born on September 25, 1908, in Chattanooga, Tennessee, John Bright was raised in the Presbyterian Church US, and attended Presbyterian College, where he earned his Bachelor of Arts degree in 1928. He received a Bachelor of Divinity degree from Union Theological Seminary (now Union Presbyterian Seminary) in Virginia in 1931, followed by a Master of Theology degree in 1933. His master's thesis was titled A Psychological Study of the Major Prophets. In the winter of 1931–32, Bright participated in an archaeological campaign at Tell Beit Mirsim, where he met William Foxwell Albright of Johns Hopkins University, who became his mentor. He also participated in a dig at Bethel in 1935. In the autumn of that year he studied under Albright at Johns Hopkins University but dropped out later due to insufficient funds to continue his studies; he then briefly occupied a position as the assistant pastor of First Presbyterian Church in Durham, North Carolina. He was able to resume his studies at Johns Hopkins while pastor of Catonsville Presbyterian Church in Baltimore, and completed his doctoral degree in 1940. His dissertation was titled The Age of King David: A Study in the Institutional History of Israel. He then went back to Union Theological Seminary, where he was appointed to the Cyrus H. McCormick Chair of Hebrew and Old Testament Interpretation, a position he held until his retirement in 1975. He died in Richmond, Virginia, on March 26, 1995.

== Influence and legacy ==
Bright's work A History of Israel was published in 1959, with a second and third edition in 1972 and 1981. The second edition (1972) included new information from the Adad-nirari III stele of Tell al-Rimah, published in 1968, and the Hebrew ostracon found at Mesad Hashavyahu, published in 1962. His third edition (1981) included a thorough revision of the first four chapters. While including new data, Bright maintained his theological conviction that "the heart of Israel's faith lies in its covenantal relationship with YHWH."

In an appendix to the fourth edition (2000) of Bright's work, William P. Brown outlined some of the changes in the field of historical research since the third edition. Brown notes:

It should be pointed out that the driving force behind John Bright's scholarship was his desire to disseminate to the church and general public the fruits of biblical scholarship. In an interview held soon after the publication of the third edition of his textbook, Bright comments on identifying an "outstanding motif" in his work: "those of us who have gone more deeply into the subject have a duty to communicate to the church in a usable form what we know—and to the general public if they are interested" (Kendig B. Cully, "Interview with John Bright: Scholar of the Kingdom" [The Review of Books and Religion, 11/4 (1983), p.4].

== Published works ==
- The Age of King David: A Study in the Institutional History of Israel (doctoral dissertation 1940) (Union Seminary Review, 53 [1942] pp. 87–109).
- The Kingdom of God: The Biblical Concept and Its Meaning for the Church (New York/Nashville: Abingdon-Cokesbury, 1953)
- Early Israel in Recent History Writing (Westminster, 1956)
- A History of Israel (Westminster, 1959)
- Jeremiah: A Commentary (Anchor Bible 21: Garden City, New York: Doubleday, 1965).
- The Authority of the Old Testament (Baker, 1975)
- Covenant and Promise: The Prophetic Understanding of the Future in Pre-Exilic Israel (Philadelphia: Westminster, 1976).

== See also ==
- Biblical archaeology
