= Scandinavian Journal of the Old Testament =

- Discipline: Biblical studies
- Language: English
- Edited by: Ingrid Hjelm and Emanuel Pfoh

Publication details
- History: 1985-present
- Publisher: Taylor & Francis
- Frequency: Biannual

Standard abbreviations
- ISO 4: Scand. J. Old Testam.

Indexing
- ISSN: 0901-8328 (print); 1502-7244 (web)
- LCCN: sn88021685
- OCLC no.: 16313081

Links
- Journal homepage; Online access; Online archive

The Scandinavian Journal of the Old Testament is a biannual peer-reviewed academic journal covering aspects of the Hebrew Bible. It was established by Niels Peter Lemche (University of Copenhagen) and Knud Jeppesen. As per 2024, Ingrid Hjelm and Emanuel Pfoh are editors-in-chief.
