= Tremper Longman =

American scholar, theologian, and academic (born 1952)

Tremper Longman III
- Born: Tremper Longman; September 8, 1952 (age 74); Princeton, NJ
- Occupations: Old Testament scholar, theologian, professor
- Title: Robert H. Gundry Professor of Biblical Studies at Westmont College
- Spouse: Alice
- Children: 3 sons
- Awards: 2009 ECPA Christian Book Award winner

Academic background
- Education: Ohio Wesleyan University; Westminster Theological Seminary; Yale University

Academic work
- Discipline: Biblical studies
- Sub-discipline: Old Testament studies
- Institutions: Westminster Theological Seminary; Westmont College
- Notable works: The Book of Ecclesiastes (NICOT); The Song of Solomon (NICOT); Daniel (NIVAC); Proverbs (BCOT-WP); Job (BCOT-WP); Psalms (TOTC); Dictionary of the Old Testament: Wisdom, Poetry & Writings

Tremper Longman III (born 8 September 1952) is an Old Testament scholar, theologian, professor and author of several books, including 2009 ECPA Christian Book Award winner Dictionary of the Old Testament: Wisdom, Poetry & Writings.

== Early life and education ==
Longman was born on September 8, 1952, in Princeton, New Jersey. His parents were Tremper Longman Jr. and Mary Jane Longman (née Stevenson).

He earned his B.A. from Ohio Wesleyan University, his M.Div. from Westminster Theological Seminary, and his M.Phil. and Ph.D. in Old Testament and Ancient Near Eastern studies from Yale University.

== Career ==
Longman is Distinguished Scholar of Biblical Studies and emeritus Professor of Biblical Studies at Westmont College in Santa Barbara, California, where he was the Robert H. Gundry Professor of Biblical Studies for nineteen years before his retirement in 2017.

Prior to joining Westmont in 1998, Longman taught for eighteen years at Westminster Theological Seminary in Philadelphia. He has also served as visiting professor at The Seattle School of Theology and Psychology, an adjunct professor at Fuller Theological Seminary, and a guest lecturer at Regent College and the Canadian Theological Seminary.

Longman has contributed to a number of commentaries, including the New International Commentary on the Old Testament (The Song of Solomon and Ecclesiastes), NIV Application Commentary (Daniel), New International Biblical Commentary (Jeremiah and Lamentations), and the Baker Old Testament Wisdom series (Proverbs). In addition, he was the senior translator for the wisdom books on the central committee that produced and now monitors the New Living Translation.

== Personal life ==
He is married to Alice Longman and has three sons. He lives in Alexandria, Virginia.

== Selected publications ==
- Longman III, Tremper (1988). How to Read the Psalms. Downers Grove: IVP Academic. ISBN 0-87784-941-2.
- ——— (1991). Fictional Akkadian Autobiography: A Generic and Comparative Study. Winona Lake: Eisenbrauns. ISBN 0-931464-41-2.
- ———; Ryken, Leland (1993). The Complete Literary Guide to the Bible. Grand Rapids: Zondervan. ISBN 0-310-23078-0.
- ———; Dillard, Raymond B. (1994). An Introduction to the Old Testament. Grand Rapids: Zondervan. ISBN 0-310-43250-2.
- ———; Reid, Daniel (1995). God is a Warrior. Grand Rapids: Zondervan. ISBN 0-310-49461-3.
- ——— (1997). The Book of Ecclesiastes. New International Commentary on the Old Testament. Grand Rapids: Eerdmans. ISBN 0-8028-2366-1.
- ——— (1997). Reading the Bible with Heart and Mind. Colorado Springs: NavPress. ISBN 0-8910-9-984-0.
- ———; Ryken, Leland (1998). Dictionary of Biblical Imagery. Downers Grove: IVP Academic. ISBN 0-8308-1451-5.
- ——— (1999). Daniel. NIV Application Commentary. Grand Rapids: Zondervan. ISBN 978-0-3102-0608-8.
- ——— (2001). The Song of Solomon. New International Commentary on the Old Testament. Grand Rapids: Eerdmans. ISBN 978-0-8028-2543-8.
- ———; Provan, Iain William; Long, V. Philips (2003). A Biblical History of Israel. Louisville: Westminster/John Knox Press. ISBN 0-664-22090-8.
- ——— (2006). Proverbs. Baker Commentary on the Old Testament Wisdom & Psalms. Grand Rapids: Baker Academic. ISBN 978-0-801-02692-8.
- ———; Enns, Peter (2008). Dictionary of the Old Testament: Wisdom, Poetry & Writings. The IVP Bible Dictionary Series. Downers Grove: IVP Academic. ISBN 978-0-8308-1783-2.
- ——— (2012). Job. Baker Commentary on the Old Testament Wisdom & Psalms. Grand Rapids: Baker Academic. ISBN 978-0-801-03107-6.
- ——— (2012). Jeremiah, Lamentations. Understanding the Bible Commentary. Grand Rapids: Baker Academic. ISBN 978-0-801-04695-7. - originally published in 2008 as part of the 'New International Biblical Commentary'
- ——— (2013). Old Testament Commentary Survey, 5th Edition. Grand Rapids: Baker Academic. ISBN 978-0-8010-3991-1.
- ——— (2014). Psalms: An Introduction and Survey. Tyndale Old Testament Commentaries. Vol. 15–16 (2nd ed.). Downers Grove, IL: IVP Academic. ISBN 978-1-783-59163-3.
- ——— (2014). The Baker Compact Bible Dictionary. Grand Rapids: Baker Books. ISBN 978-0-8010-1544-1.
- ——— (2017). The Fear of the Lord Is Wisdom: A Theological Introduction to Wisdom in Israel. Grand Rapids: Baker Academic. ISBN 978-0-801-02711-6.
- ———; Walton, John H. (2018). The Lost World of the Flood: Mythology, Theology, and the Deluge Debate. Downers Grove, IL: IVP Academic. ISBN 978-0-830-85200-0.
- ——— (2019). Confronting Old Testament Controversies: Pressing Questions about Evolution, Sexuality, History, and Violence. Grand Rapids: Baker Books. ISBN 978-0-8010-1911-1.
- ——— (2020). The Bible and the Ballot: Using Scripture in Political Decisions. Grand Rapids: William B. Eerdmans Publishing Co. ISBN 978-0-8028-7734-5.
- ——— (2020). How to Read Daniel. Downers Grove, IL: IVP Academic. ISBN 9780830853212.
- ——— (2022). Revelation Through Old Testament Eyes. Grand Rapids: Kregel Publications. ISBN 9780825444739.
- ——— (2024). The Old Testament as Literature: Foundations for Christian Interpretation. Grand Rapids: Baker Academic. ISBN 9781540961310.
- ——— (2025). How to Read Genesis (2nd ed.). Downers Grove, IL: IVP Academic. ISBN 9781514002841.
