= V. Philips Long =

American Old Testament scholar

- Title: Professor of Old Testament at Regent College

Academic background
- Education: Wheaton College, Gordon-Conwell Theological Seminary
- Alma mater: University of Cambridge (PhD)

Academic work
- Institutions: Covenant Theological Seminary (St. Louis, Missouri); Regent College
- Notable works: The Art of Biblical History (1994)

V. Philips Long, also known as Phil Long, is an American Old Testament scholar.

Long has degrees from Wheaton College, Gordon-Conwell Theological Seminary, and the University of Cambridge. He taught at Covenant Theological Seminary and the Freie Theologische Akademie in Germany before becoming Professor of Old Testament at Regent College.

Long served on the translation teams for the ESV and NLT. He is an ordained teaching elder in the Presbyterian Church in America.

Long specializes in study relating to the historicity of the Bible. According to C. Hassell Bullock, Long's 1994 book The Art of Biblical History "represents a long stride in the direction of open and honest grappling" with the issues of biblical history.

== Works ==
=== Books ===
- Long, V. Philips (1989). The Reign and Rejection of King Saul: a case for literary and theological coherence. Dissertation series (Society of Biblical Literature). Vol. 118. Atlanta, GA: Scholars Press. ISBN 978-1-555-40391-1. OCLC 20093796.
- ——— (1992). Hebrew Power Pills. St. Louis, MO: V. P. Long. OCLC 42743673.
- ——— (1994). The Art of Biblical History. Foundations of contemporary interpretation. Vol. 5. Grand Rapids, MI: Zondervan. ISBN 978-0-310-43180-0. OCLC 29427793.
- ——— (1996). "The Art of Biblical History". In Silva, Moisés (ed.). Foundations of contemporary interpretation. Grand Rapids, MI: Zondervan. ISBN 978-0-310-20828-0. OCLC 34515023.
- ——— (1999). Israel's past in present research : essays on ancient Israelite historiography. Sources for biblical and theological study. Vol. 7. Winona Lake, IN: Eisenbrauns. ISBN 978-1-5750-6028-6. OCLC 42290498.
- ———; Wenham, Gordon J.; Baker, David W., eds. (2002). Windows into Old Testament History: evidence, argument, and the crisis of "Biblical Israel". Grand Rapids, MI: Eerdmans. ISBN 978-0-802-83962-6. OCLC 49226243.
- ———; Longman III, Tremper; Provan, Iain W. (2003). A Biblical History of Israel. Louisville, KY: Westminster, John Knox Press. ISBN 978-0-6642-2090-7. OCLC 52055642.
