= Abraham in History and Tradition =

Book by John Van Seters

- Author: John Van Seters
- Language: English
- Publisher: Yale University Press
- Publication date: 1975
- Publication place: United States
- Media type: Print (Hardcover)
- ISBN: 978-0-300-04040-1

This article presents information about the John Van Seters book; for general information about the topic, see Abraham: Historicity and origins and The Bible and history.

Abraham in History and Tradition is a 1975 book by biblical scholar John Van Seters.

The book is divided into two parts, Abraham in History and Abraham in Tradition. In Part I, Van Seters argues that there is no unambiguous evidence pointing to an origin for the stories in the 2nd millennium BC. "Arguments based on reconstructing the patriarch's nomadic way of life, the personal names in Genesis, the social customs reflected in the stories, and correlation of the traditions of Genesis with the archaeological data of the Middle Bronze Age have all been found, in Part One above, to be quite defective in demonstrating an origin for the Abraham tradition in the second millennium B.C.". This finding has implications for certain then-current strands in Biblical criticism: "Consequently, without any such effective historical controls on the tradition one cannot use any part of it in an attempt to reconstruct the primitive period of Israelite history. Furthermore, a vague presupposition about the antiquity of the tradition based upon a consensus approval of such arguments should no longer be used as a warrant for proposing a history of the tradition related to early premonarchic times."

Part II forms a critique of "tradition-history" or "tradition-analysis", the theory current at the time that Genesis retained traces of oral traditions dating from the 2nd millennium. "There is virtually no way of deciding when oral narrative forms or motifs became associated with a particular person such as Abraham, and it could well have happened in every case when the story was first put in written form. The results of the literary examination of the Abraham tradition, in Part Two, would suggest that oral forms and motifs are confined to a rather small part of the tradition."

== Impact ==
=== On "Biblical archaeology" and the Albright school ===
The book was a paradigm shift in Near Eastern Studies and Biblical archaeology, since it challenged the dominant view, popularised by William Foxwell Albright, that the patriarchal narratives of Genesis can be identified on archaeological grounds with the Mesopotamian world of 2nd millennium BC. Van Seters noted that many of Albright's parallels were vague, and fit other regions than Mesopotamia and other times than 2nd millennium. Specially severe was his analysis of Genesis 14, where he pointed out that the political situation described in Genesis 14 - a Near East dominated by a coalition led by Elam and including Hatti, Assyria and Babylonia - is not confirmed by any monuments, king lists, or other historical and archaeological sources. Van Seters also pointed out that the ten kings mentioned in Genesis 14 cannot be found in any ancient documents outside the Bible.

=== On "Tradition history" ===
The book was also a criticism of the school of Tradition history advanced most notably by Hermann Gunkel and Martin Noth: Van Seters "argues that Noth's (1948) idea of a "pentateuchal oral tradition" is flawed both historically (with respect to the history of Israel) and analogically (given Noth's comparisons with the development of Icelandic saga) [and] contends that traces of folkloric structure do not make it inevitable 'that the tradition as a whole, or even [certain] parts of it, derive from a pre-literate period'". Van Seters instead proposed that Genesis was an essentially literary work, but one based on a process of supplementation by successive authors rather on a redactorial process (i.e., on the combination of separate documents by an editor or editors). This in turn amounted to a major challenge to the Documentary Hypothesis, the dominant theory concerning the origins of the Pentateuch.

=== On the "documentary hypothesis" and the formation of the Torah ===
At the time Van Seters published "Abraham in History and Tradition" the dominant scholarly theory regarding the composition of the Pentateuch was the Documentary Hypothesis. This held that the books of the Torah, including the Genesis accounts of Abraham and the Patriarchs, were based on four independent sources. Each of these was originally a complete document in itself, dating from between the 10th and 7th centuries BC and combined into the final work by a Redactor (editor) in the Persian period, c.450 BC. Van Seters retained the idea of source documents but dropped the idea of a redactor, which meant dropping the documentary model itself. In its place he adopted a supplemental model, "a successive supplementation of one source or author by another," in which a Yahwist (not identical with Wellhausen's Yahwist) working in the period of the Babylonian exile was the major but not the final author of Genesis. Van Seter's schema is as follows:

- i. Pre-Yahwistic first stage: 12:1, 4a, 6a, 7, 10-20; 13:1-2; I6:1-3a, 4-9, IIab, 12; 13:18; 18:1a, 10-14; 21:2, 6-7 (all except the references to Lot). These represent a small unified work with three episodes and a brief framework.
- ii. Pre-Yahwistic second stage ("E"): 20:1-17; 21:25-26, 28-31a. This represents one unified story that originally came after the adventure in Egypt (13:1), to which it was added. It was subsequently transposed to its present position by the Yahwist, who added 20:iii. Ia ("From there ... Negeb") as a transition.
- Yahwist:

a. brief secondary additions to previous works: 12:2-3, 6b, c8-9; 16:7b, 10, 11c, 13-14; 20:Iaα; 21:I.
b. larger episodic units: 13:3-5, 7-17; chap. 15; 18:Ib-9, I5-19:38; 21:8-24, 27, 3Ib-34; chap. 22; chap. 24; 25:I-6, II; (chap. 26). All incorporated with some new arrangement of the materials.

- iv. Priestly:

a. secondary genealogical and chronological additions: 11:26-32; 12:4b-5; 13:6; 16:3b, 15-16; 21:3-5; 25:7-10.
b. larger episodic units: chaps. 17 and 23.

- v. Post-Priestly: chap. 14 (of which vv. 18-20 are secondary).

A celebrated scholarly argument ensued between Van Seters and Rolf Rendtorff over the role and existence of the redactors, Van Seters arguing that they did not exist, Rendtorff and his followers arguing that they were essential. Van Seters stated his position as follows:

It was the Documentary Hypothesis that created the redactor as a literary device, a deus ex machina, to make the whole theory work. That is the only really distinctive feature of the Documentary Hypothesis and it is this part of the theory that Rendtorff and others have retained. Now we supposedly have editors without any authors, which is absurd ... It is high time that the "redactor" takes his leave and the author is restored to his rightful place in literary criticism.

== See also ==
- Biblical criticism
- Biblical minimalism
- Source criticism
- Chedorlaomer
- Ipuwer Papyrus
