= Kenneth Kitchen =

British Egyptologist (1932–2025)

Kenneth Anderson Kitchen
- Born: 8 June 1932; Aberdeen, Scotland
- Died: 6 February 2025 (aged 92); Woolton, England
- Occupations: Bible scholar, archaeologist and Egyptologist
- Title: Personal and Brunner Professor Emeritus of Egyptology

Academic work
- Discipline: Egyptology
- Institutions: University of Liverpool
- Notable works: Ramesside inscriptions: Historical and biographical The Third Intermediate Period in Egypt (1100–650 BC); On the Reliability of the Old Testament

Kenneth Anderson Kitchen (8 June 1932 – 6 February 2025) was a British biblical scholar, Ancient Near Eastern historian, and Personal and Brunner Professor Emeritus of Egyptology and honorary research fellow at the School of Archaeology, Classics and Egyptology, University of Liverpool, England. He specialised in the ancient Egyptian Ramesside Period (i.e., Dynasties 19-20), and the Third Intermediate Period of Egypt, as well as ancient Egyptian chronology, having written over 250 books and journal articles on these and other subjects since the mid-1950s. He has been described by The Times as "the very architect of Egyptian chronology".

== Background ==
Kitchen was born in Aberdeen, Scotland in 1932. He died on 6 February 2025 as an unmarried bachelor.

== Third Intermediate Period ==
Kitchen's 1972 book (republished with a second edition in 1996) titled The Third Intermediate Period in Egypt (1100–650 BC), which covered the 21st through to the 25th dynasties of Egypt and contained an extensive catalogue of known dates and inscriptions as well as genealogical information for this period "remains one of the standard works on the subject" notes Egyptologist and Archaeologist James K. Hoffmeier. His book noted a hitherto unknown period of coregency between Year 49 of Psusennes I with Year X of Amenemope and another coregency between Osorkon III with his son, Takelot III. Kitchen's book also established that Osorkon I of the 22nd Dynasty likely had a reign of 35 years as Manetho states in his Epitome states since the mummy of a priest named Nakhtefmut—buried at the Ramesseum--"was adorned with leather tabs and pendant emblazoned in the name of Osorkon I, and wrapped in bandages marked Year 33 and Year 3 of unnanamed king"—where the Year 33 date could only belong to Osorkon I.

Kitchen's book stated that Takelot II succeeded Osorkon II at Tanis, whereas most Egyptologists today accept it was Shoshenq III who succeeded Osorkon II in Lower Egypt at Tanis. Secondly, the book presented King Shoshenq II as the High Priest of Amun Shoshenq C, a son of Osorkon I who predeceased his father. However, this interpretation is weakened by the fact that no objects from Shoshenq II's intact burial at Tanis bears Osorkon I's name. Finally, contra Kitchen, most Egyptologists today such as Rolf Krauss, Aidan Dodson and Jürgen von Beckerath accept David Aston's argument that the Crown Prince Osorkon B, Takelot II's son, assumed power as Osorkon III, a king of the 'Theban Twenty-Third Dynasty' in Upper Egypt.

== Ramesside period ==
Kitchen was regarded as one of the foremost scholars on the Ramesside period (1196–1070 a.C., Dynasty XIX and XX) of the New Kingdom; he published a well-respected book on Ramesses II in 1982 titled Pharaoh Triumphant: The Life and Times of Ramesses II, King of Egypt. Kitchen was a scholar who advocated a high view of the Old Testament and its inherent historicity. His 2003 book On the Reliability of the Old Testament documents several clear or indirect allusions to King David's status as the founder of Ancient Israel, based on passages in the Tel Dan ('House of David') and Mesha stelas as well as in Shoshenq I's Karnak list. It provoked two interesting scholarly reactions and a reply by Kitchen.

Kitchen strongly criticized the new chronology views of David Rohl, who posits that the Biblical Shishak who invaded the Kingdom of Judah in 925 BC was actually Ramesses II rather than Shoshenq I and argues that the 21st and 22nd Dynasties of Egypt were contemporary with one another due to the absence of Dynasty 21 Apis Bull stele in the Serapeum. Kitchen observed that the word Shishak is closer philologically to Shoshenq I and that this Pharaoh records in his monuments at Thebes that he campaigned actively against Ancient Israel and Judah.

== Biblical scholarship ==
Kitchen was a biblical maximalist and published works that are frequently defending the historicity of the Old Testament. He was an outspoken critic of the documentary hypothesis, publishing various articles and books upholding his viewpoint, arguing that the Bible is historically reliable. Kitchen also published articles for the Biblical Archaeology Review including, 'Where Did Solomon's Gold Go?' (1989), 'Shishak's Military Campaign in Israel Confirmed' (1989), 'The Patriarchal Age: Myth or History?' (1995) and 'How we know when Solomon ruled' (2001).

Kenton L. Sparks wrote "Having already shown me the earth from an orbiting spaceship, Kitchen then proceeded to argue that the earth was flat. For the first time it began to dawn on me that the critical arguments regarding the Pentateuch were far better, and carried much more explanatory power, than the flimsy broom that Kitchen was using to sweep them away."

== Bibliography ==
- 2023. Das Alte Testament und der Vordere Orient: Zur historischen Zuverlässigkeit biblischer Geschichte. 3rd edition. Gießen: Brunnen. ISBN 978-3-7655-9254-6 German revised edition of On the Reliability of the Old Testament. Grand Rapids and Cambridge: William B. Eerdmans Publishing Company. ISBN 0-8028-4960-1
- 2016. In Sunshine & Shadow. Liverpool: Abercromby Press. ISBN 9780993092046 (autobiography, including author's bibliography)
- 2012. Treaty, Law and Covenant in the Ancient Near East. 3 Volumes. Wiesbaden: Harrassowitz
- 2009. Egyptian New Kingdom Topographical Lists, in "Causing His Name to Live: Studies in Egyptian Epigraphy and History in Memory of William J. Murnane", Brill
- 2007. James K. Hoffmeier & Kenneth A. Kitchen, Reshep and Astarte in North Sinai: A Recently Discovered Stela from Tell El-Borg, Ägypten und Levante / Egypt and the Levant 17, 2007, pp. 127–136
- 2006. The strengths and weaknesses of Egyptian chronology--a Reconsideration, Ägypten und Levante / Egypt and the Levant 16, 2006, pp. 293–308
- 2006. High society and lower ranks in Ramesside Egypt at home and abroad, British Museum Studies in Ancient Egypt and Sudan (BMSAES) 6 (2006), pp. 31–36.
- 2003. On the Reliability of the Old Testament. Grand Rapids and Cambridge: William B. Eerdmans Publishing Company. ISBN 0-8028-4960-1 OT
- 2002. Ancient Egyptian Chronology for Aegeanists, MAA 2, Dec 2002
- 1999. Poetry of Ancient Egypt. Jonsered: P. Aströms förlag.
- 1994. Documentation for Ancient Arabia. Part 1: Chronological Framework and Historical Sources. The World of Ancient Arabia 1. Liverpool: Liverpool University Press
- 1991. The chronology of ancient Egypt World Archaeology, Volume 23 No.2, 1991, pp. 201–208
- 1982. Pharaoh Triumphant: The Life and Times of Ramesses II, King of Egypt. Monumenta Hannah Sheen Dedicata 2. Mississauga: Benben Publications.
- 1977. The Bible In Its World The Bible in its World: The Bible & Archaeology Today (contains accessible PDF links). Exeter: Paternoster. Downers Grove: InterVarsity Press 1978. Link to PDF Articles
- 1973. "Late-Egyptian Chronology and the Hebrew Monarchy", Journal of Ancient and Near Eastern Studies]" 5 (JANES) 5, 1973
- 1972. The Third Intermediate Period in Egypt (1100–650 BC). 1972. 2nd ed. 1996. 3rd ed. Warminster: Aris & Phillips Limited, 1998.
- 1969–1990. Ramesside Inscriptions: Historical and Biographical. 8 Vols. Oxford: B. H. Blackwell Ltd.

Vol 1 1975, Vol 2 1979, Vol 3 1980, Vol 4 1982, Vol 5 1983, Vol 7 1989, Vol 8 1990

- 1966. Ancient Orient and Old Testament (contains accessible PDF links) London: Tyndale Press. Chicago: InterVarsity Press. Link to PDF Articles
- 1962. Suppiluliuma and the Amarna Pharaohs; a study in relative chronology, Liverpool University Press
