= On the Reliability of the Old Testament =

2003 book by Kenneth Kitchen

- Author: Kenneth Kitchen
- Language: English
- Genre: Non-fiction
- Publisher: William B. Eerdmans Publishing Company
- Publication date: 2003
- ISBN: 0-8028-4960-1

On the Reliability of the Old Testament (William B. Eerdmans Publishing Company, Grand Rapids and Cambridge, 2003: ISBN 0-8028-4960-1) is a book by British Egyptologist and Biblical scholar Kenneth Kitchen (1932–2025).

The book was intended to serve as a counterpart to F. F. Bruce's Are the New Testament Documents Reliable? (1943), and in so doing to counter the arguments of Biblical minimalism, which casts doubt upon the historical value of the Old Testament.

The book opens with an introductory chapter surveying the history with which it intends to deal, the continuous narrative in the Hebrew Bible from the Genesis creation narrative to the return of the Jews to Jerusalem from the Babylonian captivity in the early days of the Persian Empire in the 5th century BC. The author claims that this history was written at the same time as the events it describes in its various sections, and that this can be confirmed by comparing the Old Testament with non-Biblical sources, both written and archaeological. He clarifies by stating that there are three elements he means to address, history, literature and culture, and three he does not, theology, doctrine, and dogma.

The core of the book is eight chapters (chapters 2 to 9) surveying Biblical history and comparing it to the ages with which it deals, from the 3rd millennium (the period to which Kitchen traces the origins of the Biblical stories of Noah's Flood and other incidents from the opening chapters of Genesis) to the Babylonian captivity and the return of the Jews to Jerusalem under the leadership of Ezra and Nehemiah. The author presents his conclusions in chapter 10.

In chapter 10, despite supporting the historicity of the Bible, Kitchen also criticizes biblical archaeology as it was conceived in the first half of the 20th century, particularly the works of William Foxwell Albright and Cyrus Herzl Gordon, whom he dismisses as "little local (and very parochial)" representatives of the "long-deceased American Biblical Archaeology/theology school".

== Reception ==
Lindsay Wilson described Kitchen's work as a landmark and stated that "[i]t is so detailed and, at times, technical that it becomes a reference book for scholars and students."

According to Mark W. Chavalas, "Kitchen is very thorough in his argumentation and documentation" but "his insulting tone will not encourage scholars to be dispassionate about evaluating his arguments. I am disappointed that such an honored and reputable scholar has resorted to such language."

John R. Huddlestun wrote "Given its subject matter, one would expect a serious treatment of the issue of historiography, along with some interaction with the relevant literature, yet here the reader is sadly disappointed. K. adopts a naive, academically discredited view of history. Both his agenda and the belligerent tone of the volume are displayed in the preface:"

Eugene H. Merrill, from the Dallas Theological Seminary, appreciated Kitchen's book, albeit having a few critical remarks, especially about dating the Exodus. He also said that minimalist academics are unlikely to read Kitchen's book.

According to Richard Ostling, the book provides the reader with "the most sweeping scholarly case in a generation for the traditional beliefs held by Orthodox Jews and Christian conservatives".

Richard Hess gave the book a positive review, applauding Kitchen's extensive research on the relevant source material and his knowledge of the contexts in which the Old Testament was written.

== See also ==
- The Making of the Pentateuch
