= Iain Provan =

British Old Testament scholar

Iain William Provan
- Born: 6 May 1957 (age 69); United Kingdom
- Title: Former Marshall Sheppard Professor of Biblical Studies at Regent College

Academic background
- Education: University of Glasgow, London Bible College
- Alma mater: University of Cambridge (PhD)
- Thesis: The David and bamot themes of the books of Kings (1986)
- Doctoral advisor: Hugh G. M. Williamson

Academic work
- Institutions: Regent College; University of Edinburgh; King's College London

Iain William Provan (born 6 May 1957) is a British Old Testament scholar, now living in Canada. He was Marshall Sheppard Professor of Biblical Studies at Regent College in Vancouver from 1997 until his retirement on 31 December 2022.

== Education ==
Provan holds degrees from the University of Glasgow, London Bible College (now London School of Theology), and the University of Cambridge. His PhD thesis at Cambridge was published as Hezekiah and the Books of Kings (BZAW 172; Berlin: De Gruyter, 1988). He previously lectured at King's College London and then, after holding a postdoctoral fellowship at the University of Wales, at the University of Edinburgh.

== Career ==
Provan has written numerous academic essays, many of the earlier of which are included in his Against the Grain: Selected Essays (ed. Stacey L. Van Dyk; Vancouver: Regent Publishing, 2015). He has also published commentaries on Lamentations, 1 and 2 Kings, and Ecclesiastes and Song of Songs, as well as co-editing (with Mark Boda) Let Us Go Up To Zion (2012), a Festschrift for his Cambridge PhD supervisor, Hugh G. M. Williamson. His other books include Convenient Myths: The Axial Age, Dark Green Religion, and the World That Never Was (2013), Discovering Genesis: Content, Interpretation, Reception (2015), The Reformation and the Right Reading of Scripture (2017), Seeking What is Right: The Old Testament and the Good Life (2020), and Cuckoos in our Nest: Truth and Lies about Being Human (2023). The 2003 co-authored volume A Biblical History of Israel (with V. Philips Long and Tremper Longman III) was the winner of the 2005 Biblical Archaeology Society prize for the best popular book on archaeology; it has now appeared in a second edition (2015). Seriously Dangerous Religion: What the Old Testament Really Says, and Why It Matters (2014) won the 2016 R. B. Y. Scott Award from the Canadian Society of Biblical Studies, recognizing an outstanding book in the areas of Hebrew Bible and/or the Ancient Near East. Provan has been awarded an Alexander von Humboldt Foundation Research Fellowship on five occasions, and (once) a Lilly Foundation Theological Research Grant. He was a visiting fellow at Clare Hall, Cambridge, in 1993, and has been a Life Member of the college since that time. He is a member of the Society for Old Testament Study, the Society of Biblical Literature, the Canadian Society of Biblical Studies, and the Humboldt Association of Canada. He is also a minister of the Church of Scotland. He is married with four adult children. His hobbies include fly-fishing.

== Works ==
=== Thesis ===
- Provan, Iain W. (1986). The David and Bamot Themes of the Books of Kings (Ph.D.). Cambridge: University of Cambridge.

=== Books ===
- Provan, Iain W. (1988). Hezekiah and the Books of Kings: A contribution to the debate about the composition of the Deuteronomistic history. Beihefte zur Zeitschrift für die alttestamentliche Wissenschaft. Vol. 172. Berlin; New York: W. de Gruyter. doi:10.1515/9783110849424. ISBN 978-0-899-25461-6. ISBN 978-3-11-011557-4
- ——— (1991). Lamentations. New Century Bible Commentary. London; Grand Rapids, MI: Marshall Pickering; Eerdmans. ISBN 978-0-551-02323-9. OCLC 23985616.
- ——— (1995). 1 and 2 Kings. New International Biblical Commentary, Old Testament series. Peabody, MA; Carlisle, Cumbria: Hendrickson Publishers; Paternoster Press. ISBN 978-1-565-63053-6. OCLC 32203288.
- ——— (1997). Ideologies, Literary and Critical: Reflections on recent writing on the history of Israel. Vancouver, BC: Regent College Publishing. ISBN 978-1-573-83094-2. OCLC 44503490.
- ——— (2001). Ecclesiastes, Song of Songs: From biblical text ... to contemporary life. NIV Application Commentary. Grand Rapids, MI: Zondervan. ISBN 978-0-310-21372-7. OCLC 45418930.
- ———; Long, V. Philips; Longman III, Tremper (2003). A Biblical History of Israel (1st ed.). Louisville, KY: Westminster John Knox Press. ISBN 978-0-664-22090-7. OCLC 52055642.
- ——— (2008). Tenants in God's Land: Earth-keeping and people-keeping in the Old Testament. Grove Ethics Series. Vol. E148. Cambridge: Grove Books. ISBN 978-1-851-74676-7. OCLC 221562488.
- ———; Boda, Mark J., eds. (2012). Let Us Go Up To Zion: Essays in honour of H.G.M. Williamson on the occasion of his sixty-fifth birthday. Supplements to Vetus Testamentum. Vol. 153. Leiden; Boston: Brill. ISBN 978-9-004-21598-6. OCLC 801777561.
- ——— (2013). Convenient Myths: The axial age, dark green religion, and the world that never was. Waco, TX: Baylor University Press. ISBN 978-1-602-58996-4. OCLC 826895211.
- ——— (2014). Seriously Dangerous Religion: What the Old Testament really says and why it matters. Waco, TX: Baylor University Press. ISBN 978-1-481-30022-3. OCLC 854612649.
- ——— (2015). Discovering Genesis: Content, interpretation, reception. London: SPCK Publishing. ISBN 978-0-281-07085-5. OCLC 923368815.
- ———; Long, V. Philips; Longman III, Tremper (2003). A Biblical History of Israel (2nd ed.). Louisville, KY: Westminster, John Knox Press. ISBN 978-0-664-23913-8. OCLC 913572963.
- ——— (2017). The Reformation and the Right Reading of Scripture. Waco, TX: Baylor University Press. ISBN 978-1-481-30608-9.
- ——— (2020). Seeking What is Right: The Old Testament and the Good Life. Waco, TX: Baylor University Press. ISBN 978-1-481-31288-2.
- ——— (2023). Cuckoos in our Nest: Truth and Lies about Being Human. Eugene, OR: Cascade Books. ISBN 978-1-6667-6870-1.

=== Chapters ===
- ——— (2012). "Pain in childbirth?: Further thoughts on "an attractive fragment" (1 Chronicles 4:9-10)". In ———; Boda, Mark J. (eds.). Let Us Go Up To Zion: Essays in honour of H.G.M. Williamson on the occasion of his sixty-fifth birthday. Supplements to Vetus Testamentum. Vol. 153. Leiden; Boston: Brill. pp. 285–96. ISBN 978-9-004-21598-6. OCLC 801777561.
