= Niels Peter Lemche =

Danish biblical scholar

Niels Peter Lemche (born 6 September 1945) is a biblical scholar at the University of Copenhagen, whose interests include early Israel and its relationship with history, the Old Testament, and archaeology.

== Career ==
In 1971 Lemche received his undergraduate degree in theology at the University of Copenhagen, starting his long career at that institution. From 1972 to 1978 he worked there in various capacity until he was taken on as an associate professor. In 1985 he finished his doctorate in theology with a thesis on "Early Israel", a topic which has kept his interest for the last three decades. In 1987 Lemche founded the Scandinavian Journal of the Old Testament with Knud Jeppesen, a publication with which he has since been associated as chief editor. In 1987 he became Professor of Old Testament exegesis at the Faculty of Theology and served as vice dean of the faculty from 1993 to 1999.

== Scholarly interests ==
Lemche is closely identified with the movement known as biblical minimalism and "has assumed the role of philosophical and methodological spokesperson" for the movement.

Charles David Isbell sees Lemche as attempting to dismantle and discredit the "historical-critical" method of Old Testament scholarship. Lemche himself writes that the 'so-called "historical-critical" school that created a universe of its own dubbed "ancient Israel" has dominated the last two hundred years of biblical studies.' He argues that "ancient Israel" is the product of the Jewish community that was of "the Persian and especially Hellenistic and Roman periods".

In common with the general trend of modern scholarship, Lemche identifies the Persian and Hellenistic period (5th century to 4th century BCE) as the most appropriate setting in which to seek the composition of the majority of the biblical texts, arguing that this is the single period that best explains the 'mental matrix’ for most Old Testament literature and "probably all of its historiography".

Lemche considers the traditional narratives of Israel's history as contained in the Bible to be so late in origin as to be useless for historical reconstruction. His alternative reconstruction is based entirely on the archaeological record and may be summarized as follows:<

From at least as early as the first half of the 14th century BCE the central highlands were the habitation of the Apiru, "a para-social element ... [consisting] of runaway former non-free peasants or copyholders from the small city-states in the plains and valleys of Palestine," living as "outlaw groups of freebooters". When new settlements appear in the highlands over a century later, at the start of the Iron Age, they are evidence of new political structures emerging among those same groups. The Iron I settlements attest a return by those groups to a settled, agricultural lifestyle, and the beginning of a (re)tribalization process. Israel was the end-product of that process. Lemche's view has much in common with that of Israel Finkelstein.

== Publications ==
- "Early Israel: Anthropological and Historical Studies on the Israelite Society Before the Monarchy" (Brill, 1986)
- "Ancient Israel: A New History of Israelite Society" (Continuum International Publishing Group, 1988)
- "The Canaanites and Their Land: The Tradition of the Canaanites" (Sheffield Academic Press, 1991)
- "The Israelites in History and Tradition" (Westminster John Knox Press, 1998) ISBN 0-664-22075-4
- "Prelude To Israel's Past: Background & Beginnings Of Israelite History & Identity" (Hendrickson Publishers, 1998)
- "Historical Dictionary of Ancient Israel" (The Scarecrow Press, 2003)
- "The Old Testament Between Theology and History: A Critical Survey" (Westminster John Knox Press, 2008)
- "Biblical Studies and the Failure of History" (Routledge, 2015)

== See also ==
- Biblical minimalism
- Documentary hypothesis
- Biblical criticism
