= Biblical archaeology =

Archaeological sub-discipline

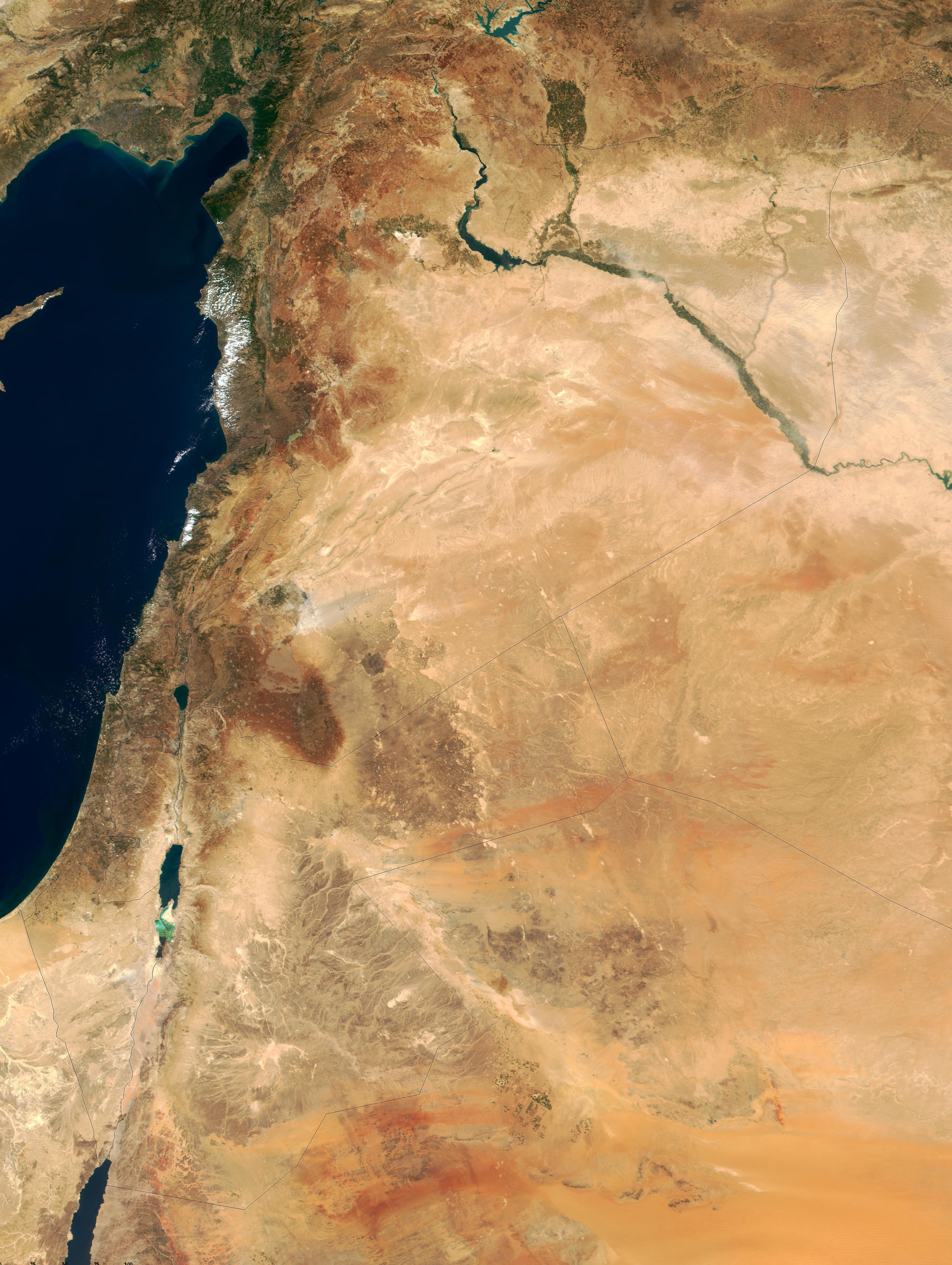
The Levant and Canaan

Biblical archaeology is an academic school and a subset of Biblical studies and Levantine archaeology. Biblical archaeology studies archaeological sites from the Ancient Near East and especially the Holy Land (also known as Land of Israel and Canaan), from biblical times.

The Hebrew Bible is typically the main reference in biblical archaeology, as it broadly covers the Iron Age Palestinian region. Its primary purpose is to use the archeological record to attempt to fill in gaps in biblical historiography. Although both the Hebrew Bible and the New Testament are taken into account, the majority of the study centers around the former.

== History ==
The study of biblical archaeology started at the same time as general archaeology, the development of which relates to the discovery of highly important ancient artifacts.

Biblical archaeology emerged in the late 19th century, by British and American archaeologists, with the aim of confirming the historicity of the Bible. Between the 1920s, right after World War I, when Palestine came under British rule and the 1960s, biblical archaeology became the dominant American school of Levantine archaeology, led by figures such as William F. Albright and G. Ernest Wright. The work was mostly funded by churches and headed by theologians. From the late 1960s, biblical archaeology was influenced by processual archaeology ("New Archaeology") and faced issues that made it push aside the religious aspects of the research. This has led the American schools to shift away from biblical studies and focus on the archaeology of the region and its relation with the biblical text, rather than trying to prove or disprove the biblical account.

=== Biblical archaeology today ===
The model of "biblical archaeology" has collapsed. William G. Dever has correctly described the secularization of "biblical archaeology", but he abandoned the name "Syro-Palestinian archaeology". His papers from 1992 and 1993 were in many ways predictive of what was to come, but the name of the field he used did not stick. Twenty-first century biblical archaeology is often conducted by international teams sponsored by universities and government institutions such as the Israel Antiquities Authority. Volunteers are recruited to participate in excavations conducted by a staff of professionals. Practitioners are making increasing efforts to relate the results of one excavation to others nearby in an attempt to create an ever-widening, increasingly detailed overview of the ancient history and culture of each region. Recent rapid advances in technology have facilitated more scientifically precise measurements in dozens of related fields, as well as more timely and more broadly disseminated reports. Many archaeological findings from Israel-Palestine are banned from publishing, for political reasons.

Archaeology researches whether the stories from the Bible are "true", in the sense of positivism, not in the sense of cultural history.

=== Schools of thought ===
A controversy in recent biblical scholarship demonstrates both the problems and the stakes in history writing. In the 1990s, two camps purportedly faced off against each other, the "maximalists" and the "minimalists." As the disagreement was often depicted in the media, the "maximalist" approach accepts most of the history recorded in the Hebrew Bible as true except for those individual parts that have been definitely proven false (e.g., by archaeology), while the "minimalist" view does not assume that biblical details are historically accurate until they are established as such.

— Douglas A. Knight and Amy-Jill Levine (2011)

The impression one has now is that the debate has settled down. Although they do not seem to admit it, the minimalists have triumphed in many ways. That is, most scholars reject the historicity of the 'patriarchal period', see the settlement as mostly made up of indigenous inhabitants of Canaan and are cautious about the early monarchy. The exodus is rejected or assumed to be based on an event much different from the biblical account. On the other hand, there is not the widespread rejection of the biblical text as a historical source that one finds among the main minimalists. There are few, if any, maximalists (defined as those who accept the biblical text unless it can be absolutely disproved) in mainstream scholarship, only on the more fundamentalist fringes.

— Lester L. Grabbe (2017)

=== Biblical archeological forgeries ===
Biblical archaeology has also been the target of several celebrated forgeries, which have been perpetrated for a variety of reasons. One of the most celebrated is that of the James Ossuary, when information came to light in 2002 regarding the discovery of an ossuary, with an inscription that translated to "Jacob, son of Joseph and brother of Jesus". In reality the artifact had been discovered twenty years before, after which it had exchanged hands a number of times and the inscription had been added. This was discovered because it did not correspond to the pattern of the epoch from which it dated.

The object came by way of the antiques dealer Oded Golan, who was accused by the Israel Antiquities Authority (IAA) of forgery, but after a 7-year trial he was acquitted on the grounds of reasonable doubt. Another item that came from the same dealer was the Jehoash Inscription, which describes repairs to the temple in Jerusalem. The authenticity of the inscription is debated.

== Biblical archaeology and the Catholic Church ==
In 1943, Pope Pius XII recommended that interpretations of the scripture take archaeological findings into account in order to discern the literary genres used.

[...] the interpreter must, as it were, go back wholly in spirit to those remote centuries of the East and with the aid of history, archaeology, ethnology, and other sciences, accurately determine what modes of writing, so to speak, the authors of that ancient period would be likely to use, and in fact did use. [...]Let those who cultivate biblical studies turn their attention with all due diligence towards this point and let them neglect none of those discoveries, whether in the domain of archaeology or in ancient history or literature, which serve to make better known the mentality of the ancient writers, as well as their manner and art of reasoning, narrating and writing.[...]

— Pius XII, Encyclical Divino Afflante Spiritu, paragraphs 35 and 40

Since this time, archaeology has been considered to provide valuable assistance and as an indispensable tool of the biblical sciences.

== Expert commentaries ==
[...]"the purpose of biblical archaeology is the clarification and illumination of the biblical text and content through archaeological investigation of the biblical world."

— written by J.K. Eakins in a 1977 essay published in Benchmarks in Time and Culture and quoted in his essay "Archaeology and the Bible, An Introduction".

Archaeologist William G. Dever contributed to the article on "Archaeology" in the Anchor Bible Dictionary. In the article, Dever reiterated his perceptions of the negative effects of the close relationship that has existed between Syro-Palestinian archaeology and biblical archaeology, which had caused the archaeologists working in the field, particularly the American archaeologists, to resist adoption of the new methods of processual archaeology. In addition, he considered that "underlying much scepticism in our own field [referring to the adaptation of the concepts and methods of a "new archaeology", one suspects the assumption (although unexpressed or even unconscious) that ancient Palestine, especially Israel during the biblical period, was unique, in some "superhistorical" way that was not governed by the normal principles of cultural evolution".

Dever found that Syro-Palestinian archaeology had been treated in American institutions as a sub-discipline of bible studies, where it was expected that American archaeologists would try to "provide valid historical evidence of episodes from the biblical tradition". According to Dever, "the most naïve [idea regarding Syro-Palestinian archaeology] is that the reason and purpose of "biblical archaeology" (and, by extrapolation, of Syro-Palestinian archaeology) is simply to elucidate facts regarding the Bible and the Holy Land".

Dever has also written that:

Archaeology certainly doesn't prove literal readings of the Bible...It calls them into question, and that's what bothers some people. Most people really think that archaeology is out there to prove the Bible. No archaeologist thinks so. [...] From the beginnings of what we call biblical archaeology, perhaps 150 years ago, scholars, mostly western scholars, have attempted to use archaeological data to prove the Bible. And for a long time it was thought to work. William Albright, the great father of our discipline, often spoke of the "archaeological revolution." Well, the revolution has come but not in the way that Albright thought. The truth of the matter today is that archaeology raises more questions about the historicity of the Hebrew Bible and even the New Testament than it provides answers, and that's very disturbing to some people.

— William G. Dever (2008, 2007)

Dever also wrote:

Archaeology as it is practiced today must be able to challenge, as well as confirm, the Bible stories. Some things described there really did happen, but others did not. The biblical narratives about Abraham, Moses, Joshua and Solomon probably reflect some historical memories of people and places, but the 'larger than life' portraits of the Bible are unrealistic and contradicted by the archaeological evidence.... I am not reading the Bible as Scripture... I am in fact not even a theist. My view all along—and especially in the recent books—is first that the biblical narratives are indeed 'stories,' often fictional and almost always propagandistic, but that here and there they contain some valid historical information...

— William G. Dever (2006, 2003)

Tel Aviv University archaeologist Ze'ev Herzog wrote the following in the Haaretz newspaper:

This is what archaeologists have learned from their excavations in the Land of Israel: the Israelites were never in Egypt, did not wander in the desert, did not conquer the land in a military campaign and did not pass it on to the 12 tribes of Israel. Perhaps even harder to swallow is that the united monarchy of David and Solomon, which is described by the Bible as a regional power, was at most a small tribal kingdom. And it will come as an unpleasant shock to many that the God of Israel, YHWH, had a female consort and that the early Israelite religion adopted monotheism only in the waning period of the monarchy and not at Mount Sinai.

— Ze'ev Herzog (1999)

Other scholars have argued that Asherah may have been a symbol or icon in the context of Yahwism rather than a deity in her own right, and her association with Yahweh does not necessarily indicate a polytheistic belief system. However, Judahite/Israelite polytheism is a commonplace for mainstream historians. William Foxwell Albright, the leader of a past generation of biblical archaeologists, was not, however, a biblical literalist, Yahweh and the Gods of Canaan, for example, advocating the view that the religion of the Israelites evolved from an original polytheism to a monotheism that saw God acting in history—a view fully consistent with the main views of the last two centuries of biblical criticism before him.

Professor Israel Finkelstein told The Jerusalem Post that Jewish archaeologists have found no historical or archaeological evidence to back the biblical narrative on the Exodus, the Jews' wandering in Sinai or Joshua's conquest of Canaan. On the alleged Temple of Solomon, Finkelstein said that there is no archaeological evidence to prove it really existed. Professor Yoni Mizrahi, an independent archaeologist, agreed with Israel Finkelstein.

Regarding the Exodus of Israelites from Egypt, Egyptian archaeologist Zahi Hawass said:

Really, it's a myth,... This is my career as an archaeologist. I should tell them the truth. If the people are upset, that is not my problem.

— Zahi Hawass (2007)

Other scholars dispute these claims. Avraham Faust renders in 2023 the academic consensus about the number of people from The Exodus: "most scholars agree that it was in the range of a few thousands, or even perhaps only hundreds." Scholar Richard Elliott Friedman argues that while evidence of a large-scale Exodus is lacking, this does not preclude the departure of a smaller group from Egypt. He notes:

There is no archaeological evidence against the historicity of an exodus if it was a smaller group who left Egypt. Indeed, significantly, the first biblical mention of the Exodus, the Song of Miriam, which is the oldest text in the Bible, never mentions how many people were involved in the Exodus, and it never speaks of the whole nation of Israel. It just refers to a people, an "am", leaving Egypt."

— Richard Elliott Friedman (2013)

In his 2001 book The Old Testament Documents: Are They Reliable and Relevant? Evangelical Old Testament scholar Walter Kaiser, Jr. included a chapter entitled, "Does Archaeology Help the Case for Reliability?". Kaiser states:

[T]he study of archaeology has helped illuminate the Bible by casting light on its historical and cultural location. With increasing clarity, the setting of the Bible appears more vividly within the framework of general history.... by fitting biblical history, persons, and events into general history, archaeology has demonstrated the validity of many biblical references and data. It has continued to cast light, whether implicitly or explicitly, on many of the Bible's customs, cultures, and settings during various periods of history. On the other hand, archaeology has also given rise to some real problems with regard to its findings. Thus, its work is an ongoing one that cannot be foreclosed too quickly or used merely as a confirming device.

— Walter Kaiser, Jr. (2001)

Kaiser goes on to detail case after case in which the Bible, he says, "has aided in the identification of missing persons, missing peoples, missing customs and settings." He concludes:

This is not to say that archaeology is a cure-all for all the challenges brought to the text—it is not! There are some monstrous problems that remain—some created by the archaeological data itself. But since we have seen so many specific challenges over the years yield to such specific data in favor of the text, a presumption tends to build that we should go with the text until definite contrary information is available. This methodology that says that the text is innocent until proven guilty is not only recommended as a good procedure for American jurisprudence, but it is recommended in the area of examining the claims of the Scripture as well.

— Walter Kaiser, Jr. (2001)

Collins comments upon a statement by Dever:

"there is little that we can salvage from Joshua's stories of the rapid, wholesale destruction of Canaanite cities and the annihilation of the local population. It simply did not happen; the archeological evidence is indisputable."

This is the judgment of one of the more conservative historians of ancient Israel. To be sure, there are far more conservative historians who try to defend the historicity of the entire biblical account beginning with Abraham, but their work rests on confessional presuppositions and is an exercise in apologetics rather than historiography. Most biblical scholars have come to terms with the fact that much (not all!) of the biblical narrative is only loosely related to history and cannot be verified.

— John J. Collins (2008)

More recently, Lorenzo Nigro from the Italian-Palestinian Expedition to Tell es-Sultan has argued that there was some sort of settlement at the site during the 14th and 13th centuries BCE. He states that the expedition has detected Late Bronze II layers in several parts of the tell, although its top layers were heavily cut by levelling operations during the Iron Age, which explains the scarcity of 13th century materials. Nigro says that the idea that the Biblical account should have a literal archaeological correspondence is erroneous, and "any attempt to seriously identify something on the ground with biblical personages and their acts" is hazardous.

In 2023, Nigro confirmed that Jericho was occupied in the Late Bronze Age (1400–1200 BCE). During this period, the previous Middle Bronze Age city wall was refurbished by adding a mudbrick wall on top of its emerging crest. The city also had a structure known as the "Middle Building" which apparently served as the residence of its local rulers, then vassals of the Egyptian empire. There also appears to be evidence that the Middle Building was eventually destroyed, only being reused later in the early Iron Age. In 2024, an interim report from Nigro stated that the large Garstang wall previously suggested to be built in the Late Bronze Age, actually dated to the Early Bronze Age. However, an ordinary wall may tentatively be placed in the Late Bronze or Early Iron Age.

As a young student, I heard a series of lectures given by a famous liberal Old Testament theologian on Old Testament introduction. And there one day learned that the fifth book of Moses (Deuteronomy) had not been written by Moses—although throughout it it claims to have been spoken and written by Moses himself. Rather, I heard Deuteronomy had been composed centuries later for quite specific purposes. Since I came from an orthodox Lutheran family, was deeply moved by what I heard—in particular, because it convinced me. So the same day I sought out my teacher during his hours and, in connection with the origin of Deuteronomy, let slip the remark, "So is the fifth book of Moses what might be called a forgery?" His answer was, "For God's sake, it may well be, but you can't say anything like that."

I wanted to use that quotation in order to show that the results of historical scholarship can be made known to the public—especially to believers—only with difficulty. Many Christians feel threatened if they hear that most of what was written in the Bible is (in historical terms) untrue and that none of the four New Testament Gospels was written by the author listed at the top of the text.

— Gerd Lüdemann (2000)

Modern Bible scholarship/scholars (MBS) assumes that: [...] ✦ Consequently MBS often reject the alleged "facts" of the Bible (e.g. was Abraham a real person? Did the Israelites leave Egypt in a mighty Exodus? Was Solomon the king of a mighty empire?);

— Beardsley Ruml (2014), Shaye J.D. Cohen's Lecture Notes: INTRO TO THE HEBREW BIBLE @ Harvard (BAS website) (78 pages)

Most Israelites were actually of Canaanite stock; their ancestors did not participate in an Exodus from Egypt; Israelites did not build the pyramids!!!

— Shaye J. D. Cohen (2014)

People who equate truth with historical fact will certainly end up viewing the Bible dismissively, as a naïve and unsophisticated web of lies, since it is replete with elements that cannot be literally true. But to view it this way is to make a genre mistake. Shakespeare's Hamlet, while set in Denmark, an actual place, is not historical fact. [...] many scholars are willing to accept the general biblical chronology of the period from the monarchy on: starting about 1000 on, they accept that general chronology; the sequence of kings and battles and so on.

— Christine Hayes (2006)

But the archaeological record has not been friendly for one vital issue, Israel's origins: the period of slavery in Egypt, the mass departure of Israelite slaves from Egypt, and the violent conquest of the land of Canaan by the Israelites. The strong consensus is that there is at best sparse indirect evidence for plausibility of these biblical episodes, and for the conquest there is considerable evidence against the biblical description.

— Peter Enns (2013)

Current scholarly consensus based on archaeology holds the enslavement and exodus traditions to be unhistorical.

— Moshe Greenberg and S. David Sperling (2007)

The result has been a growing consensus that the biblical text of Joshua is historically unreliable.

— David Merling (2001)

Most scholars now distance themselves from the mythical conquest model and the "prove the Bible" methodology.

— Efraín Velázquez II (2009, 2008)

Most scholars favor the idea that most Israelites emerged from within Canaan.

— Matthew J. Lynch (2023)

To be sure, there may have been a 'Moses group,' themselves of Canaanite extraction, who experienced slavery and liberation from Egypt, but most scholars believe that such a group—if it existed—was only a small minority in early Israel, even though their story came to be claimed by all.

— David M. Carr (2021, 2010)

But recently, a "consensus" date of mid-thirteenth century BCE has developed. In the early days of using archaeology to interpret the Bible, scholars such as William F. Albright and his students believed that their excavations were confirming a thirteenth-century BCE exodus just as the Old Testament seems to indicate. They believed that their finds at the ancient sites of Debir, Bethel, and Hazor proved that the conquest of Canaan (which according to the Bible happened forty years after the exodus) had taken place just as the book of Joshua reported it. Then the edifice began to crumble. Perhaps the most cogent refutation of a thirteenth-century exodus has been done by Israel Finkelstein and Neil Asher Silberman.

— David A. Fiensy (2017)

Joshua Schachterle (2025) listed ten biblical claims which have been debunked by archaeology.

The only reasonable conclusion at the present time is that Israel was never enslaved in Egypt. Instead, the Israelites were people who already lived in Canaan and worked in servitude to distant Egypt, somewhat like feudal serfs. Consequently, there was no Exodus and no trek through the desert. The people "Israel" did not come from outside the land and there was no conquest of a new land. [...] Everything points to the conclusion that the Torah's account of the Israelites as outsiders is not historically accurate.

— S. David Sperling (2022)

Jerusalem was no exception, except that it was barely a city—by our standards, just a village. In David's time, its population was only a few thousand, who lived on about a dozen acres, roughly equal to two blocks in Midtown Manhattan.

— Michael Coogan (2010)

The truth of the matter is even in Israel—surely the "heartland" of the Bible—the vast accumulation of archaeological data, probably 80–90%, has little if anything to do directly with the Bible. That is fundamentalism's basic and crippling misunderstanding about modern archaeology in the Middle East. [...] On point 2, there is no empirical evidence for an exodus of Semitic slaves from Egypt of biblical proportions (although we know of the presence of Asiatics in the Delta from the early twentieth century BCE onward). Nor is there any evidence for the larger-than-life Moses. Mt. Sinai has never been located, despite repeated claims. And nearly all scholars now acknowledge polytheism was prevalent throughout Israel's history until the exile and beyond, not only in family cults but even in the Jerusalem temple and its clergy. [...] On point 3, there was no statistically significant military conquest of Canaan in the thirteenth–twelfth centuries BCE. The evidence is overwhelmingly in support of various "indigenous origins" models, emphasizing "long-term" social and cultural evolution from "Canaanite" to "Israelite" ethnicity. No mainstream biblicist or archaeologist any longer espouses the conquest model.

— William G. Dever (2023)

Modern scholars generally agree that the narratives in the Pentateuch are not an accurate record of past events.

— Philip J. Senter (2022)

So although much of the archaeological evidence demonstrates that the Hebrew Bible cannot in most cases be taken literally, many of the people, places and things probably did exist at some time or another.

— Jonathan M. Golden (2004)

== See also ==
- Biblical Archaeology Society
- Biblical studies
- Dead Sea scrolls
- Flood geology
- Frauds, Myths, and Mysteries
- History of ancient Israel and Judah
- Iron Age
- List of inscriptions in biblical archaeology
- Religiously motivated pseudoarchaeology
- Scriptural geologist
- Society of Biblical Archaeology
- The Bible's Buried Secrets
- The Bible and history

== Sources ==
- Dever, William G. (1992). "Archaeology". In Freedman, David Noel; Herion, Gary A. (eds.). The Anchor Yale Bible Dictionary, A-C. Vol. 1. ISBN 978-0-300-14001-9.
- Finkelstein, Israel; Silberman, Neil Asher (2002) [2001], The Bible Unearthed: Archaeology's New Vision of Ancient Israel and the Origin of Its Sacred Texts, New York: Simon and Schuster, ISBN 0-7432-2338-1.
- Kaiser, Walter C. (2001). The Old Testament Documents. Downers Grove, Ill.: InterVarsity Press. ISBN 978-0-8308-1975-1. OCLC 1105317154.
- Nigro, Lorenzo (2020a). "The Italian-Palestinian Expedition to Tell es-Sultan, Ancient Jericho (1997–2015)". In Sparks, Rachel T.; Finlayson, Bill; Wagemakers, Bart; Briffa SJ, Josef Mario (eds.). Digging Up Jericho: Past, Present and Future. Archaeopress Publishing Ltd. ISBN 978-1-78969-352-2.
- Sommer, Benjamin D. (2009). The Bodies of God and the World of Ancient Israel. Cambridge University Press. ISBN 978-1139477789.
