= Jews =

Ethnoreligious group

יְהוּדִים (Hebrew: Yehudim)
- The Star of David, a common symbol of the Jewish people

Total population
- 15.2 million Enlarged population (includes anyone with a Jewish parent): 20 million (Note: The global core Jewish population was estimated at approximately 15,263,500 in 2022. Including individuals who identify as partly Jewish and anyone with one or two Jewish parents increases the estimate to 20,028,800. Adding individuals with a Jewish background but without Jewish parents, and non-Jewish household members living with Jews, yields an enlarged estimate of 22,720,400.) (2022, est.)

Regions with significant populations
- Israel (incl. occupied territories): 7,300,000–7,455,200
- United States: 6,300,000–7,500,000
- France: 438,500–550,000
- Canada: 400,000–450,000
- United Kingdom: 312,000–330,000
- Argentina: 171,000–240,000
- Russia: 132,000–290,000
- Germany: 125,000–175,000
- Australia: 117,200–130,000
- Brazil: 90,000–120,000
- South Africa: 51,000–75,000
- Ukraine: 40,000–90,000
- Hungary: 46,500–75,000
- Mexico: 40,000–45,000
- Netherlands: 29,700–43,000
- Belgium: 28,800–35,000
- Italy: 27,000–34,000
- Switzerland: 18,800–22,000
- Uruguay: 16,300–20,000
- Chile: 15,800–20,000
- Sweden: 14,900–20,000
- Turkey: 14,300–17,500
- Spain: 12,900–16,000
- Austria: 10,300–14,000
- Panama: 10,000–11,000

Languages
- Predominantly spoken: Modern Hebrew; Yiddish; English; Russian; French; Spanish; Historical: Yiddish; Ladino; Judeo-Arabic; others; Sacred: Biblical Hebrew; Biblical Aramaic; Talmudic Aramaic

Religion
- Majority: Judaism; Minority: Irreligion

Related ethnic groups
- Samaritans, Arabs, Assyrians, and others

Jews, (Note: Hebrew: יְהוּדִים, ISO 259-2: Yehudim, Israeli pronunciation: [jehuˈdim]; Yiddish: ייִדן, romanized: Yidn; Ladino: ג׳ודיוס, romanized: Djudios) or the Jewish people, are an ethnoreligious group and nation, originating in the Israelites of ancient Israel and Judah. They traditionally adhere to Judaism. Jewish ethnicity, religion, and community are highly interrelated, as Judaism is an ethnic religion, though many ethnic Jews do not practice it. Jews regard converts to Judaism as members of the Jewish nation, pursuant to the long-standing conversion process.

The Israelites emerged from the pre-existing Canaanite peoples to establish the kingdoms of Israel and Judah in the Southern Levant during the Iron Age. Originally, "Jews" referred to the inhabitants of Judah, and were distinguished from the gentiles and the Samaritans. According to the Hebrew Bible, these inhabitants predominantly originate from the tribe of Judah, who were descendants of Judah, the fourth son of Jacob. The tribe of Benjamin were another significant demographic in Judah and were considered Jews too. By the late 6th century BCE, Judaism had evolved from the Israelite religion, dubbed Yahwism by modern scholars, having a theology that religious Jews believe to be the expression of the Mosaic covenant between God and the Jewish people. After the Babylonian exile, Jews referred to followers of Judaism, descendants of the Israelites, citizens of Judea, or allies of the Judean state. Jewish migration within the Mediterranean region during the Hellenistic period, followed by population transfers, caused by events like the Jewish–Roman wars, gave rise to the Jewish diaspora, consisting of diverse Jewish communities that maintained their sense of Jewish history, identity, and culture.

In the following millennia, Jewish diaspora communities coalesced into three major ethnic subdivisions according to where their ancestors settled: the Ashkenazim (Central and Eastern Europe), the Sephardim (Iberian Peninsula, later North Africa), and the Mizrahim (Asia and sometimes includes North Africa). While these three major divisions account for most of the world's Jews, there are other smaller Jewish groups outside of the three. Prior to World War II, the global Jewish population reached a peak of 16.7 million, representing around 0.7% of the world's population at that time. During World War II, approximately six million Jews throughout Europe were systematically murdered by Nazi Germany in a genocide known as the Holocaust. Since then, the population has slowly risen again, and as of 2021, was estimated to be at 15.2 million by the demographer Sergio Della Pergola or less than 0.2% of the total world population in 2012. (Note: The exact world Jewish population, however, is difficult to measure. In addition to issues with census methodology, disputes among proponents of halakhic, secular, political, and ancestral identification factors regarding who is a Jew may affect the figure considerably depending on the source.) Today, over 85% of Jews live in Israel or the United States. Israel, whose population is 73.9% Jewish, is the only country where Jews comprise more than 2.5% of the population.

Jews have significantly influenced and contributed to the development and growth of human progress in many fields, both historically and in modern times, including in science and technology, philosophy, ethics, literature, governance, business, art, music, comedy, theatre, cinema, architecture, food, medicine, and religion. Jews founded Christianity and had an indirect but profound influence on Islam. In these ways and others, Jewish culture has played a significant role in the development of Western culture.

== Name and etymology ==
The term "Jew" is derived from the Hebrew word יְהוּדִי Yehudi, with the plural יְהוּדִים Yehudim. Endonyms in other Jewish languages include the Ladino ג׳ודיו Djudio (plural ג׳ודיוס, Djudios) and the Yiddish ייִד Yid (plural ייִדן Yidn).

The Book of Genesis 29:35 and 49:8 connect "Judah" with the verb yada, meaning "praise". Some scholars state that "Judah" derives from the name of a Levantine geographic region dominated by gorges and ravines. The gradual ethnonymic shift from "Israelites" to "Jews", irrespective of whether their descent was from Judah or Jacob (Israel), although not mentioned in the Torah, does appear later in the Hebrew Bible (Tanakh), in the Book of Esther (4th century BCE). Some modern scholars disagree with the conflation, based on the works of Josephus, Philo and Apostle Paul.

The English word "Jew" is a derivation of Middle English Gyw, Iewe. The latter was loaned from the Old French giu, which itself evolved from the earlier juieu, which in turn derived from judieu/iudieu which through elision had dropped the letter "d" from the Medieval Latin Iudaeus, which, like the New Testament Greek term Ioudaios, meant both "Jew" and "Judean" / "of Judea". The Greek term was a loan from Aramaic *yahūdāy, corresponding to Hebrew יְהוּדִי Yehudi.

Some scholars prefer translating Ioudaios as "Judean" in the Bible since it is more precise, denotes the community's origins and prevents readers from engaging in antisemitic eisegesis. Others disagree, believing that it erases the Jewish identity of Biblical characters such as Jesus. Daniel R. Schwartz distinguishes "Judean" and "Jew". Here, "Judean" refers to the inhabitants of Judea, which encompassed southern Palestine. Meanwhile, "Jew" refers to the descendants of Israelites that adhere to Judaism. Converts are included in the definition. But Shaye J. D. Cohen argues that "Judean" is inclusive of believers of the Judean God and allies of the Judean state. Another scholar, Jodi Magness, wrote the term Ioudaioi refers to a "people of Judahite/Judean ancestry who worshipped the God of Israel as their national deity and (at least nominally) lived according to his laws."

The etymological equivalent is in use in other languages, e.g., يَهُودِيّ yahūdī (sg.), al-yahūd (pl.), in Arabic, "Jude" in German, "judeu" in Portuguese, "Juif" (m.)/"Juive" (f.) in French, "jøde" in Danish and Norwegian, "judío/a" in Spanish, "jood" in Dutch, "żyd" in Polish etc., but derivations of the word "Hebrew" are also in use to describe a Jew, e.g., in Italian (Ebreo), in Persian ("Ebri/Ebrani" (Persian: عبری/عبرانی)) and Russian (Еврей, Yevrey). The German word "Jude" is pronounced [ˈjuːdə], the corresponding adjective "jüdisch" [ˈjyːdɪʃ] (Jewish) is the origin of the word "Yiddish".

According to The American Heritage Dictionary of the English Language, fourth edition (2000),

It is widely recognized that the attributive use of the noun Jew, in phrases such as Jew lawyer or Jew ethics, is both vulgar and highly offensive. In such contexts Jewish is the only acceptable possibility. Some people, however, have become so wary of this construction that they have extended the stigma to any use of Jew as a noun, a practice that carries risks of its own. In a sentence such as There are now several Jews on the council, which is unobjectionable, the substitution of a circumlocution like Jewish people or persons of Jewish background may in itself cause offense for seeming to imply that Jew has a negative connotation when used as a noun.

== Identity ==
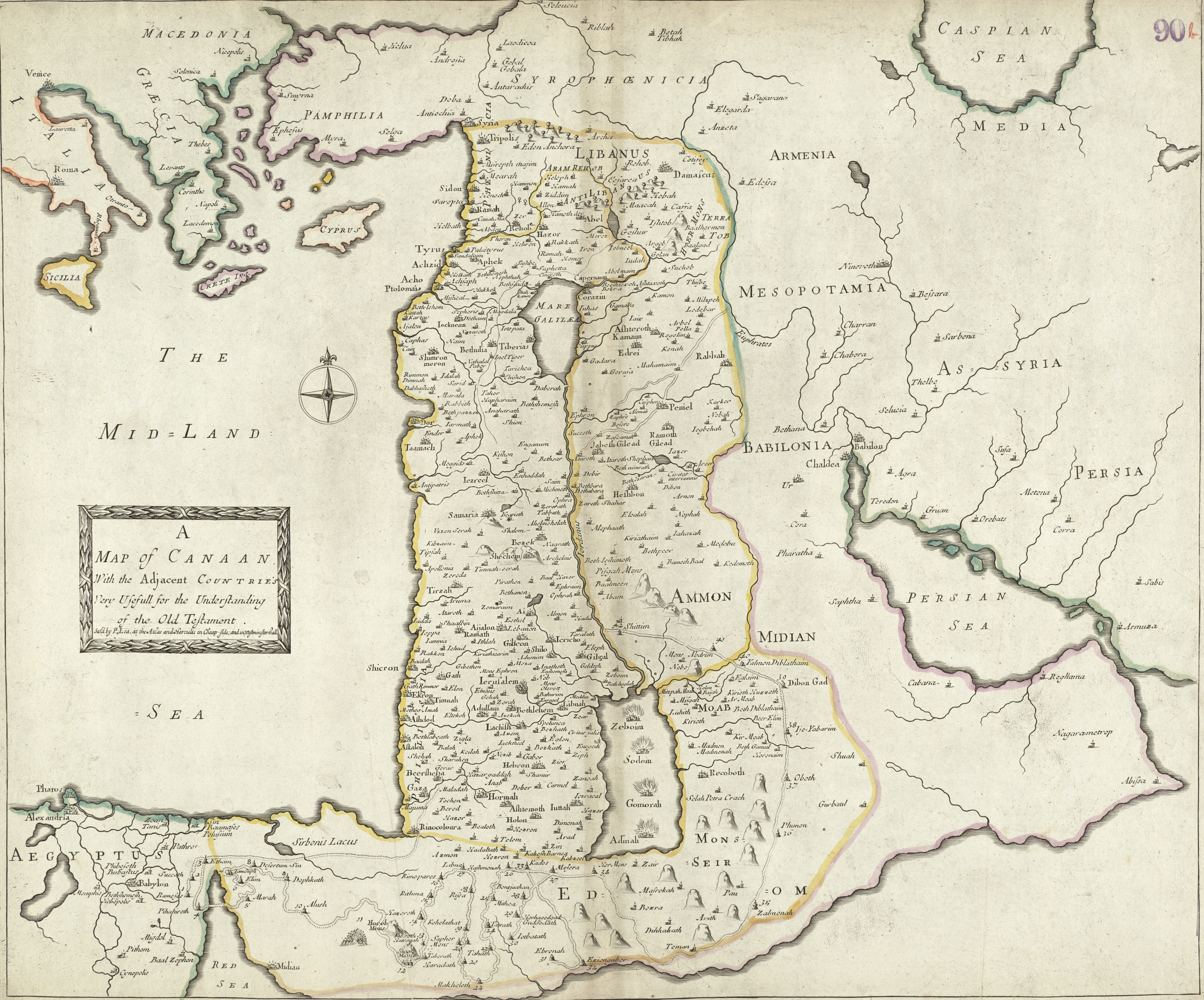
17th century map of Canaan

Judaism shares some of the characteristics of a nation, an ethnicity, a religion, and a culture, making the definition of who is a Jew vary slightly depending on whether a religious or national approach to identity is used. Generally, in modern secular usage, Jews include three groups: people who were born to a Jewish family regardless of whether or not they follow the religion, those who have some Jewish ancestral background or lineage (sometimes including those who do not have strictly matrilineal descent), and people without any Jewish ancestral background or lineage who have formally converted to Judaism and therefore are followers of the religion. In the context of biblical and classical literature, Jews could refer to inhabitants of the Kingdom of Judah, or the broader Judean region, allies of the Judean state, or anyone that followed Judaism.

Historical definitions of Jewish identity have traditionally been based on halakhic definitions of matrilineal descent, and halakhic conversions. These definitions of who is a Jew date back to the codification of the Oral Torah into the Babylonian Talmud, around 200 CE. Interpretations by Jewish sages of sections of the Tanakh – such as Deuteronomy 7:1–5, which forbade intermarriage between their Israelite ancestors and seven non-Israelite nations: "for that [i.e. giving your daughters to their sons or taking their daughters for your sons,] would turn away your children from following me, to serve other gods" – are used as a warning against intermarriage between Jews and gentiles. Leviticus 24:10 says that the son in a marriage between a Hebrew woman and an Egyptian man is "of the community of Israel." This is complemented by Ezra 10:2–3, where Israelites returning from Babylon vow to put aside their gentile wives and their children. A popular theory is that the rape of Jewish women in captivity brought about the law of Jewish identity being inherited through the maternal line, although scholars challenge this theory citing the Talmudic establishment of the law from the pre-exile period. Another argument is that the rabbis changed the law of patrilineal descent to matrilineal descent due to the widespread rape of Jewish women by Roman soldiers. Since the anti-religious Haskalah movement of the late 18th and 19th centuries, halakhic interpretations of Jewish identity have been challenged.

According to historian Shaye J. D. Cohen, the status of the offspring of mixed marriages was determined patrilineally in the Bible. He brings two likely explanations for the change in Mishnaic times: first, the Mishnah may have been applying the same logic to mixed marriages as it had applied to other mixtures (Kil'ayim). Thus, a mixed marriage is forbidden as is the union of a horse and a donkey, and in both unions the offspring are judged matrilineally. Second, the Tannaim may have been influenced by Roman law, which dictated that when a parent could not contract a legal marriage, offspring would follow the mother. Rabbi Rivon Krygier follows a similar reasoning, arguing that Jewish descent had formerly passed through the patrilineal descent and the law of matrilineal descent had its roots in the Roman legal system.

== Origins ==
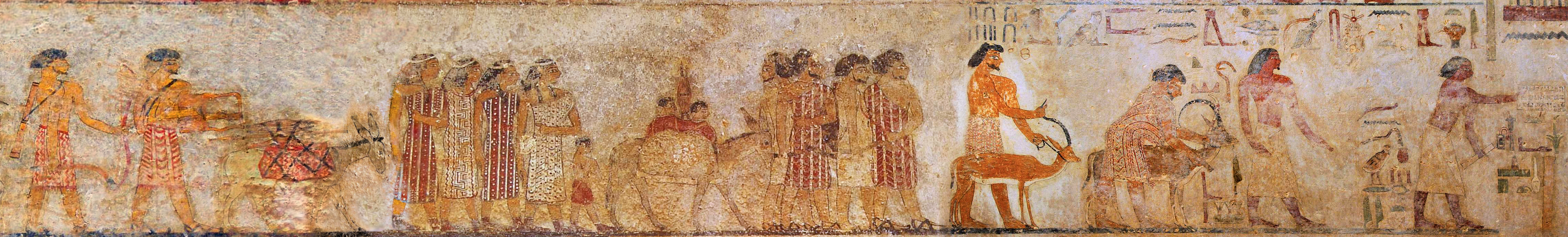
Egyptian depiction of the visit of Western Asiatics in colorful garments, labeled as Aamu. The painting is from the tomb of a 12th dynasty official Khnumhotep II at Beni Hasan, and dated to c. 1900 BCE. Their nearest Biblical contemporaries were the earliest of Hebrews, such as Abraham and Joseph.

The prehistory and ethnogenesis of the Jews are closely intertwined with archaeology, biology, historical textual records, mythology, and religious literature. The ethnic origin of the Jews lie in the Israelites, a confederation of Iron Age Semitic-speaking tribes that inhabited a part of Canaan during the tribal and monarchic periods. Modern Jews are named after and also descended from the southern Israelite Kingdom of Judah.

Gary A. Rendsburg links the early Canaanite nomadic pastoralists confederation to the Shasu known to the Egyptians around the 15th century BCE.

According to the Hebrew Bible narrative, Jewish history begins with the Biblical patriarchs such as Abraham, his son Isaac, Isaac's son Jacob, and the Biblical matriarchs Sarah, Rebecca, Leah, and Rachel, who lived in Canaan. The twelve sons of Jacob subsequently gave birth to the Twelve Tribes. Jacob and his family migrated to Ancient Egypt after being invited to live with Jacob's son Joseph by the Pharaoh himself. Jacob's descendants were later enslaved until the Exodus, led by Moses. Afterwards, the Israelites conquered Canaan under Moses' successor Joshua, and went through the period of the Biblical judges after the death of Joshua. Through the mediation of Samuel, the Israelites were subject to a king, Saul, who was succeeded by David and then Solomon, after whom the United Monarchy ended and was split into a separate Kingdom of Israel and a Kingdom of Judah. The Kingdom of Judah is described as comprising the tribes of Judah, Benjamin and partially, Levi. They later assimilated remnants of other tribes who migrated there from the northern Kingdom of Israel.

In the extra-biblical record, the Israelites become visible as a people between 1200 and 1000 BCE. There is well accepted archeological evidence referring to "Israel" in the Merneptah Stele, which dates to about 1200 BCE, and in the Mesha Stele from 840 BCE. It is debated whether a period like that of the Biblical judges occurred and if there ever was a United Monarchy. There is further disagreement about the earliest existence of the Kingdoms of Israel and Judah and their extent and power. Historians agree that a Kingdom of Israel existed by c. 900 BCE, there is a consensus that a Kingdom of Judah existed by c. 700 BCE at least, and recent excavations in Khirbet Qeiyafa have provided strong evidence for dating the Kingdom of Judah to the 10th century BCE. In 587 BCE, Nebuchadnezzar II, King of the Neo-Babylonian Empire, besieged Jerusalem, destroyed the First Temple and deported parts of the Judahite population.

Scholars disagree regarding the extent to which the Bible should be accepted as a historical source for early Israelite history. Rendsburg states that there are two approximately equal groups of scholars who debate the historicity of the biblical narrative, the minimalists who largely reject it, and the maximalists who largely accept it, with the minimalists being the more vocal of the two.

Some of the leading minimalists reframe the biblical account as constituting the Israelites' inspiring national myth narrative, suggesting that according to the modern archaeological and historical account, the Israelites and their culture did not overtake the region by force, but instead branched out of the Canaanite peoples and culture through the development of a distinct monolatristic—and later monotheistic—religion of Yahwism centered on Yahweh, one of the gods of the Canaanite pantheon. The growth of Yahweh-centric belief, along with a number of cultic practices, gradually gave rise to a distinct Israelite ethnic group, setting them apart from other Canaanites. According to Dever, modern archaeologists have largely discarded the search for evidence of the biblical narrative surrounding the patriarchs and the exodus.

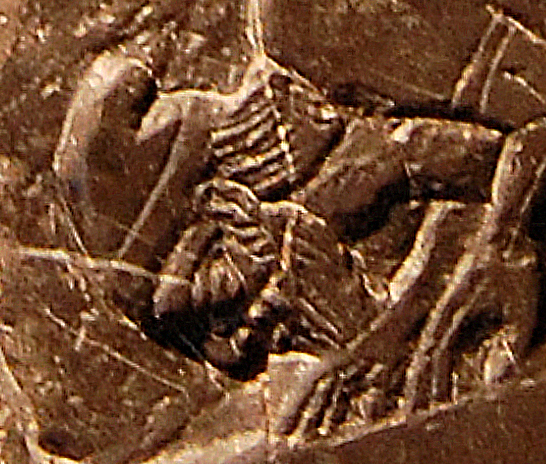
Depiction of King Jehu, tenth king of the northern Kingdom of Israel, on the Black Obelisk of Shalmaneser III, 841–840 BCE. This is "the only portrayal we have in ancient Near Eastern art of an Israelite or Judaean monarch".

According to the maximalist position, the modern archaeological record independently points to a narrative which largely agrees with the biblical account. This narrative provides a testimony of the Israelites as a nomadic people known to the Egyptians as belonging to the Shasu. Over time these nomads left the desert and settled on the central mountain range of the land of Canaan, in simple semi-nomadic settlements in which pig bones are notably absent. This population gradually shifted from a tribal lifestyle to a monarchy. While the archaeological record of the ninth century BCE provides evidence for two monarchies, one in the south under a dynasty founded by a figure named David with its capital in Jerusalem, and one in the north under a dynasty founded by a figure named Omri with its capital in Samaria. It also points to an early monarchic period in which these regions shared material culture and religion, suggesting a common origin. Archaeological finds also provide evidence for the later cooperation of these two kingdoms in their coalition against Aram, and for their destructions by the Assyrians and later by the Babylonians.

Genetic studies on Jews show that most Jews worldwide bear a common genetic heritage which originates in the Middle East, and that they share certain genetic traits with other Gentile peoples of the Fertile Crescent. The genetic composition of different Jewish groups shows that Jews share a common gene pool dating back four millennia, as a marker of their common ancestral origin. Despite their long-term separation, Jewish communities maintained their unique commonalities, propensities, and sensibilities in culture, tradition, and language.

== History ==
=== Ancient Israel and Judah ===
The earliest recorded evidence of a people by the name of Israel appears in the Merneptah Stele, which dates to around 1200 BCE. The majority of scholars agree that this text refers to the Israelites, a group that inhabited the central highlands of Canaan, where archaeological evidence shows that hundreds of small settlements were constructed between the 12th and 10th centuries BCE. The Israelites differentiated themselves from neighboring peoples through various distinct characteristics, including religious practices, prohibition on intermarriage, and an emphasis on genealogy and family history.

In the 10th century BCE, two neighboring Israelite kingdoms—the northern Kingdom of Israel and the southern Kingdom of Judah—emerged. Since their inception, they shared ethnic, cultural, linguistic and religious characteristics despite a complicated relationship. Israel, with its capital mostly in Samaria, was larger and wealthier, and soon developed into a regional power. In contrast, Judah, with its capital in Jerusalem, was less prosperous and covered a smaller, mostly mountainous territory. However, while in Israel the royal succession was often decided by a military coup d'état, resulting in several dynasty changes, political stability in Judah was much greater, as it was ruled by the House of David for the whole four centuries of its existence. Scholars also describe Biblical Jews as a 'proto-nation', in the modern nationalist sense, comparable to classical Greeks, the Gauls and the British Celts.

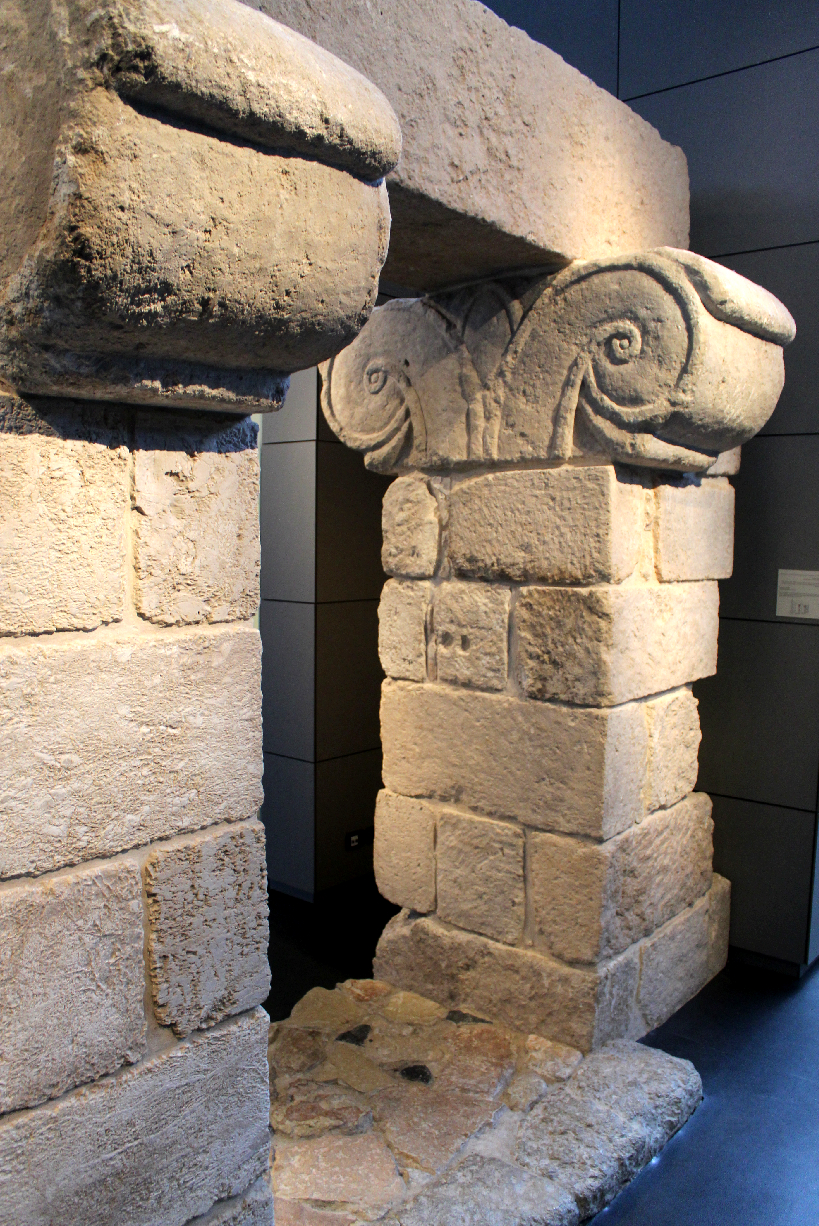
Gate from the Israelite city of Hazor's royal fort, dating to the time of Ahab, 9th century BCE

Around 720 BCE, Kingdom of Israel was destroyed when it was conquered by the Neo-Assyrian Empire, which came to dominate the ancient Near East. Under the Assyrian resettlement policy, a significant portion of the northern Israelite population was exiled to Mesopotamia and replaced by immigrants from the same region. During the same period, and throughout the 7th century BCE, the Kingdom of Judah, now under Assyrian vassalage, experienced a period of prosperity and witnessed a significant population growth. This prosperity continued until the Neo-Assyrian king Sennacherib devastated the region of Judah in response to a rebellion in the area, ultimately halting at Jerusalem. Later in the same century, the Assyrians were defeated by the rising Neo-Babylonian Empire, and Judah became its vassal. In 587 BCE, following a revolt in Judah, the Babylonian king Nebuchadnezzar II besieged and destroyed Jerusalem and the First Temple, putting an end to the kingdom. Judah's population underwent a demographic collapse as a result of deportations to Babylonia, wartime deaths, famine, and the flight of inhabitants abroad.

=== Second Temple period ===
According to the Book of Ezra, the Persian Cyrus the Great ended the Babylonian exile in 538 BCE, the year after he captured Babylon. The exile ended with the return under Zerubbabel the Prince (so called because he was a descendant of the royal line of David) and Joshua the Priest (a descendant of the line of the former High Priests of the Temple) and their construction of the Second Temple circa 521–516 BCE. As part of the Persian Empire, the former Kingdom of Judah became the province of Judah (Yehud Medinata), with a smaller territory and a reduced population.

Judea was under control of the Achaemenids until Alexander the Great conquered the region in 332 BCE. After his death, Judea passed between rival Hellenistic kingdoms; it was firmly held by Ptolemaic Egypt from about 301 BCE and then by the Seleucid Empire from 198 BCE. Seleucid attempts under Antiochus IV to suppress Jewish religious practice provoked the Maccabean Revolt (167–141 BCE), which resulted in an independent Judea; the Jews once again enjoyed political independence from 140 to 63 BCE. The Hasmonean rulers, who descended from the Maccabees, progressively expanded their territories beyond the lands of the historical kingdom of Judah. Under John Hyrcanus, Aristobulus I, and Alexander Jannaeus, the kingdom came to encompass Samaria, Idumaea, Galilee, and parts of Transjordan; during these conquests, the Idumeans, who had infiltrated southern Judea after the destruction of the First Temple, were converted to Judaism en masse. In 63 BCE, the Roman general Pompey intervened in a succession war that had erupted following the death of Salome Alexandra, and made Judea a Roman client state. Rome subsequently installed the Herodian dynasty as vassal kings, with Herod the Great ruling from 37 to 4 BCE; after his death, the kingdom was divided among his sons, and in 6 CE Judea proper was placed under direct Roman administration as the province of Judaea.

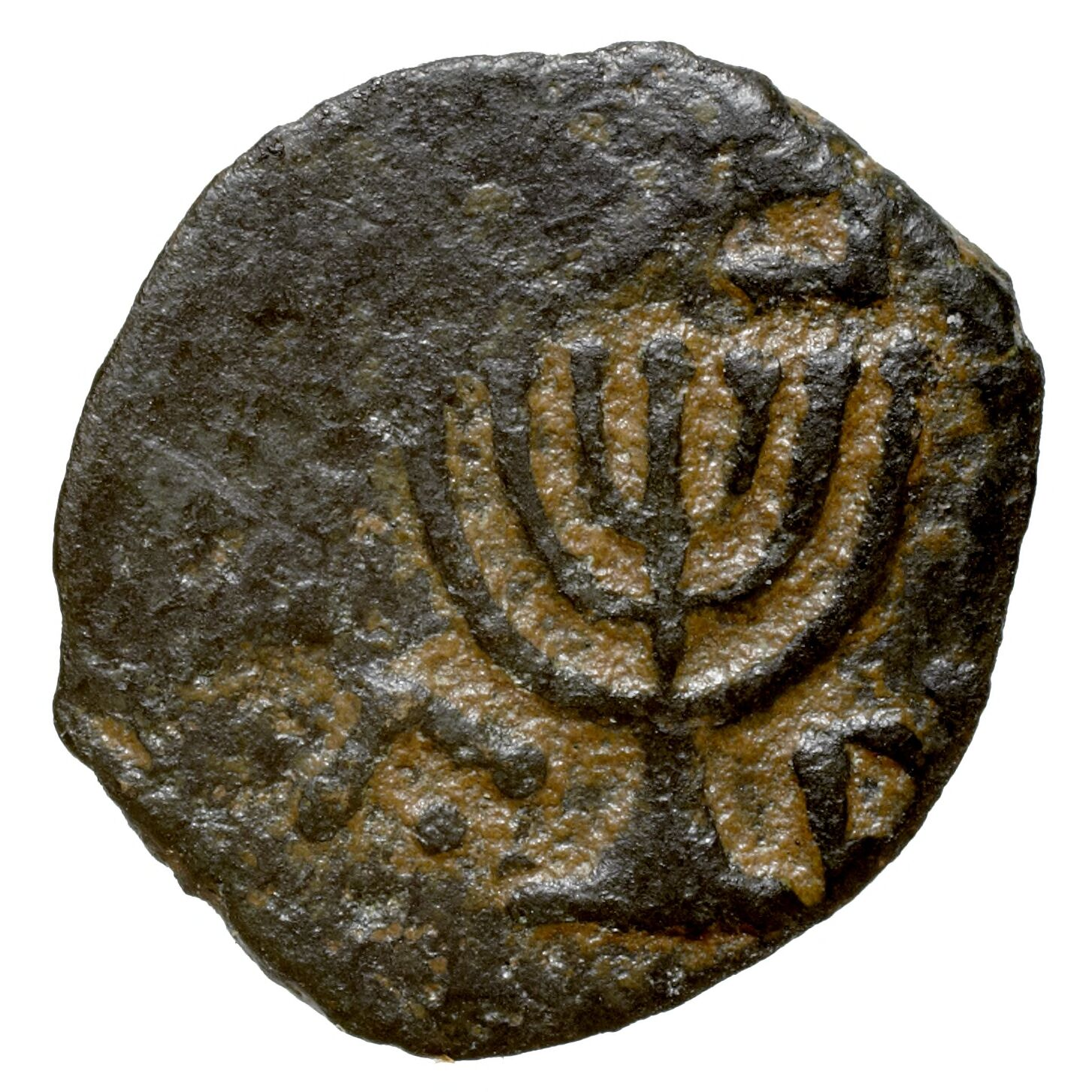
Temple menorah depicted on a coin of the Hasmonean king of Judaea Antigonus II Mattathias

The Jewish–Roman wars, a series of failed uprisings against Roman rule during the first and second centuries CE, had profound and devastating consequences for the Jewish population of Judaea. The First Jewish–Roman War (66–73/74 CE) culminated in the destruction of Jerusalem and the Second Temple, after which the significantly diminished Jewish population was stripped of political autonomy. A few generations later, the Bar Kokhba Revolt (132–136 CE) erupted in response to Roman plans to rebuild Jerusalem as a Roman colony, and, possibly, to restrictions on circumcision. Its violent suppression by the Romans led to the near-total depopulation of Judea, and the demographic and cultural center of Jewish life shifted to Galilee. Jews were subsequently banned from residing in Jerusalem and the surrounding area, and the province of Judaea was renamed Syria Palaestina. These developments effectively ended Jewish efforts to restore political sovereignty in the region for nearly two millennia. Similar upheavals impacted the Jewish communities in the empire's eastern provinces during the Diaspora Revolt (115–117 CE), leading to the near-total destruction of Jewish diaspora communities in Libya, Cyprus and Egypt, including the highly influential community in Alexandria.

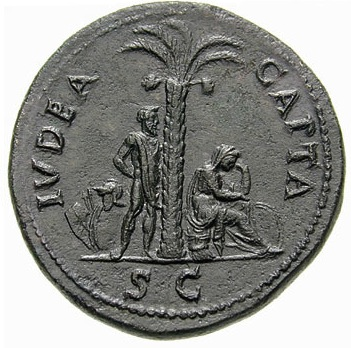
A Roman coin inscribed Ivdaea Capta, or "captive Judea" (71 CE), representing Judea as a seated mourning woman (right), and a Jewish captive with hands tied (left)

The destruction of the Second Temple in 70 CE brought profound changes to Judaism. With the Temple's central place in Jewish worship gone, religious practices shifted towards prayer, Torah study (including Oral Torah), and communal gatherings in synagogues. Judaism also lost much of its sectarian nature. Two of the three main sects that flourished during the late Second Temple period, namely the Sadducees and Essenes, eventually disappeared, while Pharisaic beliefs became the foundational, liturgical, and ritualistic basis of Rabbinic Judaism, which emerged as the prevailing form of Judaism since late antiquity.

=== Babylon and Rome ===
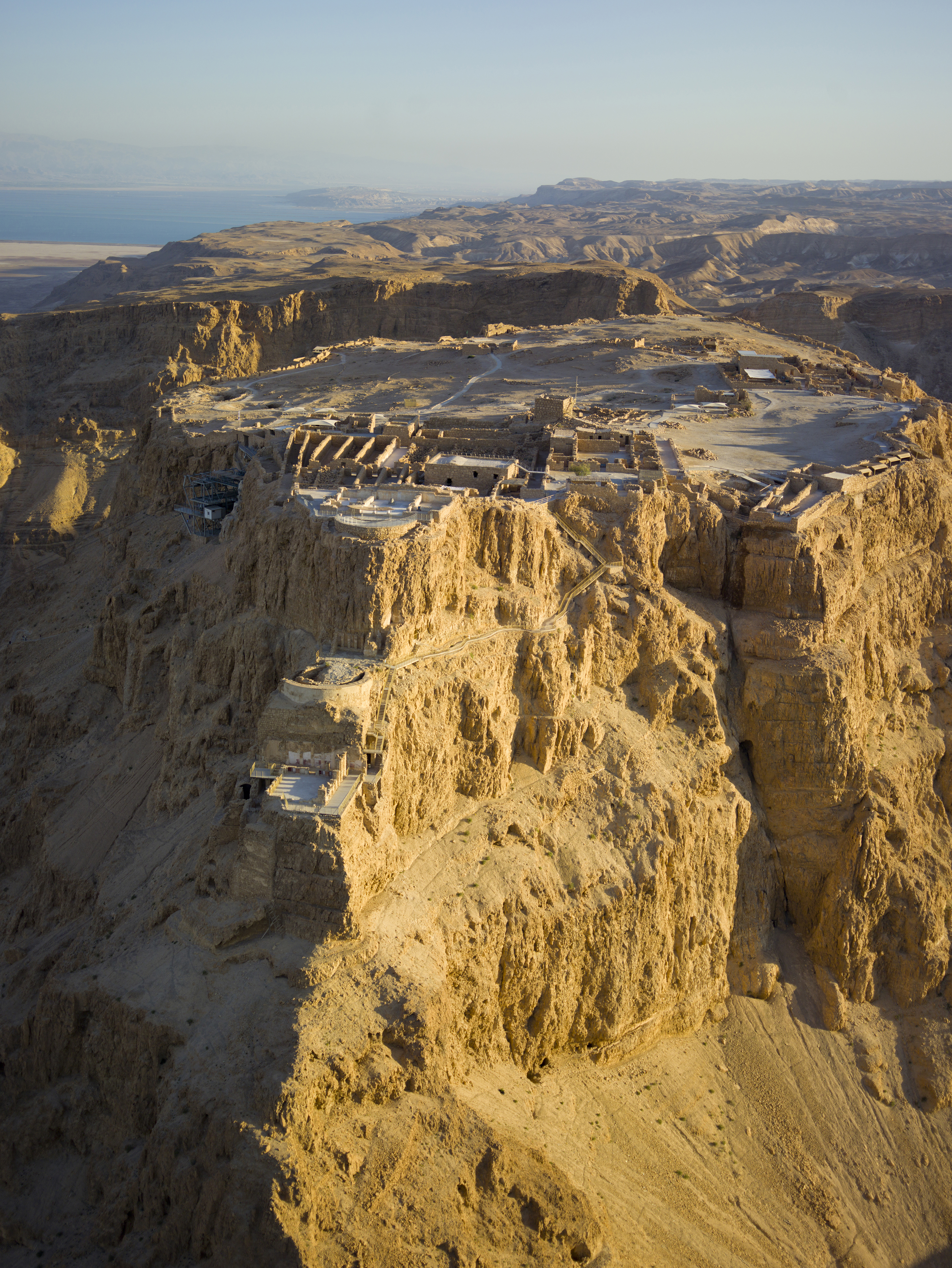
Masada fortress overlooking the Dead Sea, the location of a 1st-century Roman siege

The Jewish diaspora existed well before the destruction of the Second Temple in 70 CE and had been ongoing for centuries, with the dispersal driven by both forced expulsions and voluntary migrations. In Mesopotamia, a testimony to the beginnings of the Jewish community can be found in Joachin's ration tablets, listing provisions allotted to the exiled Judean king and his family by Nebuchadnezzar II, and further evidence are the Al-Yahudu Tablets, dated to the 6th–5th centuries BCE and related to the exiles from Judea arriving after the destruction of the First Temple, though there is ample evidence for the presence of Jews in Babylonia even from 626 BCE. In Egypt, the documents from Elephantine reveal the trials of a community founded by a Persian Jewish garrison at two fortresses on the frontier during the 5th–4th centuries BCE, and according to Josephus the Jewish community in Alexandria existed since the founding of the city in the 4th century BCE by Alexander the Great. By 200 BCE, there were well established Jewish communities both in Egypt and Mesopotamia ("Babylonia" in Jewish sources) and in the two centuries that followed, Jewish populations were also present in Asia Minor, Greece, Macedonia, Cyrene, and, beginning in the middle of the first century BCE, in the city of Rome. Later, in the first centuries CE, as a result of the Jewish–Roman wars, a large number of Jews were taken as captives, sold into slavery, or compelled to flee from the regions affected by the wars, contributing to the formation and expansion of Jewish communities across the Roman Empire as well as in Arabia and Mesopotamia.

After the Bar Kokhba Revolt, the significantly reduced Jewish population in Judaea made efforts to recover from the revolt's devastating effects, but never fully regained its former strength. Between the second and fourth centuries CE, the region of Galilee emerged as the primary center of Jewish life in Syria Palaestina, experiencing both demographic growth and cultural development. It was during this period that two central rabbinic texts, the Mishnah and the Jerusalem Talmud, were composed. The Romans recognized the patriarchs—rabbinic sages such as Judah ha-Nasi—as representatives of the Jewish people, granting them a certain degree of autonomy. However, as the Roman Empire gave way to the Christianized Byzantine Empire under Constantine, Jews began to face persecution by both the Church and imperial authorities, Jews came to be persecuted by the church and the authorities, and many immigrated to communities in the diaspora. By the fourth century CE, Jews are believed to have lost their demographic majority in Syria Palaestina.

The long-established Jewish community of Mesopotamia, which had been living under Parthian and later Sasanian rule, beyond the confines of the Roman Empire, became an important center of Jewish study as Judea's Jewish population declined. Estimates often place the Babylonian Jewish community of the 3rd to 7th centuries at around one million, making it the largest Jewish diaspora community of that period. Under the political leadership of the exilarch, who was regarded as a royal heir of the House of David, this community had an autonomous status and served as a place of refuge for the Jews of Syria Palaestina. A number of significant Talmudic academies, such as the Nehardea, Pumbedita, and Sura academies, were established in Mesopotamia, and many important Amoraim were active there. The Babylonian Talmud, a centerpiece of Jewish religious law, was compiled in Babylonia in the 3rd to 6th centuries.

=== Middle Ages ===
Jewish diaspora communities are generally described to have coalesced into three major ethnic subdivisions according to where their ancestors settled: the Ashkenazim (initially in the Rhineland and France), the Sephardim (initially in the Iberian Peninsula, sometimes includes North Africa), and the Mizrahim (Asia and sometimes includes North Africa). Romaniote Jews, Cochin Jews, Ethiopian Jews also predated the arrival of the Sephardic diaspora.

During the same period, Jewish communities in the Middle East thrived under Islamic rule, especially in cities like Baghdad, Cairo, and Damascus. In Babylonia, from the 7th to 11th centuries, the Pumbedita and Sura academies led the Arab and, to an extent, the entire Jewish world. The deans and students of said academies defined the Geonic period in Jewish history. From the 9th century onward, Jews increasingly became specialized in urban occupations such as trade, finance, and medicine. One explanation attributes this to antisemitic restrictions imposed upon Jews by local rulers. Simon Kuznets argued that urbanization was an internal strategy for maintaining cultural cohesion. Knowledge of Hebrew provided a shared written language across communities with different spoken languages. The high level of literacy among Jewish farmers gave them an advantage in the skilled occupations in expanding urban centers such as Baghdad and by the growth of long-distance trade between Asia, the Muslim world, and western Europe. Following this period were the Rishonim who lived from the 11th to 15th centuries. Like their European counterparts, Jews in the Middle East and North Africa also faced periods of persecution and discriminatory policies, with the Almohad Caliphate in North Africa and Iberia issuing forced conversion decrees, causing Jews such as Maimonides to seek safety in other regions.

Despite experiencing repeated waves of persecution, Ashkenazi Jews in Western Europe worked in a variety of fields, making an impact on their communities' economy and societies. In Francia, for example, figures like Isaac Judaeus and Armentarius occupied prominent social and economic positions. Francia also witnessed the development of a sophisticated tradition of biblical commentary, as exemplified by Rashi and the tosafists. In 1144, the first documented blood libel occurred in Norwich, England, marking an escalation in the pattern of discrimination and violence that Jews had already been subjected to throughout medieval Europe. During the 12th and 13th centuries, Jews faced frequent antisemitic legislation - including laws prescribing distinctive dress - alongside segregation, repeated blood libels, pogroms, and massacres such as the Rhineland Massacres (1066). The Jews of the Holy Roman Empire were designated Servi camerae regis (“servants of the imperial chamber”) by Frederick II, a status that afforded limited protection while simultaneously entangling them in the political struggles between the emperor and the German principalities and cities. Persecution intensified during the Black Death in the mid-14th century, when Jews were accused of poisoning wells and many communities were destroyed. These pressures, combined with major expulsions such as that from England in 1290, gradually pushed Ashkenazi Jewish populations eastward into Poland, Lithuania, and Russia.

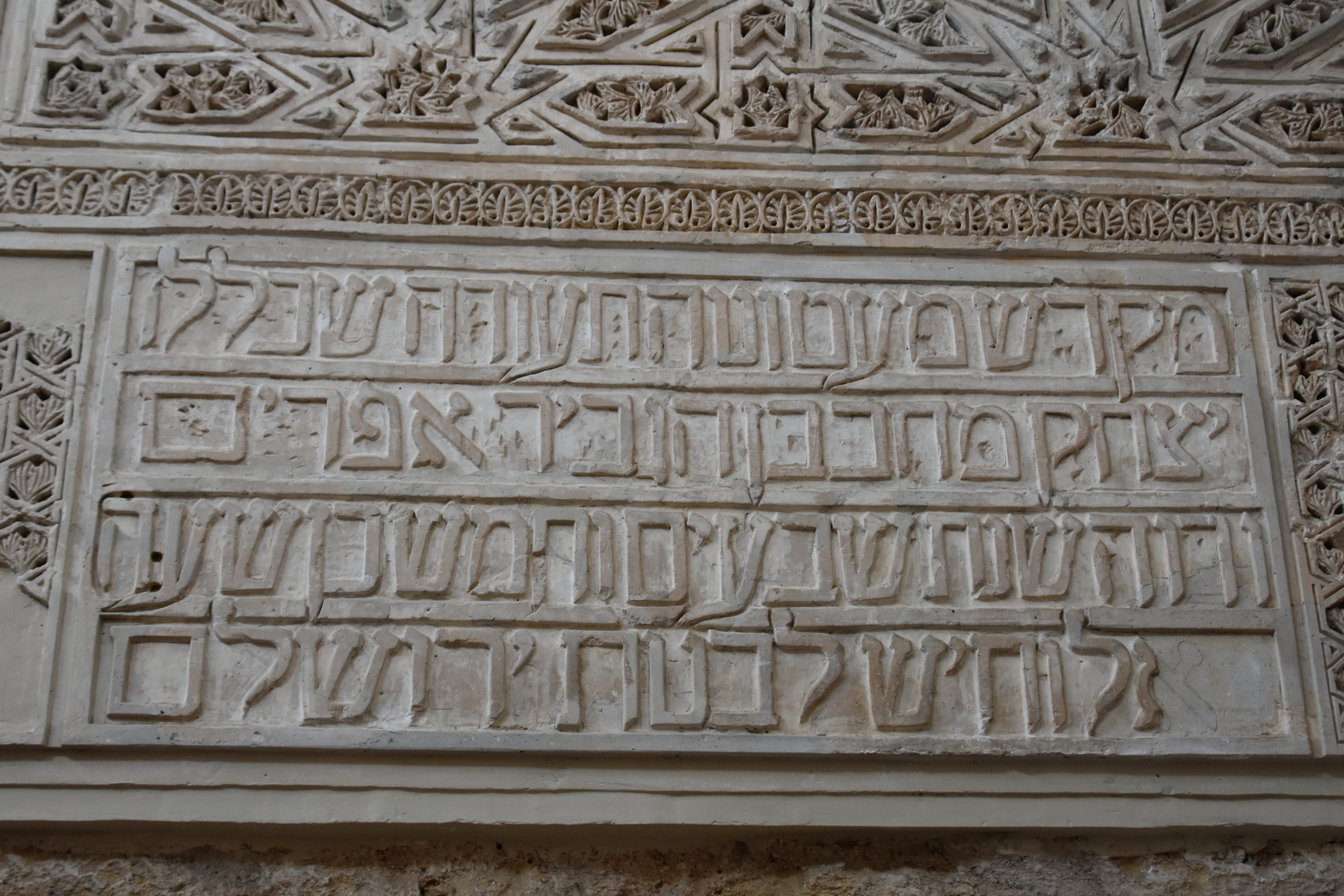
Hebrew inscription in the Córdoba Synagogue, Spain (1315)

One of the largest Jewish communities of the Middle Ages was in the Iberian Peninsula, which for a time contained the largest Jewish population in Europe. Iberian Jewry endured discrimination under the Visigoths but saw its fortunes improve under Umayyad rule and later the Taifa kingdoms. During this period, the Jews of Muslim Spain entered a "Golden Age" marked by achievements in Hebrew poetry and literature, religious scholarship, grammar, medicine and science, with leading figures including Hasdai ibn Shaprut, Judah Halevi, Moses ibn Ezra and Solomon ibn Gabirol. Jews also rose to high office, most notably Samuel ibn Naghrillah, a scholar and poet who served as grand vizier and military commander of Granada. The Golden Age ended with the rise of the radical Almoravid and Almohad dynasties, whose persecutions drove many Jews from Iberia (including Maimonides), together with the advancing Reconquista. In 1391, widespread pogroms swept across Spain, leaving thousands dead and forcing mass conversions. The Spanish Inquisition was later established to pursue, torture and execute conversos who continued to practice Judaism in secret, while public disputations were staged to discredit Judaism. In 1492, after the Reconquista, Isabella I of Castile and Ferdinand II of Aragon decreed the expulsion of all Jews who refused conversion, sending an estimated 200,000 into exile in Portugal, Italy, North Africa, and the Ottoman Empire. In 1497, Portugal's Jews, about 30,000, were formally ordered expelled but instead were forcibly converted to retain their economic role. In 1498, some 3,500 Jews were expelled from Navarre. Many converts outwardly adopted Christianity while secretly preserving Jewish practices, becoming crypto-Jews (also known as marranos or anusim), who remained targets of the various Inquisitions for centuries.

=== Early modern period ===
Following the expulsions from Spain and Portugal in the 1490s, Jewish exiles dispersed across the Mediterranean, Europe, and North Africa. Many settled in the Ottoman Empire—which, replacing the Iberian Peninsula, became home to the world's largest Jewish population—where new communities developed in Anatolia, the Balkans, and the Land of Israel. Cities such as Istanbul and Thessaloniki grew into major Jewish centers, while in 16th-century Safed a flourishing spiritual life took shape. There, Solomon Alkabetz, Moses Cordovero, and Isaac Luria developed influential new schools of Kabbalah, giving powerful impetus to Jewish mysticism, and Joseph Karo composed the Shulchan Aruch, which became a cornerstone of Jewish law. In the 17th century, Portuguese conversos who returned to Judaism and engaged in trade and banking helped establish Amsterdam as a prosperous Jewish center, while also forming communities in cities such as Antwerp and London. This period also witnessed waves of messianic fervor, most notably the rise of the Sabbatean movement in the 1660s, led by Sabbatai Zvi of İzmir, which reverberated throughout the Jewish world.

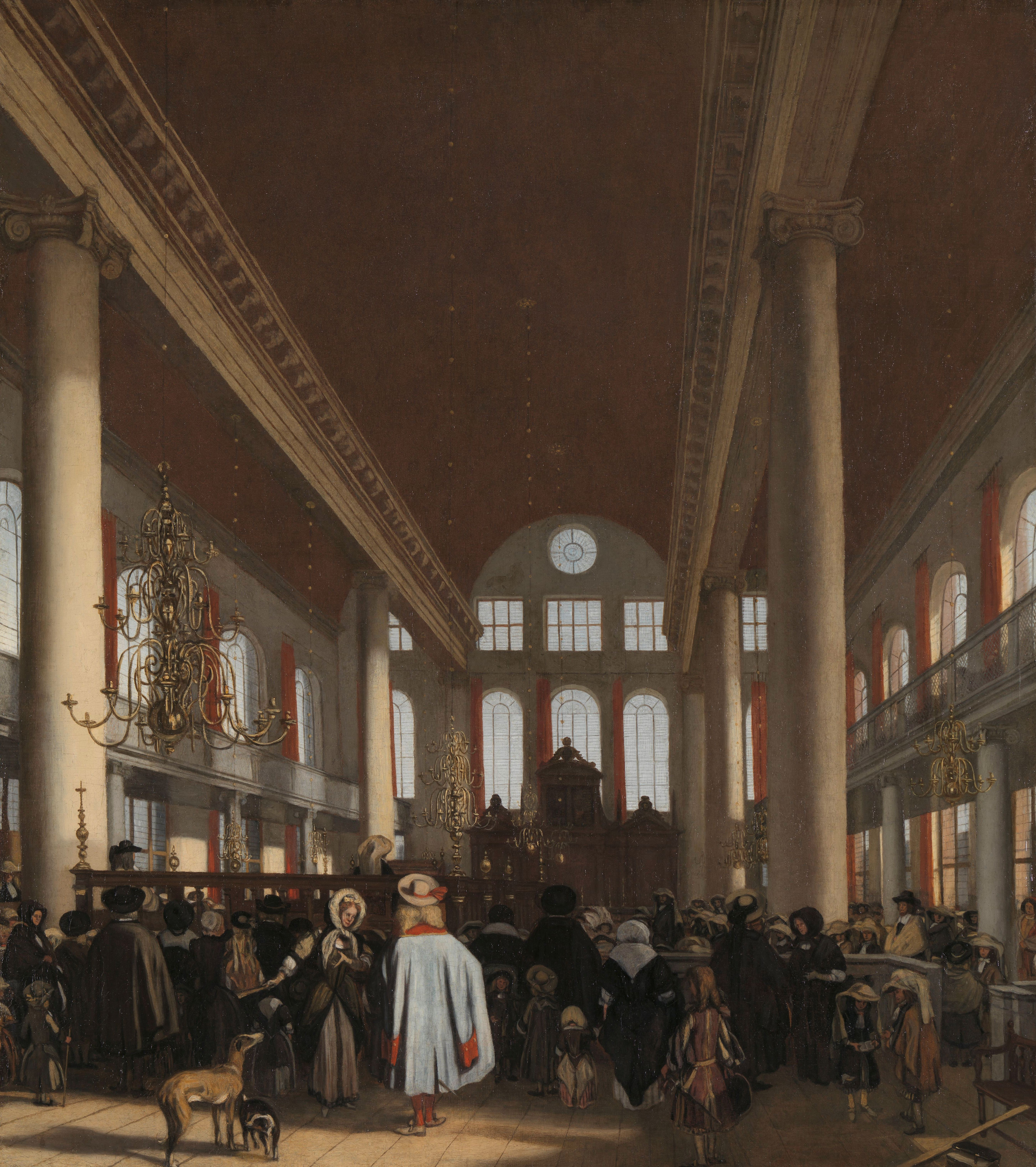
Interior of the Portuguese Synagogue in Amsterdam, painted by Emanuel de Witte, c. 1680, Rijksmuseum

In Eastern Europe, Poland–Lithuania became the principal center of Ashkenazi Jewry, eventually becoming home to the largest Jewish population in the world. Jewish life flourished there in the early modern era, supported by relative stability, economic opportunity, and strong communal institutions. The mid-17th century brought devastation with the Cossack uprisings in Ukraine, which reversed migration flows and sent refugees westward, yet Poland–Lithuania remained the demographic and cultural heartland of Ashkenazic Jewry. Following the partitions of Poland, most of its Jews came under Russian rule and were confined to the "Pale of Settlement." The 18th century also witnessed new religious and intellectual currents. Hasidism, founded by Baal Shem Tov, emphasized mysticism and piety, while its opponents, the Misnagdim ("opponents") led by the Vilna Gaon, defended rabbinic scholarship and tradition.

In Western Europe, during the 1760s and 1770s, the Haskalah (Jewish Enlightenment) emerged in German-speaking lands, where figures such as Moses Mendelssohn promoted secular learning, vernacular literacy, and integration into European society. Elsewhere, Jews began to be re-admitted to Western Europe, including England, where Menasseh ben Israel petitioned Oliver Cromwell for their return.

In the Americas, Jews of Sephardic descent first arrived as conversos in Spanish and Portuguese colonies, where many faced trial by Inquisition tribunals for "judaizing." A more durable presence began in Dutch Brazil, where Jews openly practiced their religion and established the first synagogues in the New World, before the Portuguese reconquest forced their dispersal to Amsterdam, the Caribbean, and North America. Sephardic communities took root in Curaçao, Suriname, Jamaica, and Barbados, later joined by Ashkenazi migrants. In North America, Jews were present from the mid-17th century, with New Amsterdam hosting the first organized congregation in 1654. By the time of the American Revolution, small communities in New York, Newport, Philadelphia, Savannah, and Charleston played an active role in the struggle for independence.

=== Modern period and the State of Israel ===
In the late 19th century, Jews in Western Europe gradually achieved legal emancipation, though social acceptance remained limited by persistent antisemitism and rising nationalism. In Eastern Europe, particularly within the Russian Empire's Pale of Settlement, Jews faced mounting legal restrictions and recurring pogroms. From this environment emerged Zionism, a national revival movement originating in Central and Eastern Europe that sought to re-establish a Jewish polity in the Land of Israel as a means of returning the Jewish people to their ancestral homeland and ending centuries of exile and persecution. This led to waves of Jewish migration to Ottoman Palestine. Theodor Herzl, who is considered the father of political Zionism, offered his vision of a future Jewish state in his 1896 book Der Judenstaat (The Jewish State); a year later, he presided over the First Zionist Congress.

The antisemitism that inflicted Jewish communities in Europe also triggered a mass exodus of 2.8 million Jews to the United States between 1881 and 1924. Despite this, some Jews of Europe and the United States were able to make great achievements in various fields of science and culture. Among the most influential from this period are Albert Einstein in physics, Sigmund Freud in psychology, Franz Kafka in literature, and Irving Berlin in music. Many Nobel Prize winners at this time were Jewish, as is still the case.

Map of the Jewish diaspora: Israel + 1,000,000 + 100,000 + 10,000 + 1,000

When Adolf Hitler and the Nazi Party came to power in Germany in 1933, the situation for Jews deteriorated rapidly as a direct result of Nazi policies. Many Jews fled from Europe to Mandatory Palestine, the United States, and the Soviet Union as a result of racially antisemitic laws, and economic difficulties. World War II started in 1939, and by 1941 Germany occupied much of Europe. Following its invasion of the Soviet Union in 1941, Germany escalated its persecution of Jews into the Final Solution: an extensively organised effort to exterminate all Jews in Europe, implemented through mass shootings, deportations, concentration camps, and death camps. In Poland, three million were murdered in gas chambers in all concentration camps combined, with one million at the Auschwitz camp complex alone. In total, approximately six million Jews were systemically murdered in the genocide known as the Holocaust, by both the German state and other governments allied to or occupied by the Nazis. Jews actively resisted this genocide militantly, such as in the Warsaw Ghetto Uprising.

During this period, many Jews emigrated to Mandatory Palestine. In 1944, the Jewish insurgency in Mandatory Palestine began. On 14 May 1948, at the end of the mandate, David Ben-Gurion declared the creation of the State of Israel, a "Jewish and democratic state". The 1948 Arab-Israeli Wars followed. In 1949, the war ended, and Israel began building its state and absorbing waves of Aliyah, granting citizenship to Jews worldwide through the Law of Return passed in 1950. However, ongoing Arab–Israeli conflicts continued.

== Culture ==
=== Religion ===
The Jewish people and the religion of Judaism are strongly interrelated. Converts to Judaism have a status within the Jewish people equal to those born into it. However, converts who go on to practice no Judaism are likely to be viewed with skepticism. Mainstream Judaism does not proselytize, and conversion is considered a difficult task. A significant portion of conversions are undertaken by children of mixed marriages, or would-be or current spouses of Jews.

The Hebrew Bible, a religious interpretation of the traditions and early history of the Jews, established the first of the Abrahamic religions, which are now practiced by 54 percent of the world. Judaism guides its adherents in both practice and belief, and has been called not only a religion, but also a "way of life," which has made drawing a clear distinction between Judaism, Jewish culture, and Jewish identity rather difficult. Throughout history, in eras and places as diverse as the ancient Hellenic world, in Europe before and after The Age of Enlightenment (see Haskalah), in Islamic Spain and Portugal, in North Africa and the Middle East, India, China, or the contemporary United States and Israel, cultural phenomena have developed that are in some sense characteristically Jewish without being at all specifically religious. Some factors in this come from within Judaism, others from the interaction of Jews or specific communities of Jews with their surroundings, and still others from the inner social and cultural dynamics of the community, as opposed to from the religion itself. This phenomenon has led to considerably different Jewish cultures unique to their own communities.

=== Languages ===
Hebrew is the liturgical language of Judaism (termed lashon ha-kodesh, "the holy tongue"), the language in which most of the Hebrew scriptures (Tanakh) were composed, and the daily speech of the Jewish people for centuries. By the 5th century BCE, Aramaic, a closely related tongue, joined Hebrew as the spoken language in Judea. By the 3rd century BCE, some Jews of the diaspora were speaking Greek. Others, such as in the Jewish communities of Asoristan, known to Jews as Babylonia, were speaking Hebrew and Aramaic, the languages of the Babylonian Talmud. Dialects of these same languages were also used by the Jews of Syria Palaestina at that time.

For centuries, Jews worldwide have spoken the local or dominant languages of the regions they migrated to, often developing distinctive dialectal forms or branches that became independent languages. Yiddish is the Judaeo-German language developed by Ashkenazi Jews who migrated to Central Europe. Ladino is the Judaeo-Spanish language developed by Sephardic Jews who migrated to the Iberian Peninsula. Due to many factors, including the impact of the Holocaust on European Jewry, the Jewish exodus from Arab and Muslim countries, and widespread emigration from other Jewish communities around the world, ancient and distinct Jewish languages of several communities, including Judaeo-Georgian, Judaeo-Arabic, Judeo-Persian, Judeo-Berber, Krymchak, Judeo-Malayalam and many others, have largely fallen out of use.

For over sixteen centuries, Hebrew was used almost exclusively as a liturgical language, and as the language in which most books had been written on Judaism, with a few speaking only Hebrew on the Sabbath. Hebrew was revived as a spoken language by Eliezer ben Yehuda, who arrived in Palestine in 1881. It had not been used as a mother tongue since Tannaic times. Modern Hebrew is designated as the "State language" of Israel.

Despite efforts to revive Hebrew as the language of communication of the Jewish people, fluency in Hebrew is not widely held among Jews of the diaspora, and English has emerged as the lingua franca of Jews worldwide. Although many Jews once had sufficient knowledge of Hebrew to study the classic literature, and Jewish languages like Yiddish and Ladino were commonly used as recently as the early 20th century, most Jews lack such knowledge today and English has by and large superseded most Jewish vernaculars. The three most commonly spoken languages among Jews today are Hebrew, English, and Russian. Some Romance languages, particularly French and Spanish, are also widely used. Yiddish has been spoken by more Jews in history than any other language, but it is far less used today following the Holocaust and the adoption of Modern Hebrew by the Zionist movement and the State of Israel. In some places, the mother language of the Jewish community differs from that of the general population or the dominant group. For example, in Quebec, the Ashkenazic majority has adopted English, while the Sephardic minority uses French as its primary language. Similarly, South African Jews adopted English rather than Afrikaans. Due to both Czarist and Soviet policies, Russian has superseded Yiddish as the language of Russian Jews, but these policies have also affected neighboring communities. Today, Russian is the first language for many Jewish communities in a number of Post-Soviet states, such as Ukraine and Uzbekistan, as well as for Ashkenazic Jews in Azerbaijan, Georgia, and Tajikistan. Although communities in North Africa today are small and dwindling, Jews there had shifted from a multilingual group to a monolingual one (or nearly so), speaking French in Algeria, Morocco, and the city of Tunis, while most North Africans continue to use Arabic or Berber as their mother tongue.

=== Leadership ===
There is no single governing body for the Jewish community, nor is there a single authority responsible for religious doctrine. Instead, a variety of secular and religious institutions at the local, national, and international levels lead various parts of the Jewish community on a variety of issues. Today, many countries have a Chief Rabbi who serves as a representative of that country's Jewry. Although many Hasidic Jews follow a certain hereditary Hasidic dynasty, there is no one commonly accepted leader of all Hasidic Jews. Many Jews believe that the Messiah will act as a unifying leader for Jews and the entire world.

=== Theories on ancient Jewish national identity ===
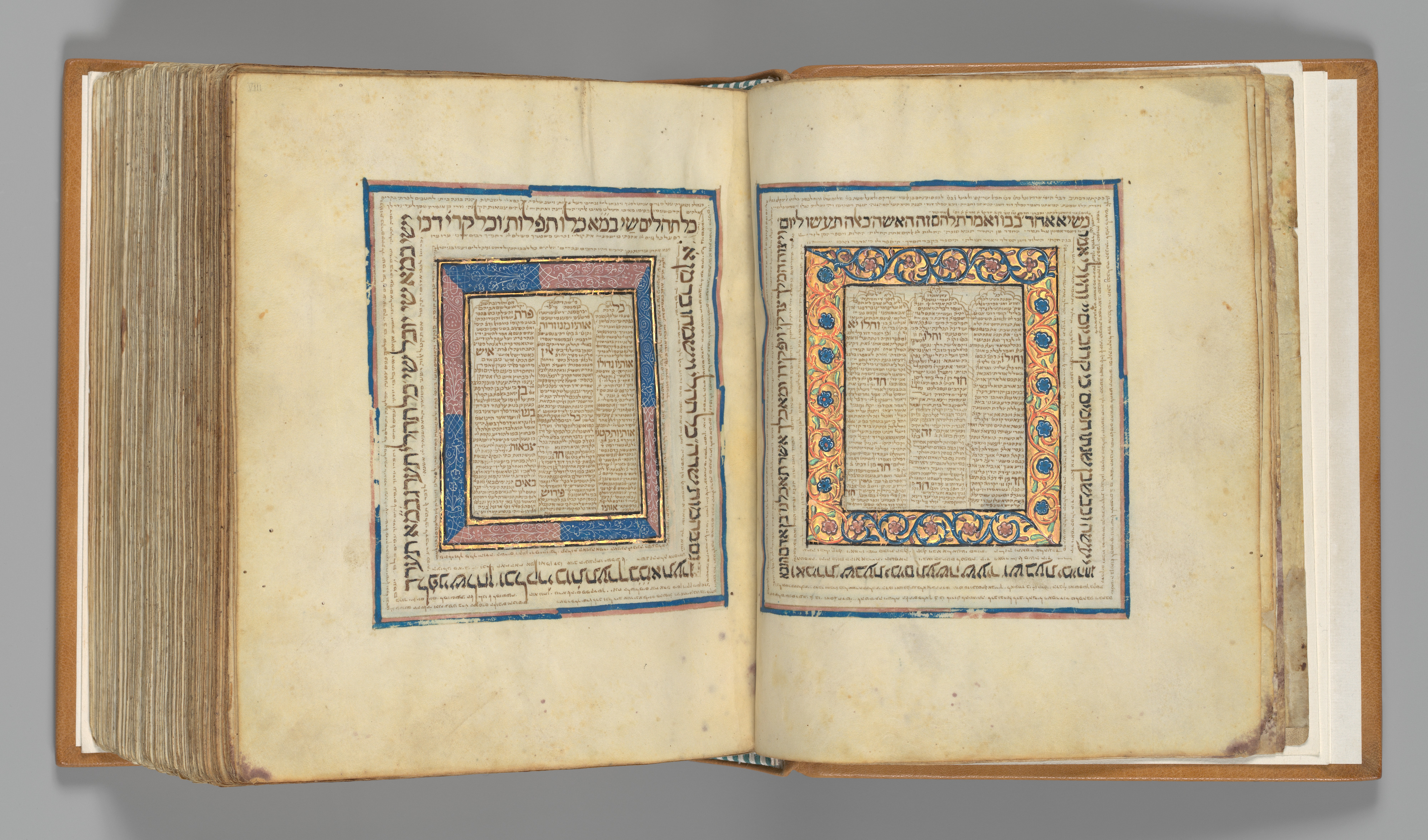
Bible manuscript in Hebrew, 14th century. Hebrew language and alphabet were the cornerstones of the Jewish national identity in antiquity.

A number of modern scholars of nationalism support the existence of Jewish national identity in antiquity. One of them is David Goodblatt, who generally believes in the existence of nationalism before the modern period. In his view, the Bible, the parabiblical literature, and Jewish national history provide the basis for a Jewish collective identity. Although many of the ancient Jews were illiterate (as were their neighbors), their national narrative was reinforced through public readings. The Hebrew language also constructed and preserved national identity. Although it was not widely spoken after the 5th century BCE, Goodblatt states:

the mere presence of the language in spoken or written form could invoke the concept of a Jewish national identity. Even if one knew no Hebrew or was illiterate, one could recognize that a group of signs was in Hebrew script. ... It was the language of the Israelite ancestors, the national literature, and the national religion. As such it was inseparable from the national identity. Indeed its mere presence in visual or aural medium could invoke that identity.

Anthony D. Smith, an historical sociologist considered one of the founders of the field of nationalism studies, wrote that the Jews of the late Second Temple period provide "a closer approximation to the ideal type of the nation [...] than perhaps anywhere else in the ancient world." He adds that this observation "must make us wary of pronouncing too readily against the possibility of the nation, and even a form of religious nationalism, before the onset of modernity." Smith located the formation of a Jewish nation as early as the 7th century BCE, under kings such as Hezekiah and Josiah, but argues that Jewish nationalism only emerged with the Zealots and during the Bar Kokhba Revolt. Agreeing with Smith, Goodblatt suggests omitting the qualifier "religious" from Smith's definition of ancient Jewish nationalism, noting that, according to Smith, a religious component in national memories and culture is common even in the modern era. This view is echoed by political scientist Tom Garvin, who writes that "something strangely like modern nationalism is documented for many peoples in medieval times and in classical times as well," citing the ancient Jews as one of several "obvious examples", alongside the classical Greeks and the Gaulish and British Celts.

Fergus Millar suggests that the sources of Jewish national identity and their early nationalist movements in the first and second centuries CE included several key elements: the Bible as both a national history and legal source, the Hebrew language as a national language, a system of law, and social institutions such as schools, synagogues, and Sabbath worship. Adrian Hastings argued that Jews are the "true proto-nation", that through the model of ancient Israel found in the Hebrew Bible, provided the world with the original concept of nationhood which later influenced Christian nations. However, following Jerusalem's destruction in the first century CE, Jews ceased to be a political entity and did not resemble a traditional nation-state for almost two millennia. Despite this, they maintained their national identity through collective memory, religion and sacred texts, even without land or political power, and remained a nation rather than just an ethnic group, eventually leading to the rise of Zionism and the establishment of Israel.

Steven Weitzman suggests that Jewish nationalist sentiment in antiquity was encouraged because, under foreign rule (Persians, Greeks, Romans), Jews could claim to be an ancient nation. This claim was based on the preservation and reverence of their scriptures, the Hebrew language, the Temple and priesthood, and other traditions of their ancestors. Doron Mendels further observes that the Hasmonean kingdom, one of the few examples of indigenous statehood at its time, significantly reinforced Jewish national consciousness. The memory of this period of independence contributed to the persistent efforts to revive Jewish sovereignty in Judea, leading to the major revolts against Roman rule in the 1st and 2nd centuries CE.

== Demographics ==
=== Ethnic divisions ===
Within the world's Jewish population there are distinct ethnic divisions, most of which are primarily the result of geographic branching from an originating Israelite population, and subsequent independent evolutions. An array of Jewish communities was established by Jewish settlers in various places around the Old World, often at great distances from one another, resulting in effective and often long-term isolation. During the millennia of the Jewish diaspora the communities would develop under the influence of their local environments: political, cultural, natural, and populational. Today, manifestations of these differences among the Jews can be observed in Jewish cultural expressions of each community, including Jewish linguistic diversity, culinary preferences, liturgical practices, religious interpretations, as well as degrees and sources of genetic admixture.

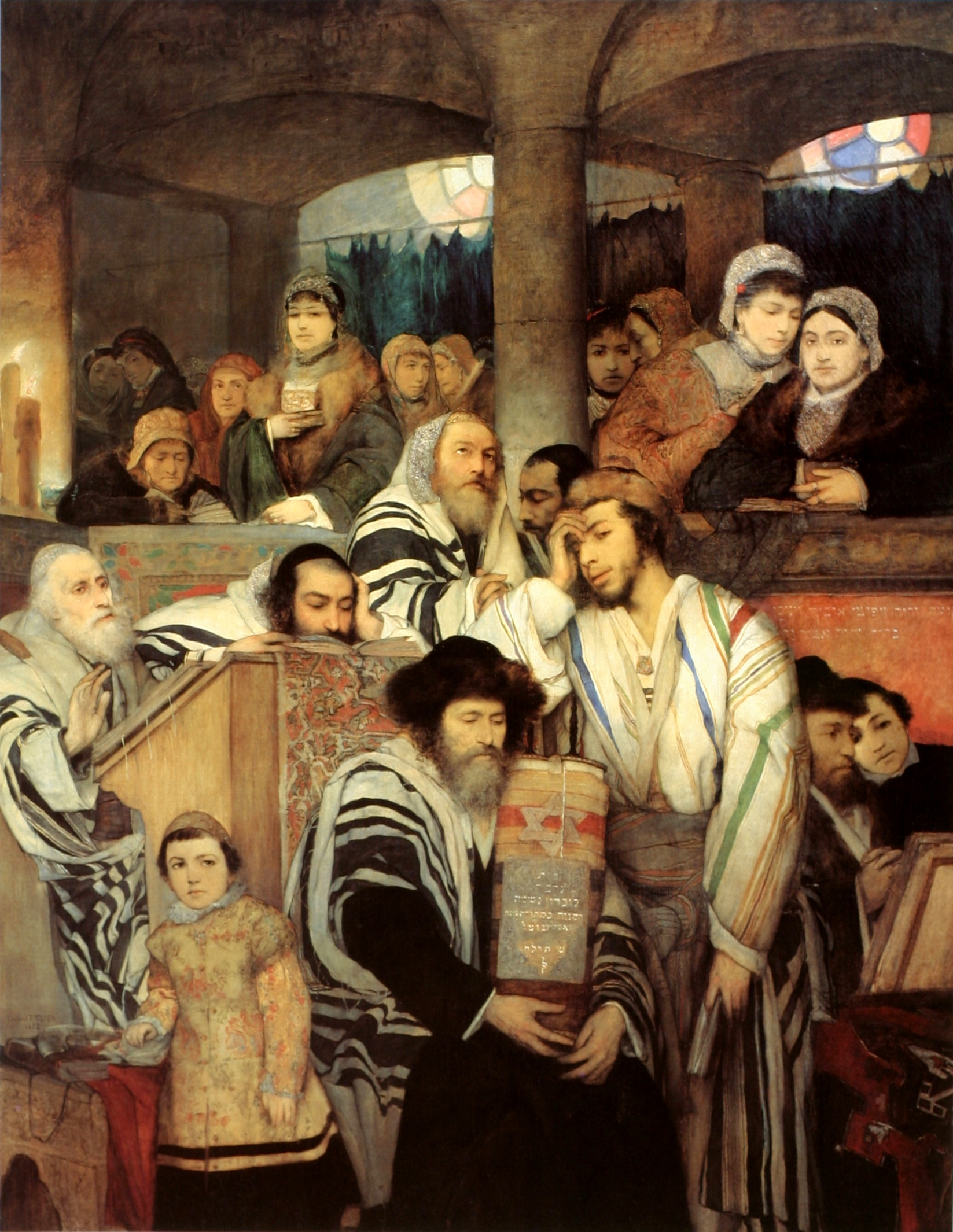
Maurycy Gottlieb's 1878 painting of Ashkenazi Jews praying in synagogue on Yom Kippur.

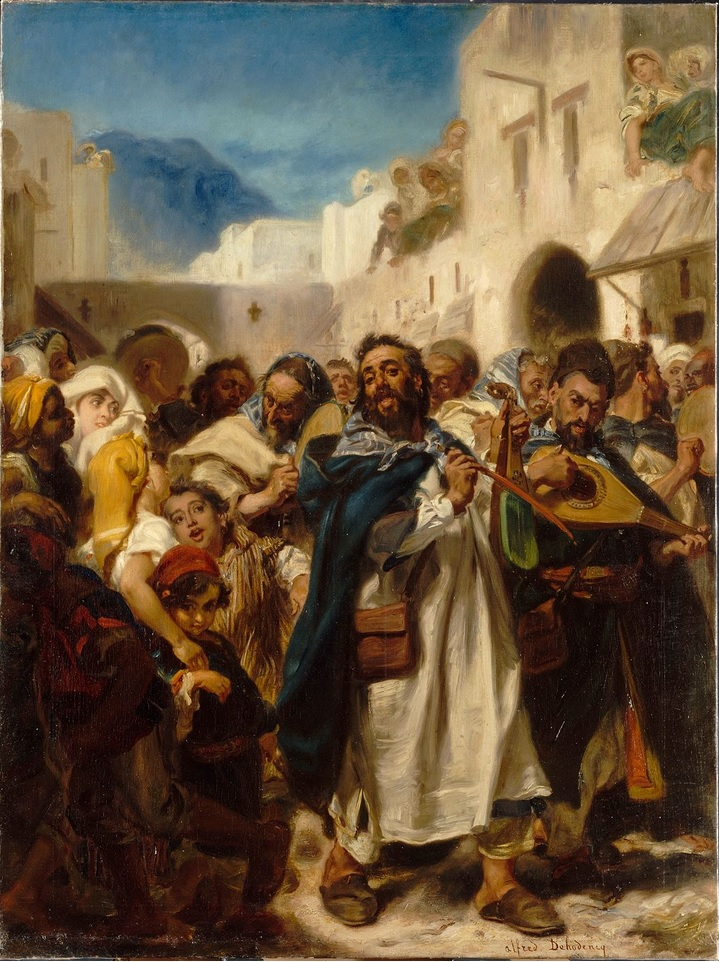
Sephardic Jewish festival in Tétouan, Morocco, Alfred Dehodencq, 1865, Paris Museum of Jewish Art and History

Jews are often identified as belonging to one of two major groups: the Ashkenazim and the Sephardim. Ashkenazim are so named in reference to their geographical origins (their ancestors' culture coalesced in the Rhineland, an area historically referred to by Jews as Ashkenaz). Similarly, Sephardim (Sefarad meaning "Spain" in Hebrew) are named in reference their origins in Iberia. The diverse groups of Jews of the Middle East and North Africa are often collectively referred to as Sephardim together with Sephardim proper for liturgical reasons having to do with their prayer rites. A common term for many of these non-Spanish Jews who are sometimes still broadly grouped as Sephardim is Mizrahim (lit. 'easterners' in Hebrew). Nevertheless, Mizrahis and Sepharadim are usually ethnically distinct.

Smaller groups include, but are not restricted to, Indian Jews such as the Bene Israel, Bnei Menashe, Cochin Jews, and Bene Ephraim; the Romaniotes of Greece; the Italian Jews ("Italkim" or "Bené Roma"); the Teimanim from Yemen; various African Jews, including most numerously the Beta Israel of Ethiopia; and Chinese Jews, most notably the Kaifeng Jews, as well as various other distinct but now almost extinct communities.

The divisions between all these groups are approximate and their boundaries are not always clear. The Mizrahim for example, are a heterogeneous collection of North African, Central Asian, Caucasian, and Middle Eastern Jewish communities that are no closer related to each other than they are to any of the earlier mentioned Jewish groups. In modern usage, however, the Mizrahim are sometimes termed Sephardi due to similar styles of liturgy, despite independent development from Sephardim proper. Thus, among Mizrahim there are Egyptian Jews, Iraqi Jews, Lebanese Jews, Kurdish Jews, Moroccan Jews, Libyan Jews, Syrian Jews, Bukharian Jews, Mountain Jews, Georgian Jews, Iranian Jews, Afghan Jews, and various others. The Teimanim from Yemen are sometimes included, although their style of liturgy is unique and they differ in respect to the admixture found among them to that found in Mizrahim. In addition, there is a differentiation made between Sephardi migrants who established themselves in the Middle East and North Africa after the expulsion of the Jews from Spain and Portugal in the 1490s and the pre-existing Jewish communities in those regions.

Ashkenazi Jews represent the bulk of modern Jewry, with at least 70 percent of Jews worldwide (and up to 90 percent prior to World War II and the Holocaust). As a result of their emigration from Europe, Ashkenazim also represent the overwhelming majority of Jews in the New World continents, in countries such as the United States, Canada, Argentina, Australia, Brazil, and Uruguay. In France, the immigration of Jews from Algeria (Sephardim) has led them to outnumber the Ashkenazim. Only in Israel is the Jewish population representative of all groups, a melting pot independent of each group's proportion within the overall world Jewish population.

=== Genetic studies ===
Y DNA studies tend to imply a small number of founders in an old population whose members parted and followed different migration paths. In most Jewish populations, these male line ancestors appear to have been mainly Middle Eastern. For example, Ashkenazi Jews share more common paternal lineages with other Jewish and Middle Eastern groups than with non-Jewish populations in areas where Jews lived in Eastern Europe, Germany, and the French Rhine Valley. This is consistent with Jewish traditions in placing most Jewish paternal origins in the region of the Middle East.

Conversely, the maternal lineages of Jewish populations, studied by looking at mitochondrial DNA, are generally more heterogeneous. Scholars such as Harry Ostrer and Raphael Falk believe this indicates that many Jewish males found new mates from European and other communities in the places where they migrated in the diaspora after fleeing ancient Israel. In contrast, Behar has found evidence that about 40 percent of Ashkenazi Jews originate maternally from just four female founders, who were of Middle Eastern origin. The populations of Sephardi and Mizrahi Jewish communities "showed no evidence for a narrow founder effect." Subsequent studies carried out by Feder et al. confirmed the large portion of non-local maternal origin among Ashkenazi Jews. Reflecting on their findings related to the maternal origin of Ashkenazi Jews, the authors conclude, "Clearly, the differences between Jews and non-Jews are far larger than those observed among the Jewish communities. Hence, differences between the Jewish communities can be overlooked when non-Jews are included in the comparisons." However, a 2025 genetic study on the Ashkenazi Jewish founder population supports the presence of a substantial Near Eastern component in the maternal lineages. Analyses of mitochondrial DNA (mtDNA) indicate that the core founder lineages, estimated at around 54, likely originated from the Near East, with these founder signatures appearing in multiple copies across the population. While later admixture introduced additional mtDNA lineages, these absorbed lineages are distinguishable from the original founders. The findings are consistent with genome-wide Identity-by-Descent and Lineage Extinction analyses, reinforcing the Near Eastern origin of the Ashkenazi maternal founders. A study showed that 7% of Ashkenazi Jews have the haplogroup G2c, which is mainly found in Pashtuns and on lower scales all major Jewish groups, Palestinians, Syrians, and Lebanese.

Studies of autosomal DNA, which look at the entire DNA mixture, have become increasingly important as the technology develops. They show that Jewish populations have tended to form relatively closely related groups in independent communities, with most in a community sharing significant ancestry in common. For Jewish populations of the diaspora, the genetic composition of Ashkenazi, Sephardic, and Mizrahi Jewish populations show a predominant amount of shared Middle Eastern ancestry. According to Behar, the most parsimonious explanation for this shared Middle Eastern ancestry is that it is "consistent with the historical formulation of the Jewish people as descending from ancient Hebrew and Israelite residents of the Levant" and "the dispersion of the people of ancient Israel throughout the Old World". North African, Italian and others of Iberian origin show variable frequencies of admixture with non-Jewish historical host populations among the maternal lines. In the case of Ashkenazi and Sephardi Jews (in particular Moroccan Jews), who are closely related, the source of non-Jewish admixture is mainly Southern European, while Mizrahi Jews show evidence of admixture with other Middle Eastern populations. The 2010 study by Avshalom Zoossmann-Diskin analyzed sex chromosomes and seventeen autosomal markers, determining that Eastern European Jews are closer genetically to modern Italians, and other Europeans than to other Jewish populations. A 2001 study found that Jews were more closely related to groups of the Fertile Crescent (Kurds, Turks, and Armenians) than to their Arab neighbors, whose genetic signature was found in geographic patterns reflective of Islamic conquests.

The studies also show that Sephardic Bnei Anusim (descendants of the "anusim" who were forced to convert to Catholicism), which comprise up to 19.8 percent of the population of today's Iberia (Spain and Portugal) and at least 10 percent of the population of Ibero-America (Hispanic America and Brazil), have Sephardic Jewish ancestry within the last few centuries. The Bene Israel and Cochin Jews of India, Beta Israel of Ethiopia, and a portion of the Lemba people of Southern Africa, despite more closely resembling the local populations of their native countries, have also been thought to have some more remote ancient Jewish ancestry. Views on the Lemba have changed and genetic Y-DNA analyses in the 2000s have established a partially Middle-Eastern origin for a portion of the male Lemba population but have been unable to narrow this down further.

=== Population centers ===
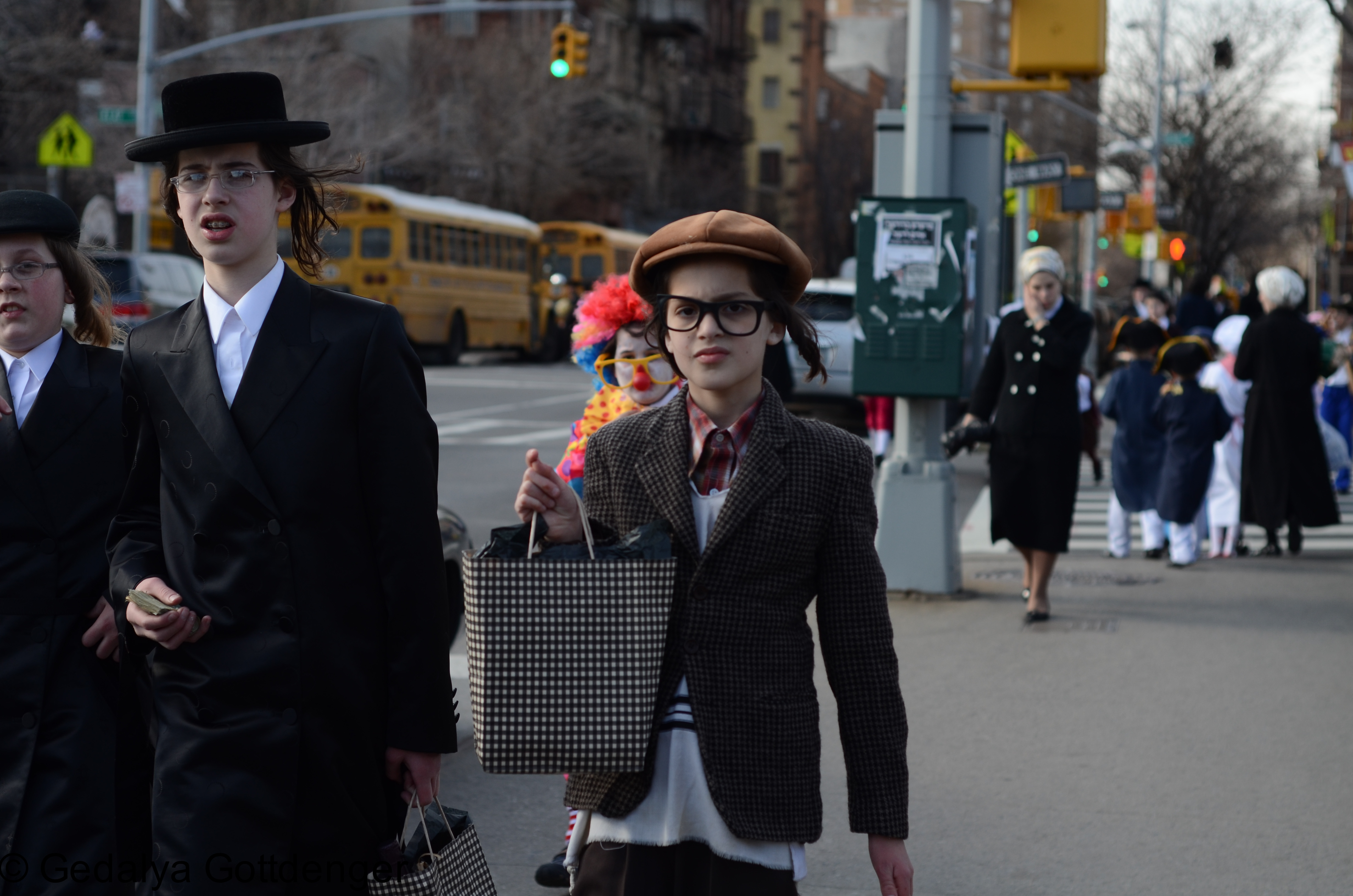
New York City is home to 960,000 Jews, making it the largest Jewish community outside of Israel.

Although historically, Jews have been found all over the world, in the decades since World War II and the establishment of Israel, they have increasingly concentrated in a small number of countries. In 2021, Israel and the United States together accounted for over 85 percent of the global Jewish population, with approximately 45.3% and 39.6% of the world's Jews, respectively. More than half (51.2%) of world Jewry resides in just ten metropolitan areas. As of 2021, these ten areas were Tel Aviv, New York, Jerusalem, Haifa, Los Angeles, Miami, Philadelphia, Paris, Washington, and Chicago. The Tel Aviv metro area has the highest percent of Jews among the total population (94.8%), followed by Jerusalem (72.3%), Haifa (73.1%), and Beersheba (60.4%), the balance mostly being Israeli Arabs. Outside Israel, the highest percent of Jews in a metropolitan area was in New York (10.8%), followed by Miami (8.7%), Philadelphia (6.8%), San Francisco (5.1%), Washington (4.7%), Los Angeles (4.7%), Toronto (4.5%), and Baltimore (4.1%).

As of 2010, there were nearly 14 million Jews around the world, roughly 0.2% of the world's population at the time. According to the 2007 estimates of The Jewish People Policy Planning Institute, the world's Jewish population is 13.2 million. This statistic incorporates both practicing Jews affiliated with synagogues and the Jewish community, and approximately 4.5 million unaffiliated and secular Jews.

According to Sergio Della Pergola, a demographer of the Jewish population, in 2021 there were about 6.8 million Jews in Israel, 6 million in the United States, and 2.3 million in the rest of the world.

==== Israel ====
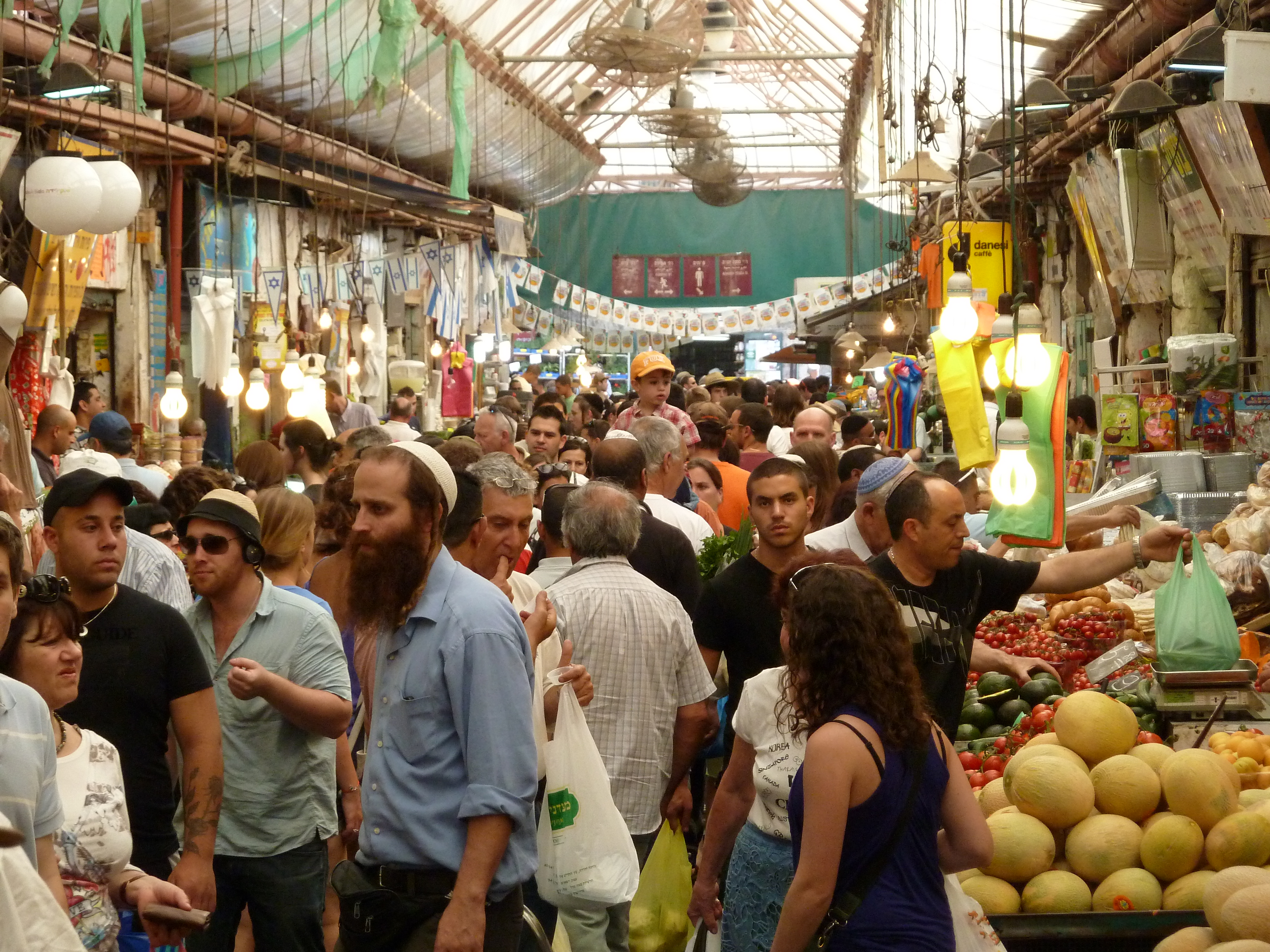
Jewish people in Jerusalem

Israel, the Jewish nation-state, is the only country in which Jews make up a majority of the citizens. Israel was established as an independent democratic and Jewish state on 14 May 1948. Of the 120 members in its parliament, the Knesset, as of 2016, 14 members of the Knesset are Arab citizens of Israel (not including the Druze), most representing Arab political parties. One of Israel's Supreme Court judges is also an Arab citizen of Israel.

Between 1948 and 1958, the Jewish population rose from 800,000 to two million. Currently, Jews account for 75.4 percent of the Israeli population, or 6 million people. The early years of the State of Israel were marked by the mass immigration of Holocaust survivors in the aftermath of the Holocaust and Jews fleeing Arab lands. Israel also has a large population of Ethiopian Jews, many of whom were airlifted to Israel in the late 1980s and early 1990s. Between 1974 and 1979 nearly 227,258 immigrants arrived in Israel, about half being from the Soviet Union. This period also saw an increase in immigration to Israel from Western Europe, Latin America, and North America.

A trickle of immigrants from other communities has also arrived, including Indian Jews and others, as well as some descendants of Ashkenazi Holocaust survivors who had settled in countries such as the United States, Argentina, Australia, Chile, Uruguay and South Africa. Some Jews have emigrated from Israel elsewhere, because of economic problems or disillusionment with political conditions and the continuing Arab–Israeli conflict. Jewish Israeli emigrants are known as yordim.

==== Diaspora (outside Israel) ====
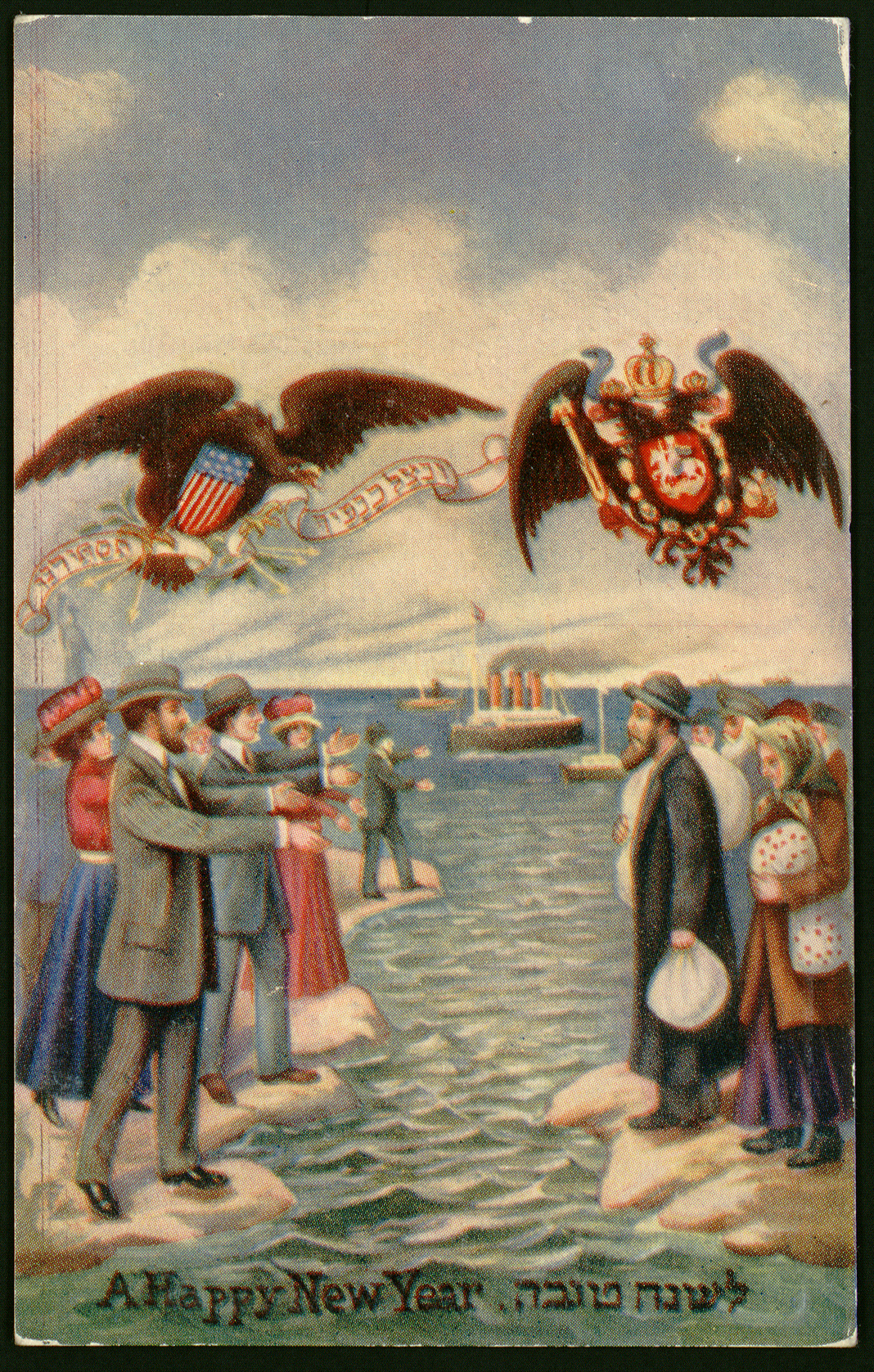
In this Rosh Hashana greeting card from the early 1900s, Russian Jews, packs in hand, gaze at the American relatives beckoning them to the United States. Over two million Jews fled the pogroms of the Russian Empire to the safety of the U.S. between 1881 and 1924.

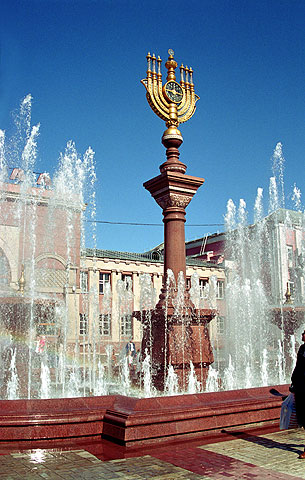
A menorah dominating the main square in Birobidzhan. An estimated 70,000 Jews live in Siberia.

The waves of immigration to the United States and elsewhere at the turn of the 19th century, the founding of Zionism and later events, including pogroms in Imperial Russia (mostly within the Pale of Settlement in present-day Ukraine, Moldova, Belarus and eastern Poland), the massacre of European Jewry during the Holocaust, and the founding of the state of Israel, with the subsequent Jewish exodus from Arab lands, all resulted in substantial shifts in the population centers of world Jewry by the end of the 20th century.

More than half of the Jews live in the Diaspora (see Population table). Currently, the largest Jewish community outside Israel, and either the largest or second-largest Jewish community in the world, is located in the United States, with 6 million to 7.5 million Jews by various estimates. Elsewhere in the Americas, there are also large Jewish populations in Canada (315,000), Argentina (180,000–300,000), and Brazil (196,000–600,000), and smaller populations in Mexico, Uruguay, Venezuela, Chile, Colombia and several other countries (see History of the Jews in Latin America). According to a 2010 Pew Research Center study, about 470,000 people of Jewish heritage live in Latin America and the Caribbean. Demographers disagree on whether the United States has a larger Jewish population than Israel, with many maintaining that Israel surpassed the United States in Jewish population during the 2000s, while others maintain that the United States still has the largest Jewish population in the world. Currently, a major national Jewish population survey is planned to ascertain whether or not Israel has overtaken the United States in Jewish population.

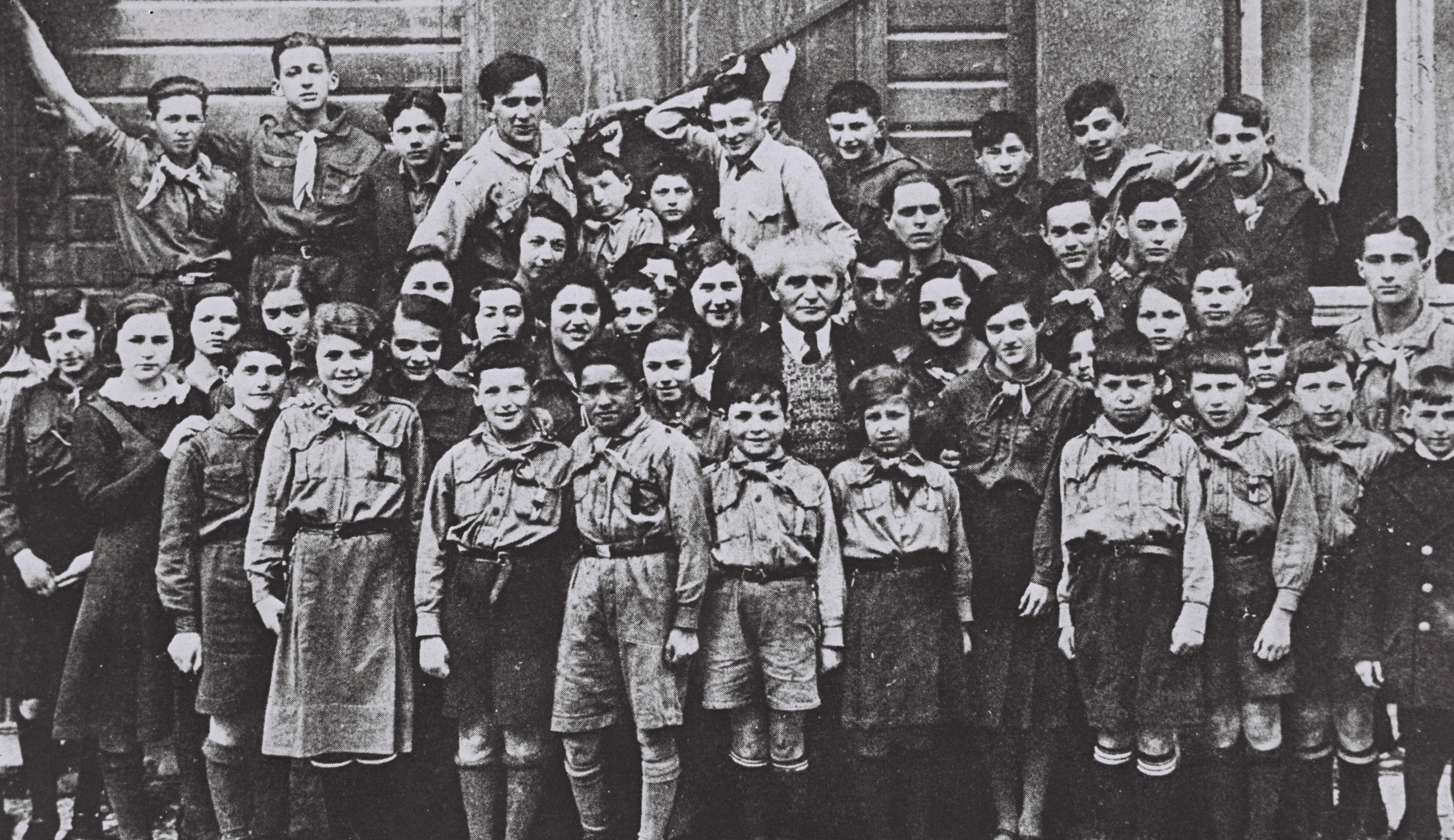
The Jewish Zionist Youth Movement in Tallinn, Estonia, on 1 September 1933

Western Europe's largest Jewish community, and the third-largest Jewish community in the world, can be found in France, home to between 483,000 and 500,000 Jews, the majority of whom are immigrants or refugees from North African countries such as Algeria, Morocco, and Tunisia (or their descendants). The United Kingdom has a Jewish community of 292,000. In Eastern Europe, the exact figures are difficult to establish. The number of Jews in Russia varies widely according to whether a source uses census data (which requires a person to choose a single nationality among choices that include "Russian" and "Jewish") or eligibility for immigration to Israel (which requires that a person have one or more Jewish grandparents). According to the latter criteria, the heads of the Russian Jewish community assert that up to 1.5 million Russians are eligible for aliyah. In Germany, the 102,000 Jews registered with the Jewish community are a slowly declining population, despite the immigration of tens of thousands of Jews from the former Soviet Union since the fall of the Berlin Wall. Thousands of Israelis also live in Germany, either permanently or temporarily, for economic reasons.

Prior to 1948, approximately 800,000 Jews were living in lands which now make up the Arab world (excluding Israel). Of these, just under two-thirds lived in the French-controlled Maghreb region, 15 to 20 percent in the Kingdom of Iraq, approximately 10 percent in the Kingdom of Egypt and approximately 7 percent in the Kingdom of Yemen. A further 200,000 lived in Pahlavi Iran and the Republic of Turkey. Today, around 26,000 Jews live in Muslim-majority countries, mainly in Turkey (14,200) and Iran (9,100), while Morocco (2,000), Tunisia (1,000), and the United Arab Emirates (500) host the largest communities in the Arab world. A small-scale exodus had begun in many countries in the early decades of the 20th century, although the only substantial aliyah came from Yemen and Syria. The exodus from Arab and Muslim countries took place primarily from 1948. The first large-scale exoduses took place in the late 1940s and early 1950s, primarily in Iraq, Yemen and Libya, with up to 90 percent of these communities leaving within a few years. The peak of the exodus from Egypt occurred in 1956. The exodus in the Maghreb countries peaked in the 1960s. Lebanon was the only Arab country to see a temporary increase in its Jewish population during this period, due to an influx of refugees from other Arab countries, although by the mid-1970s the Jewish community of Lebanon had also dwindled. In the aftermath of the exodus wave from Arab states, an additional migration of Iranian Jews peaked in the 1980s when around 80 percent of Iranian Jews left the country.

Outside Europe, the Americas, the Middle East, and the rest of Asia, there are significant Jewish populations in Australia (112,500) and South Africa (70,000). There is also a 6,800-strong community in New Zealand.

=== Demographic changes ===
==== Assimilation ====
Since at least the time of the Ancient Greeks, a proportion of Jews have assimilated into the wider non-Jewish society around them, by either choice or force, ceasing to practice Judaism and losing their Jewish identity. Assimilation took place in all areas, and during all time periods, with some Jewish communities, for example, the Kaifeng Jews of China, disappearing entirely. The advent of the Jewish Enlightenment of the 18th century (see Haskalah) and the subsequent emancipation of the Jewish populations of Europe and America in the 19th century, accelerated the situation, encouraging Jews to increasingly participate in, and become part of, secular society. The result has been a growing trend of assimilation, as Jews marry non-Jewish spouses and stop participating in the Jewish community.

Rates of interreligious marriage vary widely: In the United States, it is just under 50 percent; in the United Kingdom, around 53 percent; in France, around 30 percent; and in Australia and Mexico, as low as 10 percent. In the United States, only about a third of children from intermarriages affiliate with Jewish religious practice. The result is that most countries in the Diaspora have steady or slightly declining religiously Jewish populations as Jews continue to assimilate into the countries in which they live.

==== War and persecution ====
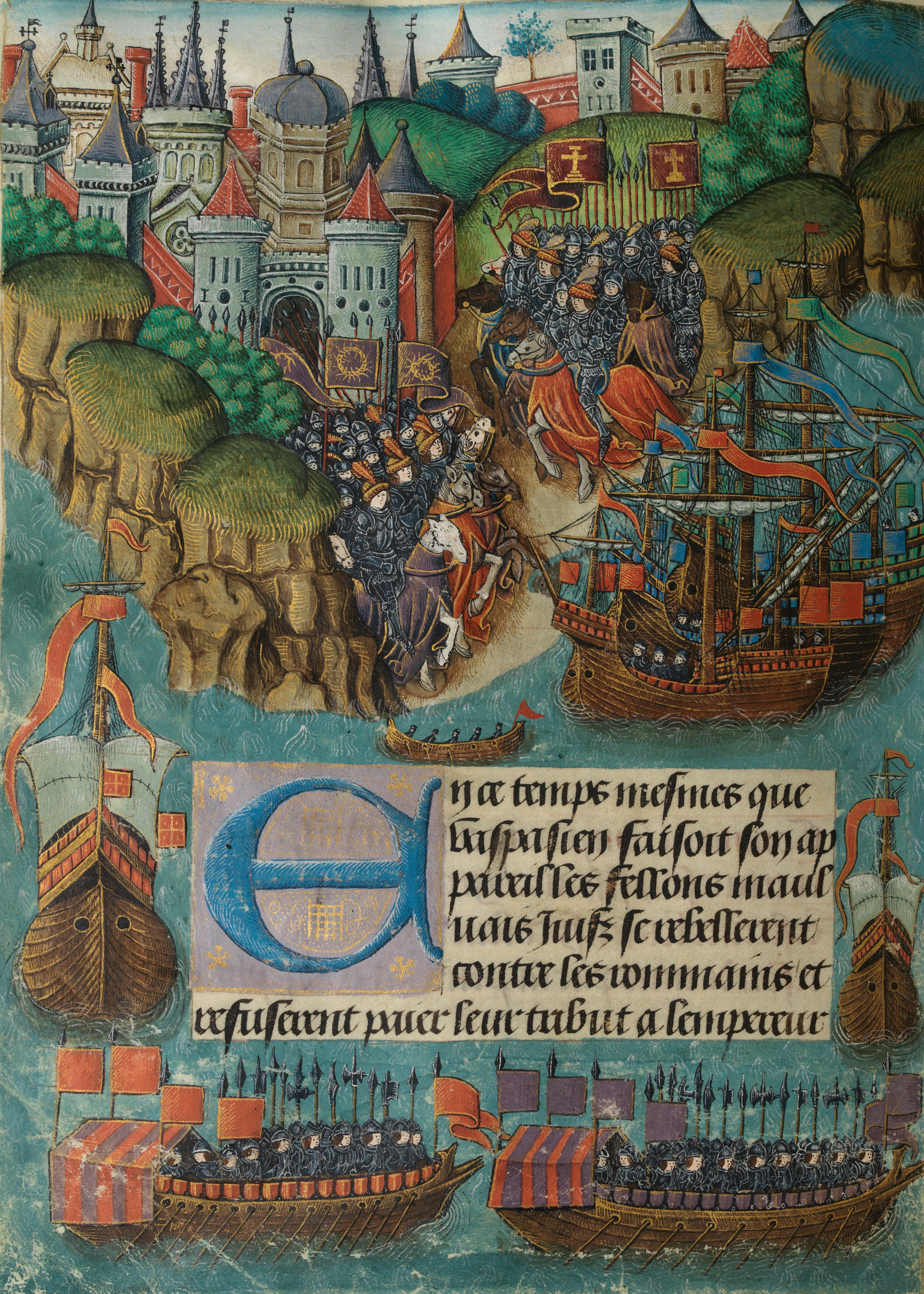
The Roman Emperor Nero sends Vespasian with an army to destroy the Jews, 69 CE.

The Jewish people and Judaism have experienced various persecutions throughout their history. During Late Antiquity and the Early Middle Ages, the Roman Empire (in its later phases known as the Byzantine Empire) repeatedly repressed the Jewish population, first by ejecting them from their homelands during the pagan Roman era and later by officially establishing them as second-class citizens during the Christian Roman era.

According to James Carroll, "Jews accounted for 10% of the total population of the Roman Empire. By that ratio, if other factors had not intervened, there would be 200 million Jews in the world today, instead of something like 13 million."

Later in medieval Western Europe, further persecutions of Jews by Christians occurred, notably during the Crusades—when Jews all over Germany were massacred—and in a series of expulsions from the Kingdom of England, Germany, and France. Then there occurred the largest expulsion of all, when Spain and Portugal, after the Reconquista (the Catholic Reconquest of the Iberian Peninsula), expelled both unbaptized Sephardic Jews and the ruling Muslim Moors.

In the Papal States, which existed until 1870, Jews were required to live only in specified neighborhoods called ghettos.

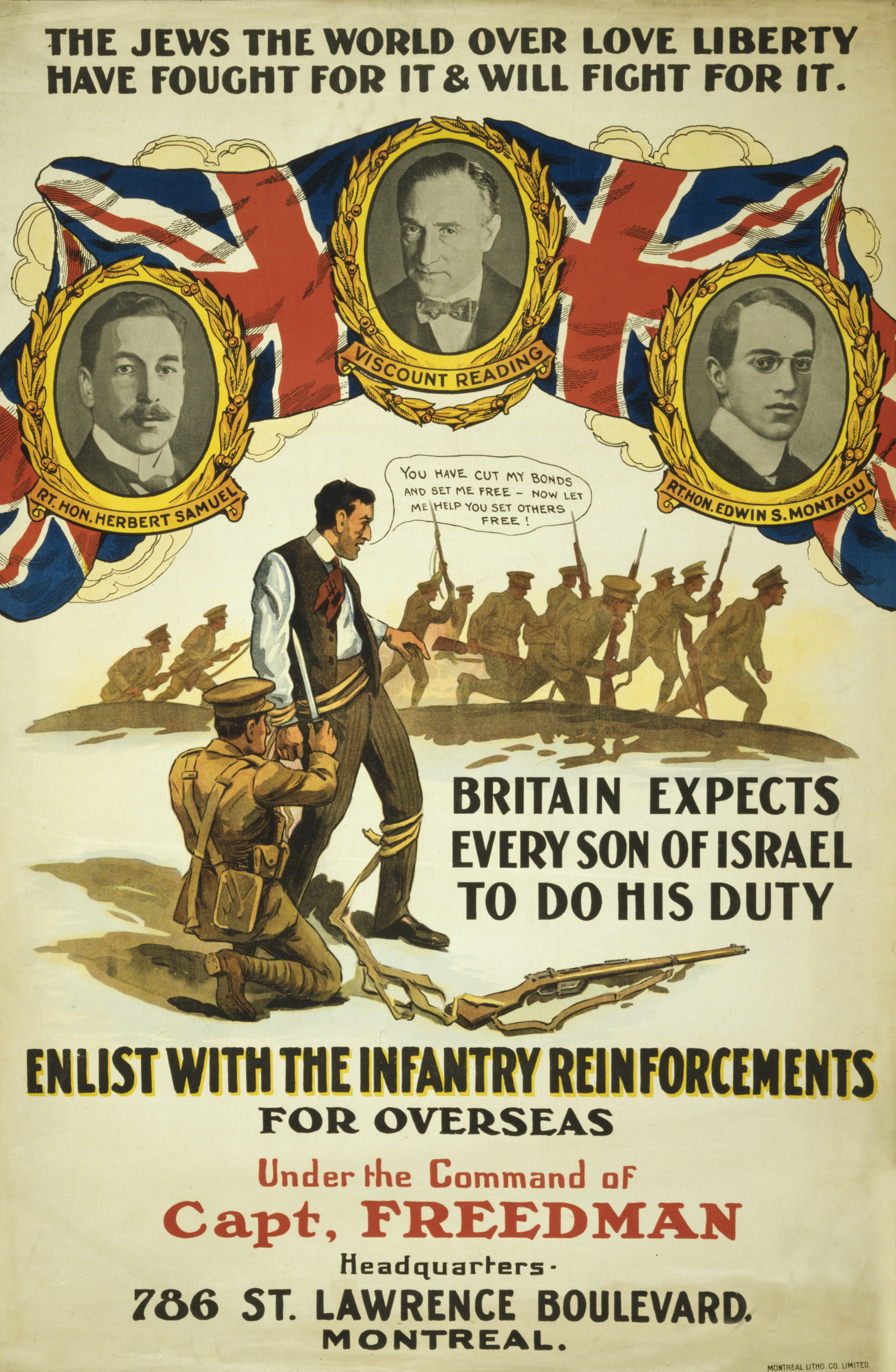
World War I poster showing a soldier cutting the bonds from a Jewish man, who says, "You have cut my bonds and set me free—now let me help you set others free!"

Islam and Judaism have a complex relationship. Traditionally Jews and Christians living in Muslim lands, known as dhimmis, were allowed to practice their religions and administer their internal affairs, but they were subject to certain conditions. They had to pay the jizya (a per capita tax imposed on free adult non-Muslim males) to the Islamic state. Dhimmis had an inferior status under Islamic rule. They had several social and legal disabilities such as prohibitions against bearing arms or giving testimony in courts in cases involving Muslims. Many of the disabilities were highly symbolic. The one described by Bernard Lewis as "most degrading" was the requirement of distinctive clothing, not found in the Quran or hadith but invented in early medieval Baghdad; its enforcement was highly erratic. On the other hand, Jews rarely faced martyrdom or exile, or forced compulsion to change their religion, and they were mostly free in their choice of residence and profession.

Notable exceptions include the massacre of Jews and forcible conversion of some Jews by the rulers of the Almohad dynasty in Al-Andalus in the 12th century, as well as in Islamic Persia, and the forced confinement of Moroccan Jews to walled quarters known as mellahs beginning from the 15th century and especially in the early 19th century. In modern times, it has become commonplace for standard antisemitic themes to be conflated with anti-Zionist publications and pronouncements of Islamic movements such as Hezbollah and Hamas, in the pronouncements of various agencies of the Islamic Republic of Iran, and even in the newspapers and other publications of Turkish Refah Partisi."

Throughout history, many rulers, empires and nations have oppressed their Jewish populations or sought to eliminate them entirely. Methods employed ranged from expulsion to outright genocide; within nations, often the threat of these extreme methods was sufficient to silence dissent. The history of antisemitism includes the First Crusade which resulted in the massacre of Jews; the Spanish Inquisition (led by Tomás de Torquemada) and the Portuguese Inquisition, with their persecution and autos-da-fé against the New Christians and Marrano Jews; the Bohdan Chmielnicki Cossack massacres in Ukraine; the Pogroms backed by the Russian Tsars; as well as expulsions from Spain, Portugal, England, France, Germany, and other countries in which the Jews had settled. According to a 2008 study published in the American Journal of Human Genetics, 19.8 percent of the modern Iberian population has Sephardic Jewish ancestry, indicating that the number of conversos may have been much higher than originally thought.

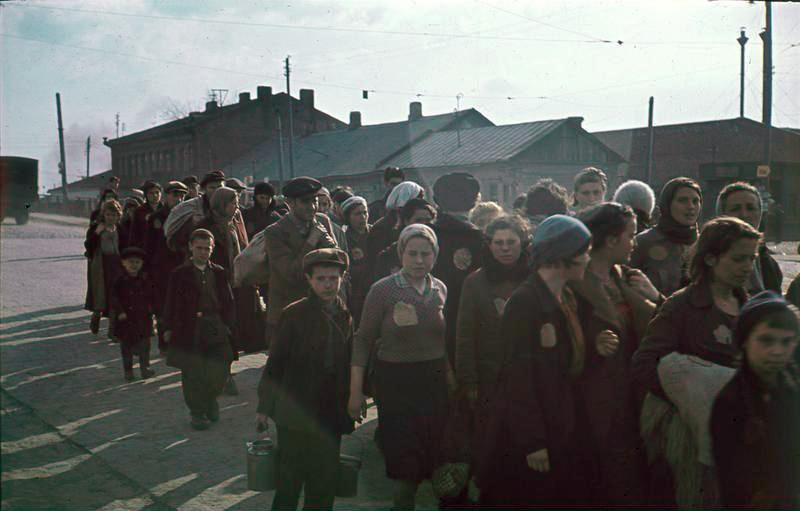
Jews in Minsk, 1941. Before World War II, some 40 percent of the population was Jewish. By the time the Red Army retook the city on 3 July 1944, there were only a few Jewish survivors.

The persecution reached a peak in Nazi Germany's Final Solution, which led to the Holocaust and the slaughter of approximately 6 million Jews. Of the world's 16 million Jews in 1939, almost 40% were murdered in the Holocaust. The Holocaust—the state-led systematic persecution and genocide of European Jews (and certain communities of North African Jews in European controlled North Africa) and other minority groups of Europe during World War II by Germany and its collaborators—remains the most notable modern-day persecution of Jews. The persecution and genocide were accomplished in stages. Legislation to remove the Jews from civil society was enacted years before the outbreak of World War II. Concentration camps were established in which inmates were used as slave labour until they died of exhaustion or disease. Where the Third Reich conquered new territory in Eastern Europe, specialized units called Einsatzgruppen murdered Jews and political opponents in mass shootings. Jews and Roma were crammed into ghettos before being transported hundreds of kilometres by freight train to extermination camps where, if they survived the journey, the majority of them were murdered in gas chambers. Virtually every arm of Germany's bureaucracy was involved in the logistics of the mass murder, turning the country into what one Holocaust scholar has called "a genocidal nation."

==== Migrations ====
Expulsions of Jews in Europe from 1100 to 1600

Throughout Jewish history, Jews have repeatedly been directly or indirectly expelled from both their original homeland, the Land of Israel, and many of the areas in which they have settled. This experience as refugees has shaped Jewish identity and religious practice in many ways, and is thus a major element of Jewish history. In summary, the pogroms in Eastern Europe, the rise of modern antisemitism, the Holocaust, as well as the rise of Arab nationalism, all served to fuel the movements and migrations of huge segments of Jewry from land to land and continent to continent until they arrived back in large numbers at their original historical homeland in Israel.

In the Hebrew Bible, the patriarch Abraham is described as a migrant to the land of Canaan from Ur of the Chaldees. His descendants, the Children of Israel, undertook the Exodus (meaning "departure" or "exit" in Greek) from ancient Egypt, as described in the Book of Exodus.

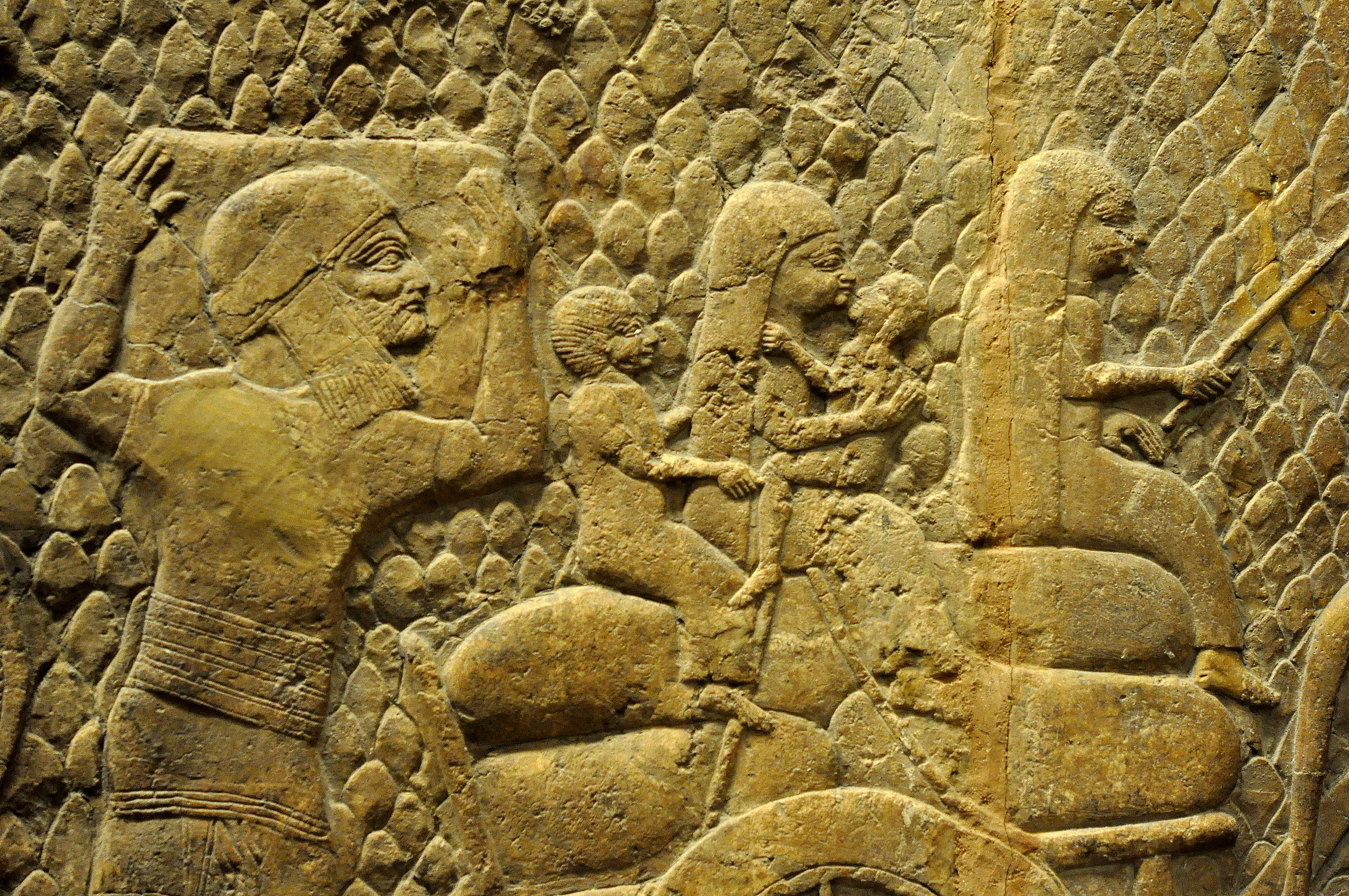
Residents of Lachish, Judah, being deported into exile following the conquest of the city by the Assyrians, c. 701 BCE

The first movement documented in the historical record occurred with the resettlement policy of the Neo-Assyrian Empire, which mandated the deportation of conquered peoples, and it is estimated some 4,500,000 among its captive populations suffered this dislocation over three centuries of Assyrian rule. With regard to Israel, Tiglath-Pileser III claims he deported 80% of the population of Lower Galilee, some 13,520 people. Some 27,000 Israelites, 20 to 25% of the population of the Kingdom of Israel, were described as being deported by Sargon II, and were replaced by other deported populations and sent into permanent exile by Assyria, initially to the Upper Mesopotamian provinces of the Assyrian Empire. Between 10,000 and 80,000 people from the Kingdom of Judah were similarly exiled by Babylonia, but these people were then returned to Judea by Cyrus the Great of the Persian Achaemenid Empire.

Many Jews were exiled again by the Roman Empire. The 2,000 year dispersion of the Jewish diaspora beginning under the Roman Empire, as Jews were spread throughout the Roman world and, driven from land to land, settled wherever they could live freely enough to practice their religion. Over the course of the diaspora the center of Jewish life moved from Babylonia to the Iberian Peninsula to Poland to the United States and, as a result of Zionism, back to Israel.

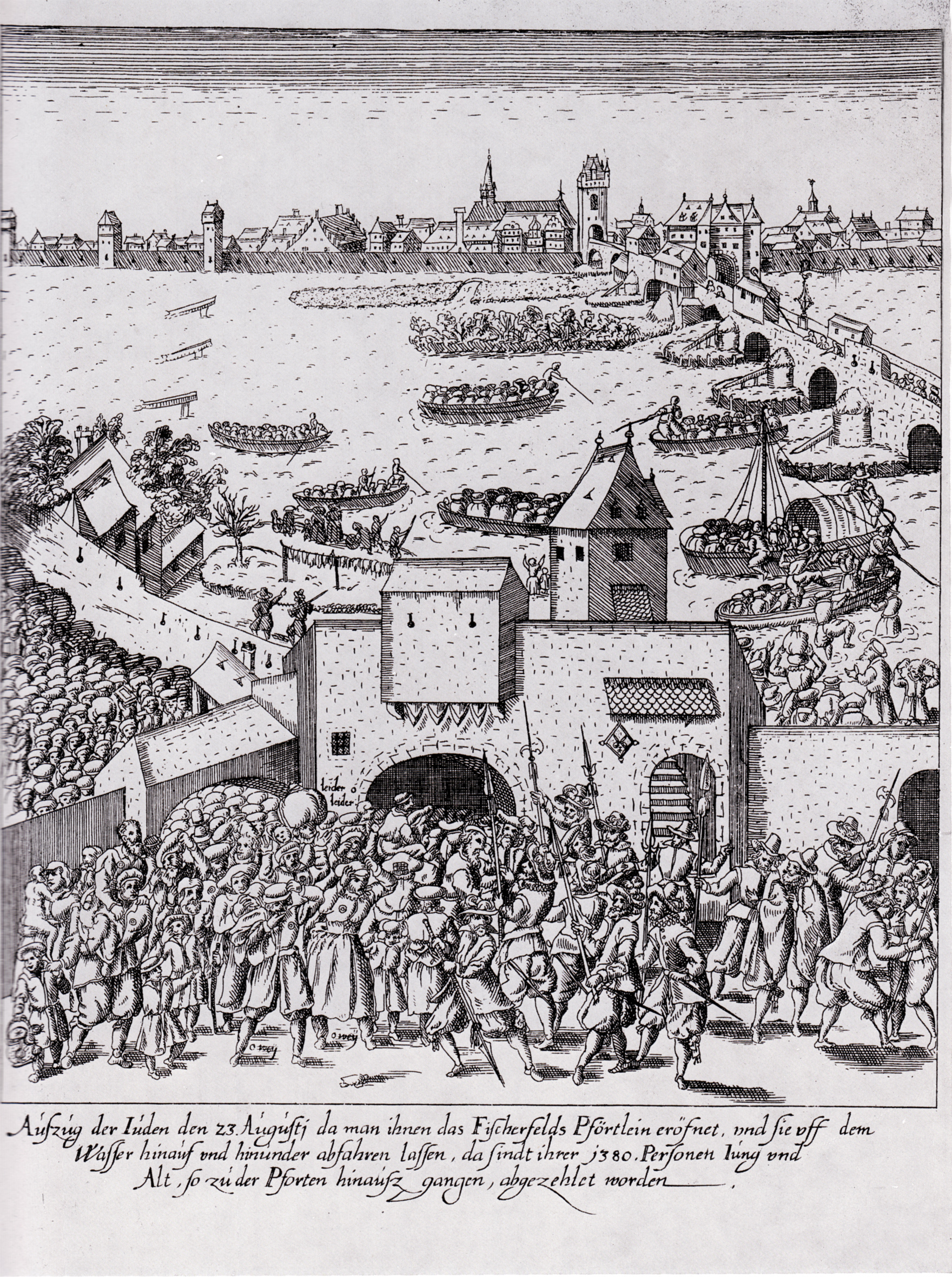
Etching of the expulsion of the Jews from Frankfurt in 1614. The text says: "1380 persons old and young were counted at the exit of the gate".

There were also many expulsions of Jews during the Middle Ages and the Enlightenment in Europe, including: 1290, 16,000 Jews were expelled from England (see the Statute of Jewry); in 1396, 100,000 from France; in 1421, thousands were expelled from Austria. Many of these Jews settled in East-Central Europe, especially Poland. Following the Spanish Inquisition in 1492, the Spanish population of around 200,000 Sephardic Jews were expelled by the Spanish crown and Catholic church, followed by expulsions in 1493 in Sicily (37,000 Jews) and Portugal in 1496. The expelled Jews fled mainly to the Ottoman Empire, the Netherlands, and North Africa, others migrating to Southern Europe and the Middle East.

During the 19th century, France's policies of equal citizenship regardless of religion led to the immigration of Jews (especially from Eastern and Central Europe). This contributed to the arrival of millions of Jews in the New World. Over two million Eastern European Jews arrived in the United States from 1880 to 1925.

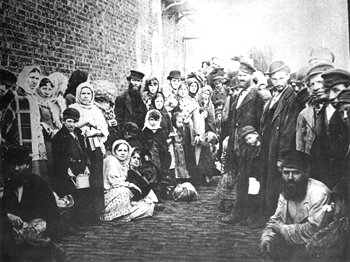
Jews fleeing pogroms, 1882

In the latest phase of migrations, the Islamic Revolution of Iran caused many Iranian Jews to flee Iran. Most found refuge in the US (particularly Los Angeles, California, and Long Island, New York) and Israel. Smaller communities of Persian Jews exist in Canada and Western Europe. Similarly, when the Soviet Union collapsed, many of the Jews in the affected territory (who had been refuseniks) were suddenly allowed to leave. This produced a wave of migration to Israel in the early 1990s.

==== Growth ====
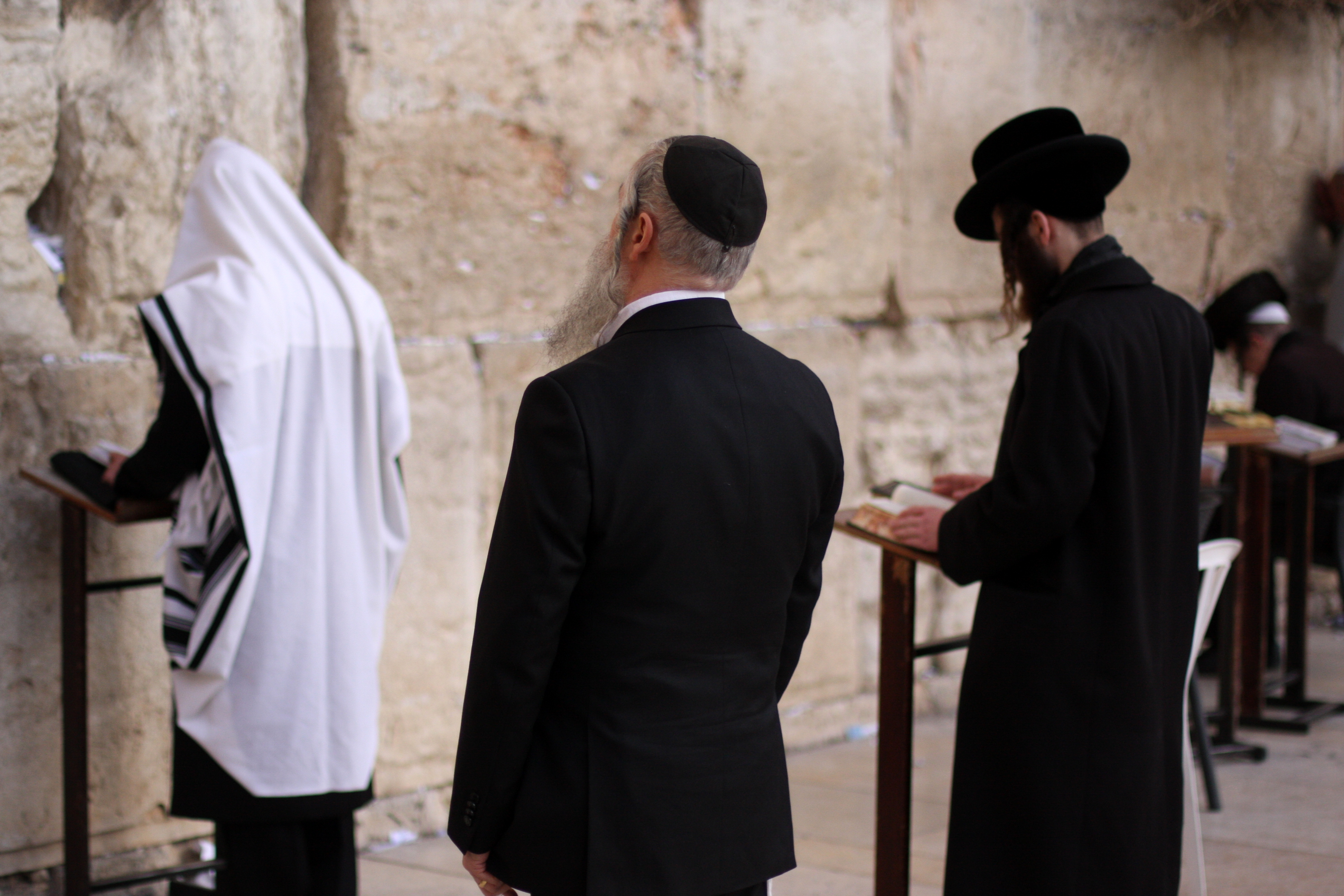
Praying at the Western Wall

Israel is the only country with a Jewish population that is consistently growing through natural population growth, although the Jewish populations of other countries, in Europe and North America, have recently increased through immigration. In the Diaspora, in almost every country, the Jewish population in general is either declining or steady, but Orthodox and Haredi Jewish communities, whose members often shun birth control for religious reasons, have experienced rapid population growth.

Orthodox and Conservative Judaism discourage proselytism to non-Jews, but many Jewish groups have tried to reach out to the assimilated Jewish communities of the Diaspora for them to reconnect to their Jewish roots. Additionally, while in principle Reform Judaism favours seeking new members for the faith, this position has not translated into active proselytism, instead taking the form of an effort to reach out to non-Jewish spouses of intermarried couples.

There is also a trend of Orthodox movements reaching out to secular Jews in order to give them a stronger Jewish identity so there is less chance of intermarriage. As a result of the efforts by these and other Jewish groups over the past 25 years, there has been a trend (known as the Baal teshuva movement) for secular Jews to become more religiously observant, though the demographic implications of the trend are unknown. Additionally, there is also a growing rate of conversion to Jews by Choice of gentiles who make the decision to head in the direction of becoming Jews.

== Contributions ==
Jewish individuals have played a significant role in the development and growth of Western culture, advancing many fields of thought, science and technology, both historically and in modern times, including through discrete trends in Jewish philosophy, Jewish ethics and Jewish literature, as well as specific trends in Jewish culture, including in Jewish art, Jewish music, Jewish humor, Jewish theatre, Jewish cuisine and Jewish medicine. Jews have established various Jewish political movements, religious movements, and, through the authorship of the Hebrew Bible and parts of the New Testament, provided the foundation for Christianity and Islam. More than 20 percent of the awarded Nobel Prize have gone to individuals of Jewish descent. Philanthropic giving is a widespread core function among Jewish organizations.
