= Armentarius (moneylender) =

Jewish moneylender

Armentarius (died 584) was a Jewish moneylender, active in Francia under the Merovingian dynasty. He was murdered in Tours, causing a controversy over who was responsible. The main source about him is Gregory of Tours. He should probably not be confused with the similarly named Armentarius, the archiatrus (chief physician) of Tours, who is mentioned treating Gregory in 573.

== Murder ==
Armentarius was a Jew. His role as a moneylender can be deduced by his activities. He is recorded lending money to Eunomius and Iniuriosus. He would be paid by a portion of the public taxes (propter tributa publica, loaned against the public taxes). Eunomius was the Count of Tours (comes), Iniuriosus was his vicarius (deputy).

Armentarius arrived in Tours to collect payment. He was accompanied "by a man of his own religion and two Christians". The first was obviously a fellow Jew. It is unclear if the other two were business partners of Armentarius or merely his bodyguards. The two leaders of Tours invited Armentarius into their dwelling, promising payment and gifts. Armentarius and Iniuriosus shared dinner, then the visitor left.

What followed is uncertain. Armentarius was found murdered, his money and papers stolen. Servants of Iniuriosus were accused of the murder, implicating their master. Gregory suggests the tribune Medardus (Latin: Medardum tribunum) as an alternative suspect, since the latter was also a client of the victim.

Iniuriosus denied any involvement in the murder. He swore a legal oath to that effect. The family of Armentarius demanded that Childebert II (r. 575–595) should decide on the case. Iniuriosus visited the royal court, presumably at Metz, for his hearing. He waited three days for his accusers to appear. Since Armentarius' relatives never appeared at court, the case was dismissed. Iniuriosus returned home with no further incident.

== Interpretation ==
Jonathan Elukin examined the case as part of the "difficult ... to characterize ... Jewish experience in Merovingian society". The narrative suggests a few things about the role of Armentarius in Merovingian society. He could travel freely, suggesting a right to freedom of movement. He seems to have had a long-established financial relationship with the authorities of Tours. His clients inviting him into their homes and even sharing a meal with him is not mentioned by Gregory as extraordinary. For Armentarius this suggests that his relations with Frankish leaders were "casual and routine". For Jews in general it suggests they could socialize with the Christians.

Another point of interest is the ability of Armentarius' family to bring the case to the monarch. Elukin deduces that this access to the monarch could mean they had "real influence". That Iniuriosus escaped, does not necessarily mean his accusers were "powerless or abused". They might have decided against pressing the case. Elukin suggests that they could have been thwarted by "the lack of evidence" on who was responsible.

Elukin also calls attention to some elements missing from the narrative. There is no sense that the story has a moral, a conveyed message. There is no criticism of the victim as greedy or devious. Typical stereotypes of Jews are absent, with Gregory reporting the case in an "understated and straightforward manner". He barely calls attention to the Jewish identity of the victim. The narrative is argued to be part of a longstanding theme of Gregory's history: "the lawlesness and mystery of Frankish society".

== Sources ==
- Elukin, Jonathan M. (2007), Living together, living apart: rethinking Jewish-Christian relations in the Middle Ages, Princeton University Press, ISBN 978-0-691-11487-3
- Heinzelmann, Martin (2001), Gregory of Tours: history and society in the sixth century, Cambridge University Press, ISBN 978-0-521-63174-7
- Martindale, John R.; Jones, A.H.M.; Morris, John (1992), The Prosopography of the Later Roman Empire, Volume III: AD 527–641, Cambridge University Press, ISBN 0-521-20160-8
