= Genesis flood narrative =

Biblical flood myth

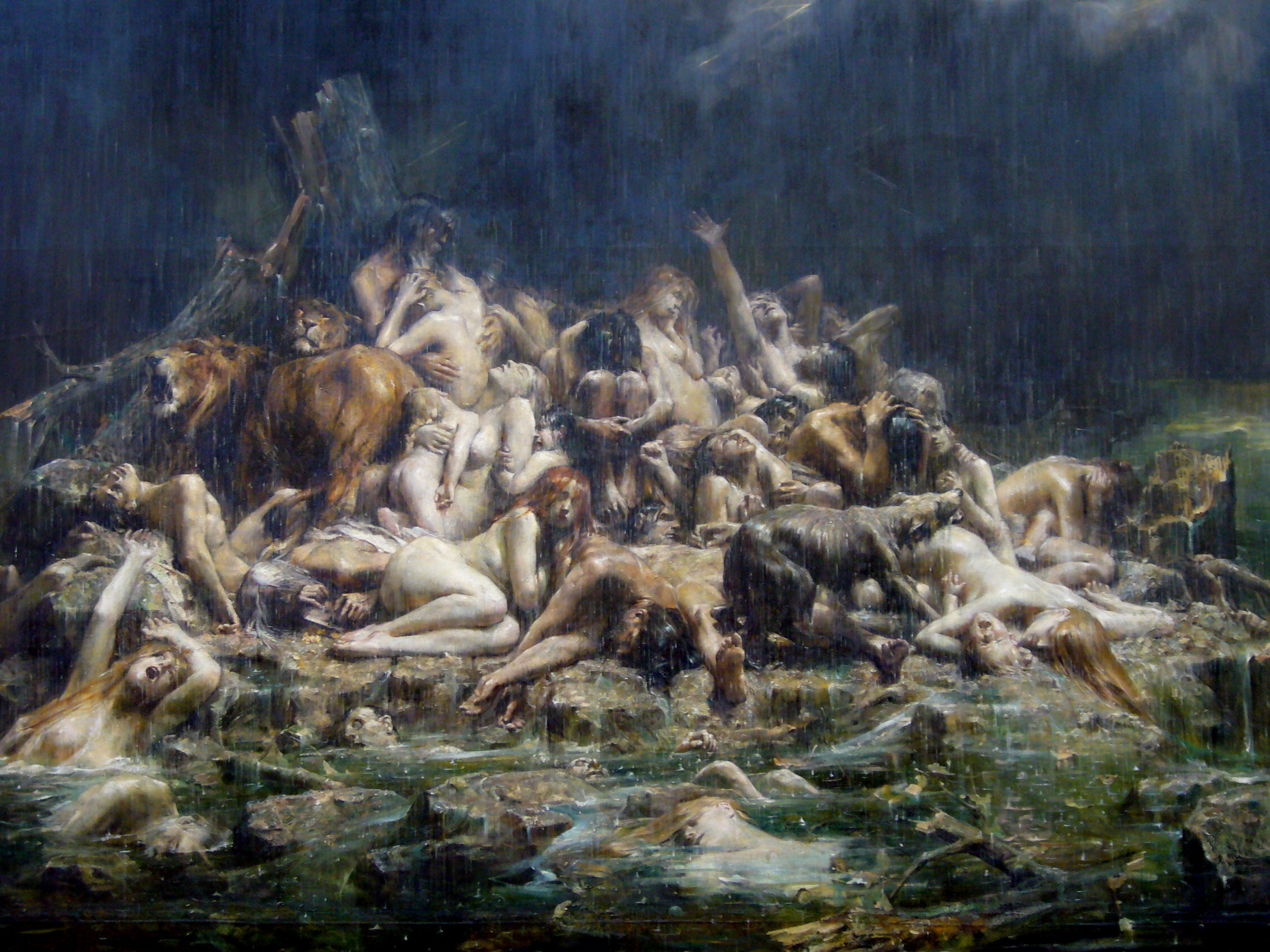
The Flood of Noah and Companions (c. 1911) by Léon Comerre

The Genesis flood narrative of the Book of Genesis is a Hebrew flood myth. It tells of God's decision to destroy creation, saving only Noah and the people and animals who went with him into an ark built on God's instructions.

Scholars generally believe it was adapted from older Mesopotamian flood traditions, especially the Epic of Gilgamesh, which originated in the early 2nd millennium BCE and later spread to the Levant. The Book of Genesis was probably composed around the 5th century BCE; some scholars believe that primeval history (chapters 1–11), including the flood narrative, may have been composed and added as late as the 3rd century BCE. It draws on two sources, called the Priestly source and the non-Priestly or Yahwist, and many of its details are contradictory.

A global flood as described in this myth is inconsistent with the physical findings of geology, archeology, paleontology, and the global distribution of species. A branch of creationism known as flood geology is a pseudoscientific attempt to argue that such a global flood actually occurred. Some Christians have preferred to interpret the narrative as describing a local flood instead of a global event, particularly in regards to the Black Sea and Persian Gulf, both of which were considerably lower in prehistoric times. Still others prefer to interpret the narrative as allegorical rather than historical.

== Summary ==
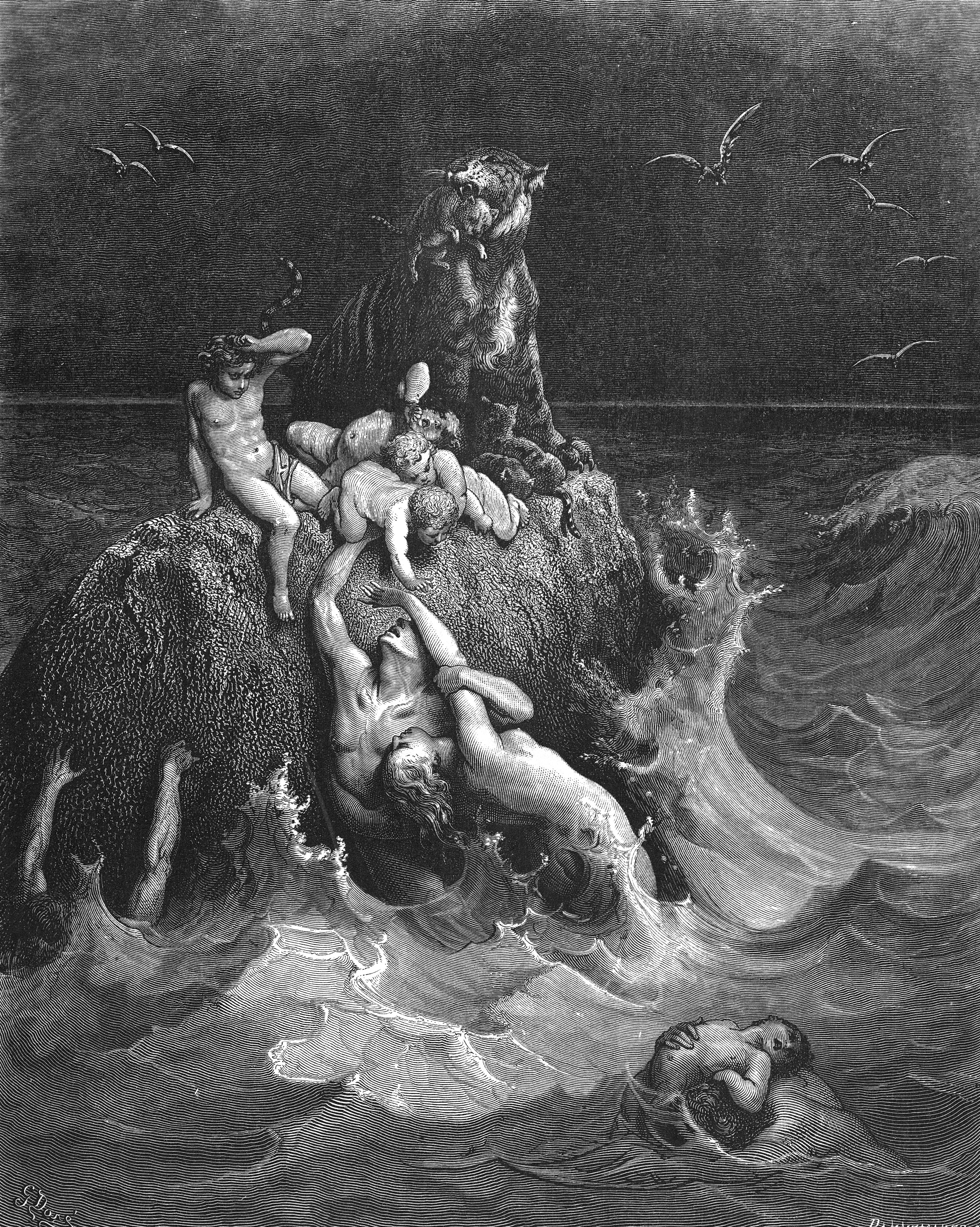
The Deluge (1865) by Gustave Doré

The story of the flood occurs in chapters 6–9 of the Book of Genesis, the first book of the Bible. Ten generations after the creation of Adam, God saw that the earth was corrupt and filled with violence, and that every intention of the thoughts of man's heart was only evil continually, so he decided to destroy what he had created. But God found one righteous man, Noah, and to him he confided his intention: "I am about to bring on the Flood ... to eliminate everywhere all flesh in which there is the breath of life ... ." So God instructed him to build an ark (in Hebrew, a chest or box), and Noah entered the Ark in his six hundredth year [of life], and on the 17th day of the second month of that year "the fountains of the Great Deep burst apart and the floodgates of heaven broke open" and rain fell for forty days and forty nights until the highest mountains were covered to a depth of 15 cubits, and all life perished except Noah and those with him in the Ark. After 150 days, "God remembered Noah ... and the waters subsided" until the Ark rested on the mountains of Ararat, and on the 27th day of the second month of Noah's six hundred and first year the earth was dry. Then Noah built an altar and made a sacrifice, and God made a covenant with Noah that man would be allowed to eat every living thing but not its blood, and that God would never again destroy all life by a flood.

== Composition ==
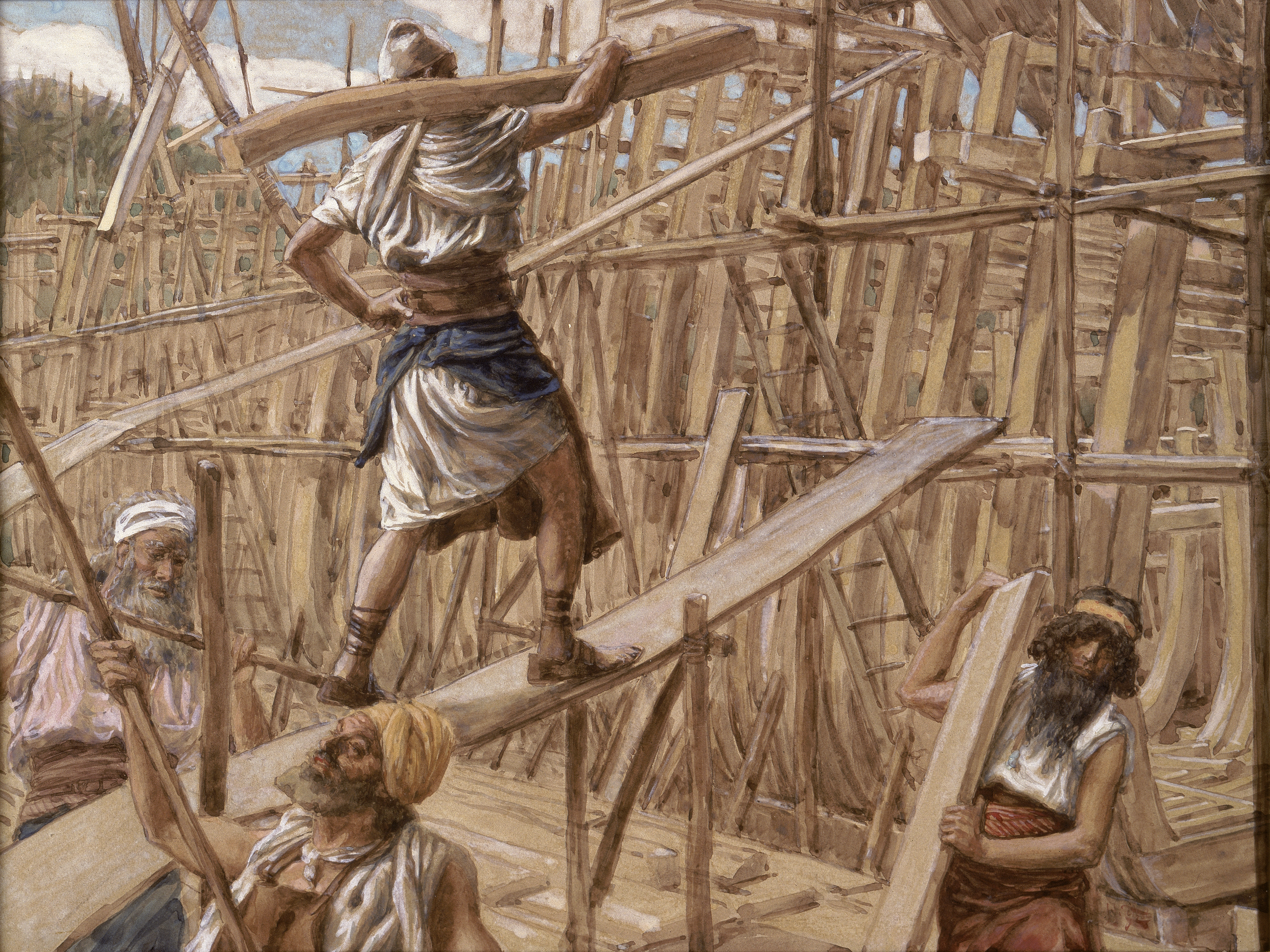
Building the Ark (watercolor c. 1896–1902 by James Tissot)

The consensus of modern scholars is that although Genesis was composed around the 5th century BCE, it was influenced by texts and traditions that are far older. As the first 11 chapters show little relationship to the rest of the book, some scholars believe that this section may have been composed as late as the 3rd century BCE.

It is generally agreed that the history draws on two sources, one called the Priestly source, the other non-Priestly or Yahwist, and their interweaving is evidenced in the doublets (i.e., repetitions) contained within the final story. Many of these are contradictory, such as how long the flood lasted (40 days according to Genesis 7:17, 150 according to 7:24), how many animals were to be taken aboard the ark (one pair of each in 6:19, one pair of the unclean animals and seven pairs of the clean in 7:2), and whether Noah released a raven which "went to and fro until the waters were dried up" or a dove which on the third occasion "did not return to him again", or possibly both. But despite these disagreements on details, the story forms a unified whole (some scholars see in it a "chiasm", a literary structure in which the first item matches the last, the second the second-last, and so on), (Note: The controversial existence of a chiasm is not an argument against the construction of the story from two sources. See the overview in Friedman (1996), p. 91) and many efforts have been made to explain this unity, including attempts to identify which of the two sources was earlier and therefore influenced the other. David M. Carr views the existence of specific contradictions and thematic differences between the doublets, as implying they were written separately.

Some scholars have questioned whether the story is actually based on two different sources, noting that some of the doublets (such as the dove and raven) are not actually contradictory and in fact appear as linked motifs in other biblical and non-biblical sources, that the method of doublets is inconsistently applied in that the alleged sources themselves contain doublets, and that the theory assumes a redactor who combined the sources inconsistently (in some cases extensively editing together the text and in some cases faithfully preserving contradictory versions) for unclear reasons. Similarly, the complete Genesis flood story matches the parallel Gilgamesh flood story in a way which neither of the proposed biblical sources does.

Jean-Louise Ska of the Pontifical Biblical Institute, believes that the account of the flood as it exists is a cantata "sung" by two or more voices, being polyphonic. For him, readings that attempt to eliminate these voices diminish textual analysis, but also the intended message.

=== Sources ===
The following table compares the proposed Yahwist and Priestly sources. Each provides a complete story-line, with introductions and conclusions, reasons for the flood, and theologies.

| Verses | Yahwist (or non-Priestly) | Priestly |
|---|---|---|
| 6:5–8 | Introduction: humanity's wickedness, God regrets creating, announces decision to destroy; Noah's righteousness. | |
| 6:9–22 | | Introduction: Noah's righteousness, humanity's wickedness, God's decision to destroy; Ark described, Covenant described, 1 pair of all animals, Noah does as God commands. |
| 7:1–5 | 7 pairs of clean animals, 1 pair unclean; 7 days to gather animals; Noah does as God commands. | |
| 7:6 | | Noah's age: 600 years |
| 7:7–10 | Noah enters Ark with animals after 7 days | |
| 7:11 | | Year 600, month 2, day 17: firmament breaks, waters fall from above and rise from below. |
| 7:12 | Rains 40 days and 40 nights. | |
| 7:13–16a | | Noah and family and animals enter Ark on same day as flood begins. |
| 7:16b–17 | Waters rise for 40 days, the Ark begins to float. | |
| 7:18–21 | | Waters rise, all creatures destroyed. |
| 7:22–23 | All creatures destroyed. | |
| 7:24–8:5 | | Flood lasts 150 days; God remembers Noah, fountains and floodgates closed, waters recede; Month 7 day 17, Ark grounds on mountains of Ararat. |
| 8:6–12 | After 7 days Noah opens window, sends out raven, dove, dove, 7 days between flights | |
| 8:13–19 | | Year 601, month 1, day 1: Noah opens cover; ground begins to dry; Month 2, day 27, dry land appears, Noah and family and animals exit, animals begin to multiply |
| 8:20–22 | Noah builds altar, sacrifices clean animals, God smells sweet aroma, promises not to destroy again. | |
| 9:1–17 | | Noah and family told to multiply, given animals to eat; Covenant established, rainbow as sign, God promises not to flood again. |

== Comparative mythology ==
Scholars believe that the flood myth originated in Mesopotamia during the Old Babylonian Period (c. 1880 – c. 1595 BCE) and reached the Syro-Palestine in the latter half of the 2nd millennium BCE. Extant texts show three distinct versions, the Sumerian Epic of Ziusudra, (the oldest, found in very fragmentary form on a single tablet dating from about 1600 BCE, although the story itself is older), and as episodes in two Akkadian language epics, the Atrahasis and the Epic of Gilgamesh. The name of the hero, according to the version concerned, was Ziusudra, Atrahasis, or Utnapishtim, all of which are variations of each other, and it is possible that an abbreviation of Utnapishtim/Utna'ishtim as "na'ish" was pronounced "Noah" in the Palestine.

Numerous and often detailed parallels make clear that the Genesis flood narrative is dependent on the Mesopotamian epics, and particularly on Gilgamesh, which is thought to date from c. 1300 – c. 1000 BCE.

== Flood chronology ==
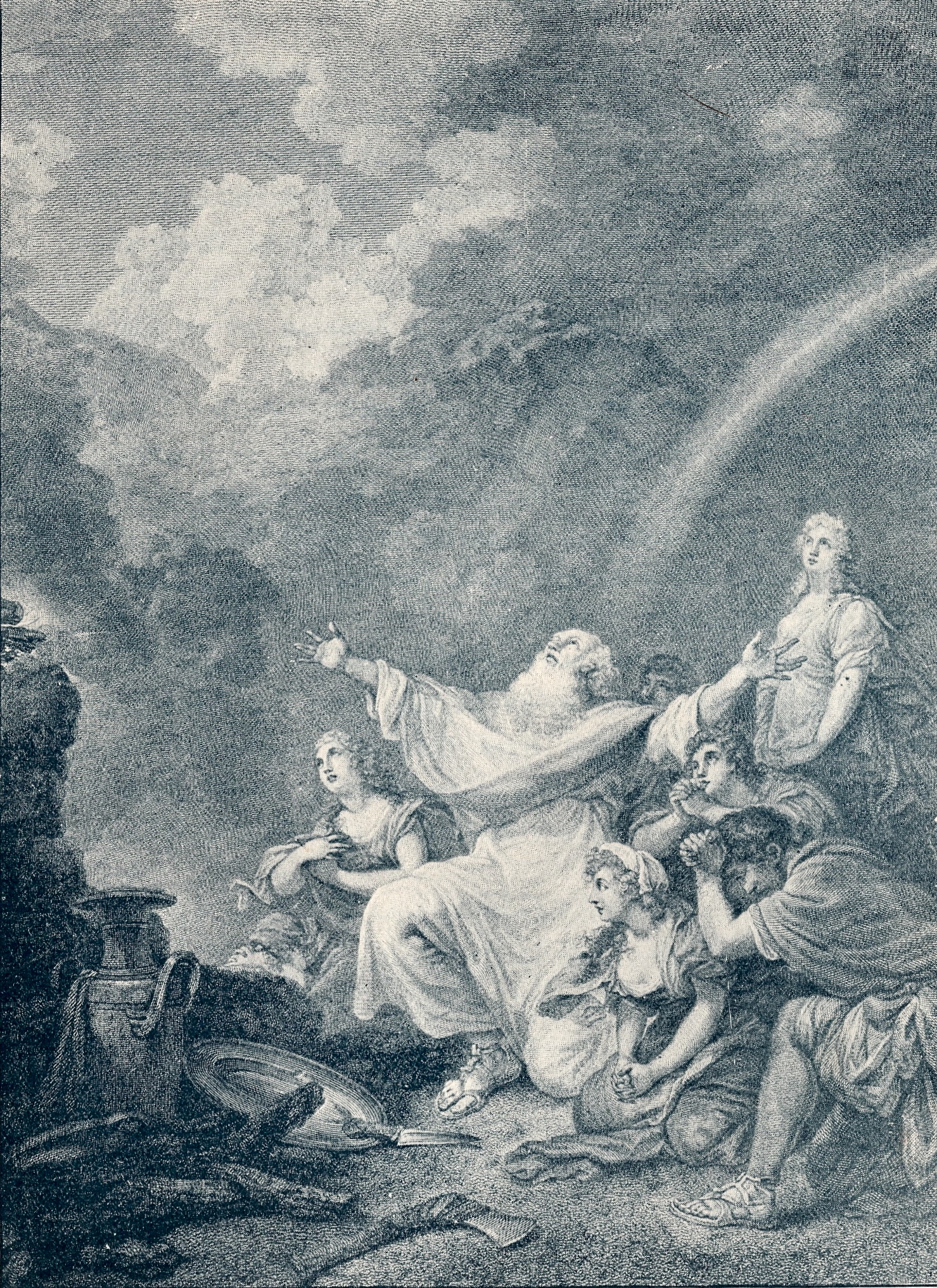
1896 illustration of the symbol of the rainbow, which God created as a sign of the covenant

Numbers in the Bible often have symbolic or idiomatic meaning, and the 40 days and nights for which rain fell on the Earth indicate a complete cycle. The flood begins on the 17th day of the second month, Marcheshvan, in the 600th year of Noah's life, when "the springs of the great deep burst forth, and the floodgates of the heavens were opened", and after 40 days the ark floats (Genesis 7:11–12). The waters rise and then recede, and on the 17th day of the seventh month (or the 27th day in the Greek version) the ark rests on the mountains (Genesis 8:4). The waters continue to fall, the ark is uncovered on the 1st day of the 1st month of Noah's 601st year, and is opened on the 27th day of his 601st year (Genesis 8:13–14).

The period from the beginning of the flood to the landing on the mountain is five months (the second month to the seventh, Genesis 7:11 and 8:4) and 150 days (8:3), making an impossible five months of 30 days each; the number is schematic, and is based on the Babylonian astronomical calendar of 360 days (12 months of 30 days each). This means that the flood lasts 36 weeks according to the flood calendar, in which an extra day is added to every third month. The number of weeks is symbolically significant, representing the biblical cypher for destruction (the number 6, expressed as 6x6=36), while the number 7 (the number of days in a week) represents the persistence of creation during this time of destruction.

Scholars have long puzzled over the significance of the flood lasting one year and 11 days (day 17 of year 600 to day 27 of year 601); one solution is that the basic calendar is a lunar one of 354 days, to which 11 days have been added to match a solar year of 365 days.

The "original" Jahwist narrative of the Great Deluge was modest: a week of ostensibly non-celestial rain is followed by a 40-day flood which takes a mere week to recede in order to provide Noah his stage for God's covenant. It is the Priestly source which adds more fantastic figures of a 150-day flood, which emerged by divine hand from the heavens and earth and took ten months to finally stop. The Jahwist source's capricious and somewhat simplistic depiction of Yahweh is clearly distinguished from the Priestly source's characteristically majestic, transcendental, and austere virtuous Yahweh.

The Priestly flood narrative is the only Priestly text that covers dates with much detail before the Exodus narrative. This is perhaps due to a version of the flood myth that was available at the time. There is a text discovered from Ugarit known as RS 94.2953, consisting of fourteen lines telling a first-person account of how Ea appeared to the story's protagonist and commanded him to use tools to make a window (aptu) at the top of the construction he was building, and how he implemented this directive and released a bird. Antoine Cavigneaux's translation of this text made him propose that this fragment belongs to a Mesopotamian flood myth, perhaps Atrahasis or Tablet IX of Gilgamesh, which has a version found in Ugarit (RS 22.421) that contains a first person account of the flood. If this suggestion is correct, then RS 94.2953 represents a unique version of the Mesopotamian flood story. Line 1 of the text says "At the start of the time of the disappearance of the moon, at the beginning of the month". This reference to the lunar date giving the specific date the protagonist released the bird is significant as it is the only variant of the flood story giving a specific date and the rest do not attribute specific dates or calendrical details to the various stages of the flood. Both RS 94.2953 and Genesis 8 are about the flood protagonist releasing a bird on a specific calendrical date to find land in the middle of the flood.

== Theology: the flood and the creation narrative ==
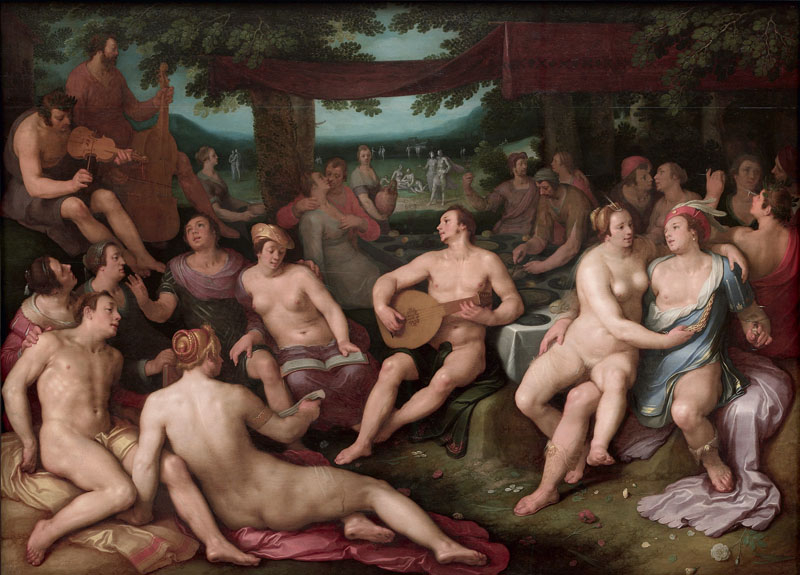
The depravity of mankind before the flood (1615) by Cornelis van Haarlem

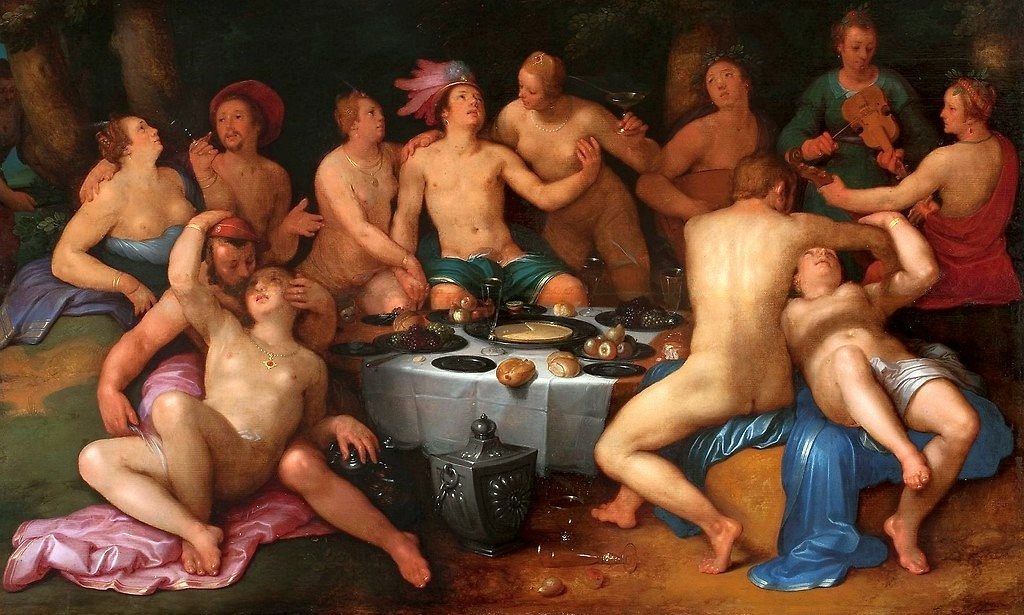
The prodigal son (1615) by Cornelis van Haarlem depicting people engaged in sexual activity before the deluge

The primeval history is first and foremost about the world God made, its origins, inhabitants, purposes, challenges, and failures. It asks why the world which God has made is so imperfect and of the meaning of human violence and evil, and its solutions involve the notions of covenant, law, and forgiveness. The Genesis creation narrative (Genesis 1–2) deals with God's creation and God's repentance is the rationale behind the flood narrative, and in the Priestly source (which runs through all of Genesis and into the other four books of the Torah) these two verbs, "create" and "forgive", are reserved exclusively for divine actions.

Intertextuality is the way biblical stories refer to and reflect one another. Such echoes are seldom coincidental—for instance, the word used for ark is the same used for the basket in which Moses is saved, implying a symmetry between the stories of two divinely chosen saviours in a world threatened by water and chaos. The most significant such echo is a reversal of the Genesis creation narrative; the division between the "waters above" and the "waters below" the earth is removed, the dry land is flooded, most life is destroyed, and only Noah and those with him survive to obey God's command to "be fruitful and multiply."

The flood is a reversal and renewal of God's creation of the world. Bandstra pictures the destruction of creation as a return to the universe's pre-creation state of watery chaos so that it can be remade through the microcosm of Noah's Ark. In Genesis 1 God separated the "waters above the earth" from those below so that dry land can appear as a home for living things, but in the flood story the "windows of heaven" and "fountains of the deep" are opened so that the world is returned to the watery chaos of the time before creation. Even the sequence of flood events mimics that of creation, the flood first covering the earth to the highest mountains, then destroying, in order, birds, cattle, beasts, "swarming creatures", and finally mankind. (Note: This order parallels the Babylonian flood story in the Epic of Gilgamesh, where at the end of rain "all of mankind had returned to clay", the substance from which they had been made.) The Ark itself is likewise a microcosm of Solomon's Temple.

== Later traditions ==
=== Jewish ===
In Jewish folklore, the sins in the antediluvian world included blasphemy, occult practices and preventing new traders from making profit. Children also had the ability to talk and walk immediately after birth and battle with demons.

When the flood commenced, God caused each raindrop to pass through Gehenna before it fell on earth for forty days so that it could scald the skin of sinners. It was a punishment that befitted their crime because like the rain, humanity's sensual desires made them hot and inflamed to immoral excesses.

=== Christianity ===
The Genesis flood narrative is included in the Old Testament of the Christian Bible (see Books of the Bible). The teachings of Jesus and the apostles on the Genesis flood narrative are also recorded in several New Testament writings (parallel Gospel readings in Matthew 24:37-39 and Luke 17:26-27, and then in 1 Peter 3:20, 2 Peter 2:5, 2 Peter 3:6 and Hebrews 11:7). The gospel accounts focus on the experience of those who were "thoughtless" about the flood, "though they had warning of it", and who perished.

Some Christian biblical scholars suggest that the flood is a picture of salvation in Christ—the Ark was planned by God and there is only one way of salvation through the door of the Ark, akin to one way of salvation through Christ. Additionally, some scholars, commenting on the teaching of the apostle Peter (1 Peter 3:18–22), connect the Ark with the resurrection of Christ, the waters burying the old world but raising Noah to a new life. Other Christian scholars also highlight that 1 Peter 3:18–22 demonstrates the Genesis flood as a type to Christian baptism.

=== Gnosticism ===
In the 3rd century Gnostic codex now referred to as the Hypostasis of the Archons, it is the corrupt rulers (Archons) who decide to flood the world in order to dispose of most of mankind. However, Noah is spared and told to build an ark. But when his wife Norea wants to board the ark, Noah attempts to not let her, thus she uses her divine power to blow on the ark, causing it to be consumed by fire. Noah later builds the ark a second time. When the Archons try to seize Norea, she calls out to God for help, then the angel Eleleth appears and scares away the Archons, revealing to Norea that she is a divine child of the great spirit. A different view is found in the Secret Book of John; instead of an ark, Noah hides in a bright cloud.

=== Mandaeism ===
Mandaeism teaches that the flood of Noah was the last of three events where the world's population was reduced to a single family. Thirty generations after Adam, most of the population was killed by pestilence and war, leaving only Ram and his wife Rud. Twenty-five generations later, most of the population was killed by fire, leaving only Shurbai and his wife Sharhabeil. Fifteen generations later, most of the population was killed by flood, leaving only Noah and Shem, in addition to the latter's wife Nuraitha. Noah and his family are saved because they were able to build an ark or kawila (or kauila, a Mandaic term; it is cognate with Syriac kēʾwilā, which is attested in the Peshitta New Testament, such as Matthew 24:38 and Luke 17:27).

=== Islam ===
The story of Noah and the Great Flood is related in the Qur'an in the surah Nūḥ.

== Historicity ==
Numerous academic scholars and researchers consider the story in its present form to be exaggerated and/or implausible. The story of the Deluge describes either a severe genetic bottleneck event or the origins of a founder effect among the descendants of the survivors, in that the survivors are related. There is no evidence of such a severe genetic bottleneck at that period of time (~2,500 BC) either among humans or other animal species; however, if the flood narrative is derived from a more localized event and describes a founder effect among one population of humans, certain explanations such as the events described by the Black Sea deluge hypothesis may elaborate on the historicity of the flood narrative; other authors point out that the inundation of the ancient Ur Schatt river basin, which is now under the Persian Gulf, would be a more proximate source for the Biblical, Akkadian, and Sumerian flood accounts.

Localized catastrophic floodings have left traces in the geological record: the Channeled Scablands in the southeastern areas of the state of Washington have been demonstrated to have been formed by a series of catastrophic floods originating from the collapse of glacial dams of glacial lakes in the region, the last of which has been estimated to have occurred between 18,200 and 14,000 years ago.

Another geologic feature believed to have been formed by massive catastrophic flooding is the Tsangpo Gorge in Tibet. As with the Channeled Scablands of the state of Washington, breakthroughs of glacial ice dams are believed to have unleashed massive and sudden torrents of water to form the gorge some time between 600 and 900 AD.

Some also relate the climate change phenomena associated with the Piora Oscillation, which triggered the collapse of the Uruk period, with the Biblical flood myth.

The current understanding of the prehistoric cataclysmic flooding from the Altai Mountains is that several glacial lake outburst floods from the Altai Mountains caused massive flooding along the Katun River (in the present-day Altai Republic) some time between 12000 BC and 9000 BC, as demonstrated by the fact that much of the gravel deposited along the Katun valley lacks a stratigraphic structure, instead showing characteristics of a deposition directly after suspension in a turbulent flow.

In 2020, archaeologists discovered evidence of a tsunami that destroyed middle Pre-Pottery Neolithic B coastal settlements in Tel Dor, Israel, as it traveled between 3.5 and 1.5 km inland. The tsunami was approximately 16 m high. Recovery in the affected areas was slow but overall, it did not significantly affect the social development of the southern Levant. While the tsunami is not identified with the biblical flood, it is believed to contribute to the flood myths found in numerous cultures.

=== Flood geology ===
The development of scientific geology had a profound impact on attitudes towards the biblical flood narrative by undermining the biblical chronology, which placed the Creation and the flood no more than a few thousand years back in history. In 1823 the English theologian and natural scientist William Buckland interpreted geological phenomena as Reliquiæ Diluvianæ (relics of the flood) "Attesting the Action of an Universal Deluge". His views were supported by others at the time, including the influential geologist Adam Sedgwick, but by 1830 Sedgwick considered that the evidence suggested only local floods. Louis Agassiz subsequently explained such deposits as the results of glaciation.

In 1862, William Thomson (later to become Lord Kelvin) calculated the age of the Earth at between 24 million and 400 million years, and for the remainder of the 19th century, discussion focused not on the viability of this theory of deep time, but on the derivation of a more precise figure for the age of the Earth. Lux Mundi, an 1889 volume of theological essays which marks a stage in the acceptance of a more critical approach to scripture, took the stance that readers should rely on the gospels as completely historical, but should not take the earlier chapters of Genesis literally. By a variety of independent means, scientists have since determined that the Earth is approximately 4.54 billion years old.

Flood geology (a pseudoscience which contradicts a number of principles and discoveries of fact in the fields of geology, stratigraphy, geophysics, physics, paleontology, biology, anthropology, and archaeology in an attempt to interpret and reconcile geological features on Earth in accordance with a literal understanding of the Genesis flood narrative) can be traced to "Scriptural geologists," a heterogeneous group of writers from the early 19th century, most of whom lacked any background in geology and also lacked influence even in religious circles. The geologic views of these writers were ignored by the scientific community of their time.

Flood geology was largely ignored in the 19th century, but was revived in the 20th century by the Seventh-day Adventist George McCready Price, who was inspired by the visions of Ellen G. White. As Price's career progressed, he gained attention outside of Seventh-day Adventist groups, and by 1929 he was a popular scientific author among Christian fundamentalists, though those who were not Seventh-day Adventists rejected his young Earth theories. Through the middle of the 20th century, despite debates between Protestant Christian scientists, Flood geology maintained traction amongst evangelical Christian circles. Historian Ronald Numbers argues that an ideological connection by evangelical Christians wanting to challenge aspects of the scientific consensus that they believe contradict their interpretation of religious texts was first established by the publication of the 1961 book, The Genesis Flood.

Most scientific fields, particularly those contradicted by flood geology, rely on Charles Lyell's established principle of uniformitarianism, which for much of their history was seen to contrast with the catastrophism inherent in flood geology. However, with the discovery of evidence for some catastrophic events, events similar to those on which the flood narrative may be based are accepted as possible within an overall uniformitarian framework. In relation to geological forces, uniformitarianism explains the formation of the Earth's features by means of mostly slow-acting forces seen in operation today.

=== Species distribution ===
By the 17th century, believers in the Genesis account faced the issue of reconciling the exploration of the New World and increased awareness of the global distribution of species with the older scenario whereby all life had sprung from a single point of origin on the slopes of Mount Ararat. The obvious answer involved mankind spreading over the continents following the destruction of the Tower of Babel and taking animals along, yet some of the results seemed peculiar. In 1646 Sir Thomas Browne wondered why the natives of North America had taken rattlesnakes with them, but not horses: "How America abounded with Beasts of prey and noxious Animals, yet contained not in that necessary Creature, a Horse, is very strange".

Browne, among the first to question the notion of spontaneous generation, was a medical doctor and amateur scientist making this observation in passing. However, biblical scholars of the time, such as Justus Lipsius (1547–1606) and Athanasius Kircher (c. 1601 – c. 1680), had also begun to subject the Ark story to rigorous scrutiny as they attempted to harmonize the biblical account with the growing body of natural historical knowledge. The resulting hypotheses provided an important impetus to the study of the geographical distribution of plants and animals, and indirectly spurred the emergence of biogeography in the 18th century. Natural historians began to draw connections between climates and the animals and plants adapted to them. One influential theory held that the biblical Ararat was striped with varying climatic zones, and as climate changed, the associated animals moved as well, eventually spreading to repopulate the globe.

There was also the problem of an ever-expanding number of known species: for Kircher and earlier natural historians, there was little problem finding room for all known animal species in the Ark. Less than a century later, discoveries of new species made it increasingly difficult to justify a literal interpretation for the Ark story. By the middle of the 18th century, only a few natural historians accepted a literal interpretation of the narrative.

== See also ==
- Biblical cosmology
- Chronology of the Bible
- Documentary hypothesis
- Mosaic authorship
- Noach (parsha)
- Panbabylonism
