= Primeval history =

First eleven chapters of the Book of Genesis

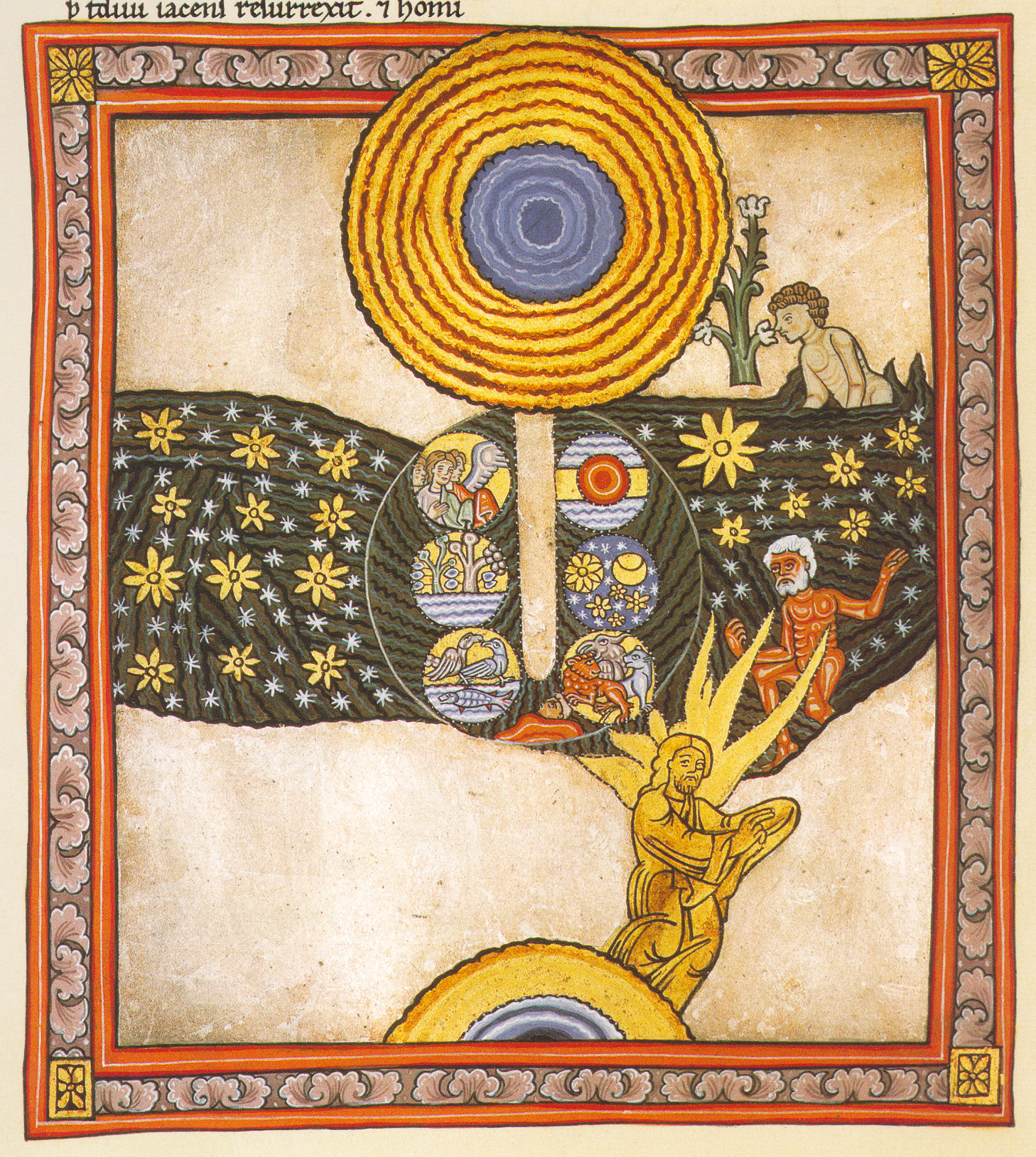
The six days of creation as represented by Hildegard of Bingen

The primeval history is the name given by biblical scholars to the first eleven chapters of the Book of Genesis in the Hebrew Bible. These chapters convey the story of the first years of the world's existence.

The body of material tells how God created the world and all its beings and placed the first man and woman (Adam and Eve) in the Garden of Eden, how the first couple were expelled from God's presence, of the first murder which followed, and God's decision to destroy the world and save only the righteous Noah and his sons; a new humanity then descended from these sons and spread throughout the world, but, although the new world was as sinful as the old, God resolved never again to destroy the world by flood, and the history ended with Terah, the father of Abraham, from whom descended God's chosen people.

The primeval history is generally considered to have been completed along with the rest of the Book of Genesis in the 5th century BCE, but a sizeable minority of scholars have dated it to the 3rd century BCE, pointing to discontinuities between the contents of the work and other parts of the Hebrew Bible.

== Structure and content ==
The history contains some of the best-known stories in the Bible plus a number of genealogies, structured around the five-fold repetition of the toledot formula ("These are the generations of..."):

- The toledot of heaven and earth (Genesis 1:1–4:26)
  - The Genesis creation narrative (the combined Hexameron or six-"day" (Note: A day is the period of time it takes for the Earth to complete one revolution on its axis (approximately 24 hours). However, in the first creation story the Earth is not created until the third stage of the process. The Earth therefore did not exist for the first two stages, so the concept of a day did not exist for the first two stages.) cosmic creation-story of Genesis 1 and the human-focused creation-story of Genesis 2)
  - The Eden narrative
  - The Cain and Abel narrative
- The book of the toledot of Adam (5:1–6:8) (The Hebrew includes the word "book")
  - the first of two genealogies of Genesis, the Kenites, descendants of Cain, who invent various aspects of civilised life
  - the second genealogy, the descendants of Seth the third son of Adam, whose line leads to Noah and to Abraham
  - the Sons of God who couple with the "daughters of men"; the Nephilim, "men of renown"; God's reasons for destroying the world (first account)
- The toledot of Noah (6–9:28)
  - God's reasons for bringing the Flood (second account), his warning to Noah, and the construction of the Ark
  - the Genesis flood narrative in which the world is destroyed and re-created
  - God's covenant with Noah, in which God promises never again to destroy the world by water
  - Noah the husbandman (the invention of wine), his drunkenness, his three sons, and the Curse of Canaan
- The toledot of the sons of Noah (10:1–11:9)
  - the Table of Nations (the sons of Noah and the origins of the nations of the world) and how they came to be scattered across the Earth through the Tower of Babel
- The toledot of Shem (11:10–26)
  - the descendants of Noah in the line of Shem to Terah, the father of Abraham

== Composition history ==
=== Sources in Genesis ===
Scholars generally agree that the Torah, the collection of five books of which Genesis is the first, achieved something like its current form in the 5th century BCE. However, the almost complete absence of all the characters and incidents mentioned in the Primeval history from the rest of the Hebrew Bible has led a sizeable minority of scholars to conclude that these chapters were composed much later than those that follow, possibly in the 3rd century BC.

Genesis draws on a number of distinct "sources", including the Priestly source, the Yahwist and the Elohist – the last two are often referred to collectively as "non-Priestly", but the Elohist is not present in the primeval history and "non-Priestly" and "Yahwist" can be regarded here as interchangeable terms. The following table is based on Robert Kugler and Patrick Hartin, "An Introduction to the Bible", 2009:

Verse	Priestly	Yahwist
1:1–2:4a	Creation story A	—N/a
2:4b–4:26	—N/a	Creation story B; Garden of Eden; Cain and Abel
5:1–24	Descendants of Adam	—N/a
6:1–8	—N/a	Nephilim; Reason for the Flood
6:9–13	Reason for the Flood	—N/a
6:14–8:22	Flood; Renewal after Flood	
9:1–17	—N/a	Noahide covenant
9:18–27	—N/a	Noah's drunkenness; Sons of Noah; Curse of Canaan
10:1–32	Table of Nations	
11:1–9	—N/a	Tower of Babel
11:10–32	Descendants of Noah	—N/a

=== Relationship of the primeval history to Genesis 12–50 ===
Genesis 1–11 shows little relationship to the remainder of Genesis. For example, the names of its characters and its geography – Adam (man) and Eve (life), the Land of Nod ("Wandering"), and so on – are symbolic rather than real, and much of the narratives consist of lists of "firsts": the first murder, the first wine, the first empire-builder. Most notably, almost none of the persons, places and stories in it are ever mentioned anywhere else in the Bible. This has led some scholars to suppose that the history forms a late composition attached to Genesis and the Pentateuch to serve as an introduction. Just how late is a subject for debate: at one extreme are those who see it as a product of the Hellenistic period, in which case it cannot be earlier than the first decades of the 4th century BCE; on the other hand the Yahwist source has been dated by some scholars, notably John Van Seters, to the exilic pre-Persian period (the 6th century BCE) precisely because the primeval history contains so much Babylonian influence in the form of myth. (Note: See John Van Seters, "Prologue to History: The Yahwist as Historian in Genesis (1992), pp.80, 155–56.) David M. Carr argues that the latest edition of the pre-Priestly version of the narratives probably dates to the mid-7th century BCE, during the period of Neo-Assyrian hegemony.

=== Influence of other mythologies ===
Numerous Mesopotamian and Egyptian myths are reflected in the primeval history. The myth of Atrahasis, for example, was the first to reference a global flood, and is thought to have contributed to the development of the Genesis flood narrative. The following table sets out the likely myths behind various Biblical narratives.

Bible story	Mesopotamian (Egyptian) myth
Genesis creation narrative: Genesis 1	Enuma Elish, the Babylonian creation myth, has a very similar opening to Genesis 1, refers to such entities as the "Deep" (Hebrew Tehom), arrives at a cosmology very similar to the one in Genesis 1:6, and shows a similar concern for reckoning time through the creation of heavenly bodies. God's creation of mankind in his image also recalls Mesopotamian myths, as does man's sovereignty over nature. In addition, the way God creates through the spoken word in Genesis 1 mirrors the Egyptian Memphite Theology in which the god Ptah creates the world through speech.
Genesis creation narrative: Genesis 2	The Atrahasis epic tells how the gods created mankind from dust
Garden of Eden	The god and goddess Enki and Ninhursag enjoyed a Tree of Life; the serpent in Genesis recalls the god Apsu in the Enuma Elish.
Cain and Abel	Cain and Abel are paralleled by the gods Dumuzi and Enkimdu
Genealogies	The Sumerian King List, like the list of the descendants of Cain, explains the origin of the elements of civilisation. Enoch, seventh in the line of Adam and taken by God, mirrors the king Enmerduranki and the sage Utuabzu, also seventh in their lines, taken to dwell with the gods.
Genesis flood narrative	The great deluge is told in a number of versions beginning in the early 2nd millennium; like the later Genesis myth, they tell how humanity survives through one hero and his family.
Tower of Babel (Genesis 11)	While there is no Mesopotamian myth associated with the Tower of Babel, there is scholarly agreement that Babylonian ziggurats, or tower-temples, lie behind this story.

== Themes and theology ==
=== Creation, destruction and re-creation ===
The history tells how God creates a world which is good (each action within Genesis 1 ends with God marking it as good), and how evil contaminates it through disobedience (the Eden story) and violence (Cain and Abel).

=== Chronology ===
The Genesis creation narrative marks the start of the Biblical chronology, the elaborate system of markers, both hidden and overt, marking off a fictive 4000 year history of the world. (Note: "How much history lies behind the story of Genesis? Because the action of the primeval story is not represented as taking place on the plane of ordinary human history and has so many affinities with ancient mythology, it is very far-fetched to speak of its narratives as historical at all." Levenson, 2004, pp.155–56.) From Creation to Abraham, time is calculated by adding the ages of the Patriarchs when their first child is born. It seems possible that the period of the Flood is not meant to be included in the count – for example, Shem, born 100 years before the Flood, had his first son two years after it, which should make him 102, but Genesis 11:10–11 specifies that he is only 100, suggesting that time has been suspended. The period from the birth of Shem's third son Arpachshad (in the second year after the Flood) to Abraham's migration to Canaan is 365 years, mirroring Enoch's life-span of 365 years, the number of days in a year. There are 10 Patriarchs between Adam and the Flood and 10 between the Flood and Abraham – the Septuagint adds an extra ancestor so that the second group is 10 from the Flood to Terah. Noah and Terah each have three sons, of whom the first in each case is the most important.

== See also ==
- Allegorical interpretations of Genesis
- Framework interpretation (Genesis)
