= Interpretations of Genesis =

The Book of Genesis has been interpreted in many ways, including literally, religiously, and allegorically.

== Religious interpretations ==
The Book of Genesis is regarded as a religious text by several faiths, including Judaism, Christianity, and Islam. Many adherents of those faiths interpret Genesis literally, while others interpret it as a metaphor or symbolism. Joseph Ratzinger, who would later become Pope Benedict XVI, articulates a Roman Catholic perspective, rejecting a literalism that would see Genesis interpreted as speaking about reality like “physics and biology.” Rejecting an approach that would, in his mind, by emphasising only the general messages of the text “imply that the individual passages of the Bible sink into meaninglessness,” he presents a symbolic hermeneutic for the text.

"They represent truth in the way that symbols do — just as, for example, a Gothic window gives us a deep insight into reality, thanks to the effects of light that it produces and to the figures that it portrays."

Ratzinger brings specific attention to the numerology of the narrative, finding echoes for the Ten Commandments and the Sabbath, drawing out an under girding message of the inherent nature of the creation to worship, as per the Ten Commandments, and to do so rhythmically, as per the Sabbath.

== Allegorical interpretation ==
The Book of Genesis is considered by many to be an allegorical source of morality and ethics. A readily available example of this is an allegorical interpretation the book's description of days passing during creation. An allegorical conclusion of the passage may conclude that these were not 24-hour periods because stars were only created on the fourth day. A 'phase' interpretation as the one described is commonly used as the basis for Old Earth creationism.

== Literal interpretation ==
The Book of Genesis is often interpreted to be a factual and historical account of how the earth was created by the Judeo-Christian-Islamic God, and the earliest accounts of mankind. Groups such as Answers in Genesis and individuals such as Ken Ham and Kent Hovind use this belief to critique modern scientific theories regarding evolution, the age of the Earth, and various aspects of physical cosmology.

== Interpretation as ancient literature ==
The Book of Genesis is interpreted as a collection of various documents that were written by different people at different times and were collected, translated, and edited by several editors at different times centuries later. Each editor, working from what to them were ancient source documents, combined material, omitted other material, added glosses and made changes to parts they believed were errors.

== Interpretation as a literary text ==
Looking past historical critical concerns, such as the compositional history of the text, this approach is instead based on the following assumptions:

1. The Genesis text analyzed is the current traditional manuscript.

2. The text, for the purpose of literary analysis, is regarded as having been written by an "author" who is responsible for the final version of the text. The literary reading, therefore, relates to what is expressed in the current form of the text, assuming its unity.

3. The text is examined as a narrative free of prejudices about its assumed literary nature or religious orientation. God, therefore, is but a literary persona in it.

4. Analysis of the protagonists and their acts are carried out with no prejudices about an assumed cultural 'Sitz im Leben'.

== Bibliography ==
- R. Gilboa, Intercourses in the Book of Genesis; Mythic Motifs in Creator-Created Relationships, Lewes: Book Guild, 1998. ISBN 978-1857762327
