= Local flood theory =

Theory concerning Genesis flood narrative

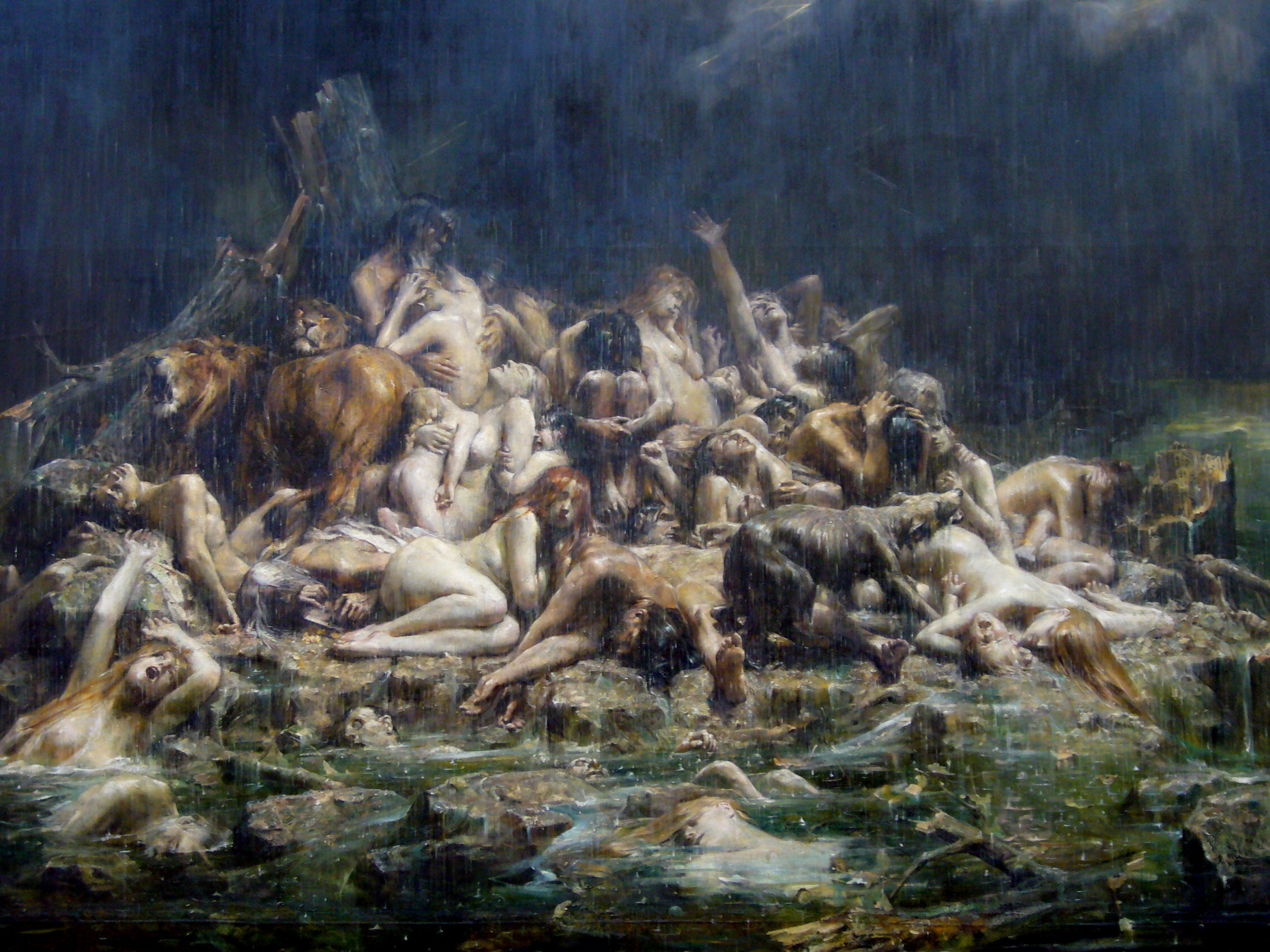
The Flood of Noah and Companions (c. 1911) by Léon Comerre. Musée d'Arts de Nantes.

The local flood theory (also known as the limited flood theory) is an interpretation of the Genesis flood narrative where the flood of Noah is interpreted as a local event, generally located in Mesopotamia, instead of a global event.

== Background and history ==
=== 19th century ===
The local flood interpretation of Noah's flood became accepted by many Christians after 19th century scientific findings. The view was defended by 19th century Scottish geologist Charles Lyell, in his book Principles of Geology (1833), where he concluded that the Genesis flood must have been a regional affair and not a global deluge.

=== Creationist views ===
Young Earth Creationist organizations such as Answers in Genesis and the Institute for Creation Research have criticized a local flood theory as faulty exegesis; they state that the Genesis flood covered the whole of the earth.

Some Old Earth creationists reject flood geology, a position which leaves them open to accusations that they thereby reject the inerrancy of Scripture. In response, Old Earth creationists cite verses in the Bible where the words "whole" and "all" clearly require a contextual interpretation. For example, Old Earth creationist Hugh Ross has defended the local flood theory; he promotes the view in his book, Navigating Genesis.

== Academic views ==
There exists geological evidence that a large local flood happened in ancient Mesopotamia; recent studies have shown that there is some geographic evidence supporting the possibility of a large flood originating in the Black Sea either caused by an inflow of water from the Mediterranean or a flood during the late glacial period connecting black and Mediterranean Sea. Additionally, extra-biblical writings from ancient Mesopotamia like Atra-Hasis and the Epic of Gilgamesh also feature catastrophic flooding, substantiating the claim that such a flood could have been the event that inspired these narratives.
