= Joshua Berman =

American rabbi, biblical scholar, and professor (b. 1964)

Joshua A. Berman (Hebrew: יהושע ברמן; born February 29, 1964) is an Orthodox rabbi and professor of bible at Bar-Ilan University. He is known for his views on the history of Jewish belief, and on biblical source criticism, arguing that "knowledge of the cultural context of the ancient Near East" is required in understanding the scriptures.

Berman earned his A.B. at Princeton University in 1987 and his PhD at Bar-Ilan University in 2002. He studied at Yeshivat Har Etzion for eight years. Before completing his PhD, Berman taught Bible at the Nishmat Midrasha for several years.

Berman is a frequent contributor to Mosaic Magazine, a magazine for Jewish ideas, religion, politics, and culture, and has written there on a variety of topics including most commonly the Israelite exodus out of Egypt and the current state of biblical studies, where he has drawn both agreement and disagreement from other scholars.

Berman began as a strong proponent of the documentary hypothesis and late Persian authorship, but became convinced of the reliability of the Hebrew Bible after years of research.

== Publications ==
- Created Equal: How the Bible Broke with Ancient Political Thought, Oxford University Press
- The Temple: Its Symbolism and Meaning Then and Now, (2010) Wipf & Stock Publishers, ISBN 978-1608997763
- Narrative Analogy in the Hebrew Bible: Battle Stories and their Equivalent Non-battle Narratives, Brill
- Inconsistency in the Torah: Ancient Literary Convention and the Limits of Source Criticism, (2017) Oxford University Press
- Ani Maamin: Biblical Criticism, Historical Truth, and the Thirteen Principles of Faith, 2020, ISBN 978-1592645381
- Umberto Cassuto (2006). Joshua Berman (ed.). The Documentary Hypothesis and the Composition of the Pentateuch. Translated by Israel Abrahams. Shalem Press. ISBN 978-965-7052-35-8.
