= Ur Schatt =

Ice Age-era river now submerged by the Persian Gulf

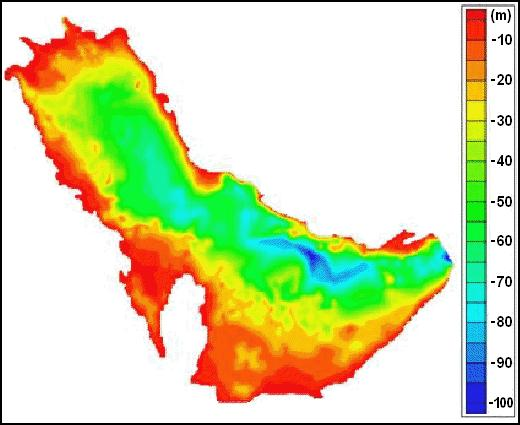
Persian Gulf Bathymetry, showing (cyan to dark blue) course of Ur Schatt and Arabian Oasis flood plain.

The Ur Schatt was an ancient river system that fed and flowed through the Gulf Oasis, a Late Pleistocene/Early Holocene flood plain made up of a series of deep lake systems that would flood as the Pleistocene Ice Age ended and global sea levels rose some 150 metres between 12,000 BCE and 7,000 BCE, forming the Persian Gulf.

== Extent ==
The Gulf basin was a wedge-shaped depression bordered to the west by the Arabian Peninsula, the east (where it was deepest) by the Zagros Mountains and to the north by the Mesopotamian flood plain. From the north, where it was fed by the Euphrates, Tigris and Karun rivers (the modern Shatt Al Arab), the water system of the Ur Schatt flowed some 1,000 Km, joined by a series of lakes, to the present day Strait of Hormuz, where it would likely have been constrained by silt deposits, and into the Gulf of Oman. Flow from the Zagros Mountains and the Wadi Al Batin into the Ur Schatt would have been joined by water flowing from aquifers on the Arabian coast, still attested today as freshwater outlets in the saline waters of the Persian Gulf. Pearl divers have long held that there are locations in the sea where a bucket could be upended and brought to the surface containing fresh water. The outline of the Ur Schatt and its lake system is visible in modern bathymetry.

It is likely the Ur Schatt was a slow-flowing system and that the flooding of the Gulf Oasis would have introduced a creeping salinity throughout the flood plain in the fastest of the global Holocene transgressions, some 10 metres per year. The fastest rate of transgression is believed to have taken place between 10,000 and 9,000 BCE. It is believed to have fed a fertile valley, with abundant vegetation and wildlife and home to early human communities of Neolithic hunter gatherers who would have gradually been forced out of the valley by the incursion of saline waters.

The Persian Gulf today is a shallow sea, never more than 140 metres in depth and frequently, particularly off its southern and northern shores – less than 25 metres deep. By approximately 3,500 BCE, the Gulf had flooded to levels approximately to its current shores.

== Flooding ==
In the Last Glacial Maximum, from 21000 to 18000 BP, the entire Persian Gulf was exposed land (some 100.000 km2), as the world's sea level was by then 120 meters below the actual level.

After the LGM, the ice caps melted and by 14000 BP the Indian Ocean transgressed the Persian Gulf, flooding first the Strait of Hormuz.

In the next 4000 years the sea level rose up from -105 to -30; being the most rapid rise around 12000 BP (from -100 to -75), flooding 500 km in a westward direction in some 500 years.

From 10000 to 8000 BP the sea level was rising at a more slow pace, allowing the formation of peat layers which are evidence of estuaries and marshes. By 8500 BP the sea level in the Persian Gulf was 20 meters below the actual. By 8000 BP the first human occupations are recorded in southern Mesopotamia (the neolithic Ubaid period).

By 6000 BP the shoreline reached almost the same level as today, except an additional introgression of the Indian Ocean some 250 km inland (reaching the shoreline where it is nowadays Nasiriyah). It was after several centuries of sedimentation that the actual marshy Euphrates-Tigris delta was formed. This ancient introgression, which would imply a reduction of the available agricultural land, may be related with the start of the Uruk period.

== Human settlement ==
Contemporaneous with the fastest period of the flooding of the Gulf Oasis, there is evidence of large numbers of human settlements around the basin, with archaeological evidence from over 60 sites around the Middle Holocene shoreline. These Neolithic people practised fishing, date palm cultivation and animal husbandry. It is notable that the archaeological record in this area prior to this period is scant, pointing to the idea of a population displaced from the fertile valley by the transgression from the Indian Ocean.

The emergence of Sumerian urban communities around 5,000 BCE has been linked to the flooding of the Gulf Oasis and the climatic changes of the time favouring economic and agricultural specialisation and the formation of communities with social and political hierarchies. These communities were linked to those of Southeastern Arabia, with archaeological evidence of both Ubaid and Jemdet Nasr era pottery finds around the shores of the Gulf. Arabian Bifacial tools have been found alongside distinctively Ubaid era ceramics in the United Arab Emirates and Oman, which have been traced to a Sumerian origin (using petrographic analysis). The continuation of these links is directly connected to the second millennium emergence of Sumerian linked trading communities, recorded by the Sumerians at Dilmun (Bahrain) and Magan (the United Arab Emirates and Oman).
