= Lawrence Boadt =

Lawrence Edward Boadt, C.S.P. (October 26, 1942 – July 24, 2010), was an American Paulist priest and Biblical scholar, who advocated on behalf of improved communication and understanding between Christians and Jews.

== Life ==
Boadt was born in Los Angeles, California, on October 26, 1942. After high school, he entered the novitiate of the Paulist Fathers in Vineland, New Jersey, where he made his initial promises as a member of the congregation on September 8, 1962. He then earned bachelor's and master's degrees from St. Paul's College in Washington, D.C., the house of formation for the Paulist Fathers. He received ordination as a priest in 1969 and then attended The Catholic University of America, where he was awarded a master's degree and a Licentiate in Theology. At the Pontifical Biblical Institute in Rome, Boadt was granted a licentiate in Sacred Scripture and a Doctorate in Biblical Studies and Near Eastern languages. He taught at Fordham University, St. John's University and at the Washington Theological Union.

Boadt was selected to serve as the scripture editor of the Paulist Press, a publishing house established by the Paulist Fathers in 1881. His 1984 book Reading the Old Testament: An Introduction was intended to explain the Old Testament to Christians. He deeply believed in the principle that Christians could best understand their faith by studying Judaism and suggested that Christians "could gain some feeling for the Old Testament by attending a Friday night Sabbath service at a local temple or synagogue". Other books he authored include the 1980 work Ezekiel's Oracles Against Egypt: A Literary and Philological Study of Ezekiel 29-32, the 1986 book Introduction to Wisdom Literature, Proverbs and the 1999 text Why I Am a Priest: Thirty Success Stories. Boadt noted that he oversaw the 2003 publishing of Moses: A Memoir by Joel Cohen, saying that the imprint receives many books that were "too Jewish" for a Catholic readership, but that this book struck the right balance. He was named President of the Paulist Press in 1998, holding that position until shortly before his death and overseeing the publishing of an average of 80 books annually.

== Death ==
Boadt died of cancer at age 67 on July 24, 2010, at his home in Mahwah, New Jersey. His remains were buried in the Paulist Fathers' section of St. Thomas the Apostle Church Cemetery in Oak Ridge, New Jersey. Rabbi Eric J. Greenberg of the Anti-Defamation League cited Boadt's efforts "to develop a historic new positive relationship between Christians and Jews" through his publishing efforts that helped promote the vision of the Second Vatican Council, the 1962-1965 world council of Catholic bishops that rejected antisemitism and the deicide charge against Jews.
