= David M. Carr =

American biblical scholar

David McLain Carr is Professor of Old Testament at the Union Theological Seminary in New York City. He is a leading scholar of the textual formation of the Hebrew Bible.

Carr received his B.A. from Carleton College in 1980, his M.T.S., from the Candler School of Theology at Emory University in 1983, and his Ph.D. from Claremont Graduate School in 1988.

Joshua Berman describes Carr's The Formation of the Hebrew Bible: A New Reconstruction as a "convention-smashing" book in its use of epigraphic evidence to demonstrate that "many of the forms of editing routinely hypothesized by source critics of the Torah were not employed anywhere else in the ancient Near East." Formation is considered a significant contribution to the empirical side of biblical source criticism.

In Holy Resilience: The Bible’s Traumatic Origins Carr, a Quaker and a committed pacifist, argues that the Old Testament was composed by the Jews in exile in Babylon and reflects their suffering as an exiled and oppressed minority group; and the Christian Bible was likewise shaped by the unspeakable shame of having a crucified savior. The book has received positive blurbs from biblical scholars like Israel Finkelstein, Daniel L. Smith-Christopher and Walter Brueggemann, however, Carr's argument has been criticized by Joshua Berman for ignoring that the Hebrew Bible was written in pre-exilic Hebrew that would have been impossible for scribes in the period of the Babylonian exile to replicate.

== Works ==
=== Thesis ===
- Carr, David M. (1988). Royal Ideology and the Technology of Faith: a comparative midrash study of 1 Kgs. 3:2-15 (Ph.D.). Claremont Graduate School. OCLC 20591573.

=== Books ===
- Carr, David M. (1991). From D to Q: A Study of Early Jewish Interpretations of Solomon's Dream at Gibeon. Society of Biblical Literature monograph series. Vol. 44. Atlanta, GA: Scholars Press. ISBN 978-1-555-40528-1. OCLC 24380332. - thoroughly revised version of Ph.D. Thesis
- ——— (1996). Reading the Fractures of Genesis: Historical and Literary Approaches. Louisville, KY: Westminster, John Knox Press. ISBN 978-0-664-22071-6. OCLC 33664323.
- ———; Weis, Richard D., eds. (1996). A gift of God in due season : essays on scripture and community in honor of James A. Sanders. Journal for the Study of the Old Testament, Supplement series. Vol. 225. Sheffield, England: Sheffield Academic Press. ISBN 978-1-850-75626-2. OCLC 37480916.
- ——— (2003). The Erotic Word: Sexuality, Spirituality and the Bible. New York: Oxford University Press. ISBN 978-0-195-15652-2. OCLC 50091614.
- ——— (2005). Writing on the Tablet of the Heart: Origins of Western Scripture and Literature. New York; Oxford: Oxford University Press. ISBN 978-0-195-17297-3. OCLC 54753370.
- ——— (2010). An Introduction to the Old Testament: sacred texts and imperial contexts of the Hebrew Bible. Chichester, West Sussex; Malden, MA: Wiley-Blackwell. ISBN 978-1-405-18468-7. OCLC 455419934.
- ——— (2011). The Formation of the Hebrew Bible: A New Reconstruction. New York: Oxford University Press. ISBN 978-0-199-74260-8. OCLC 671916759.
- ——— (2014). Holy Resilience: The Bible's Traumatic Origins. New Haven: Yale University Press. ISBN 978-0-300-20456-8. OCLC 877369828.
- ——— (2020). The Formation of Genesis 1-11: Biblical and Other Precursors. Oxford University Press. ISBN 978-0190062569.

=== Papers ===
- "Narrative and the real world: An argument for continuity", History and Theory (1986), pp. 117–131
- "Torah on the Heart: Literary Jewish Textuality Within Its Ancient Near Eastern Context" Oral Tradition (2010), pp.

=== Chapters ===
- ——— (1996). "Canonization in the Context of Community". In Weis, Richard D.; ——— (eds.). A gift of God in due season : essays on scripture and community in honor of James A. Sanders. Journal for the Study of the Old Testament, Supplement series. Vol. 225. Sheffield, England: Sheffield Academic Press. ISBN 978-1-850-75626-2. OCLC 37480916.
- ——— (2015). "The Formation of the Hebrew Bible: Sources, Compositional Layers, and Other Revisions". In Niditch, Susan (ed.). The Wiley Blackwell Companion to Ancient Israel. Wiley-Blackwell. ISBN 978-0470656778.
