= Historicity of the Bible =

Relationship between historic and biblical events

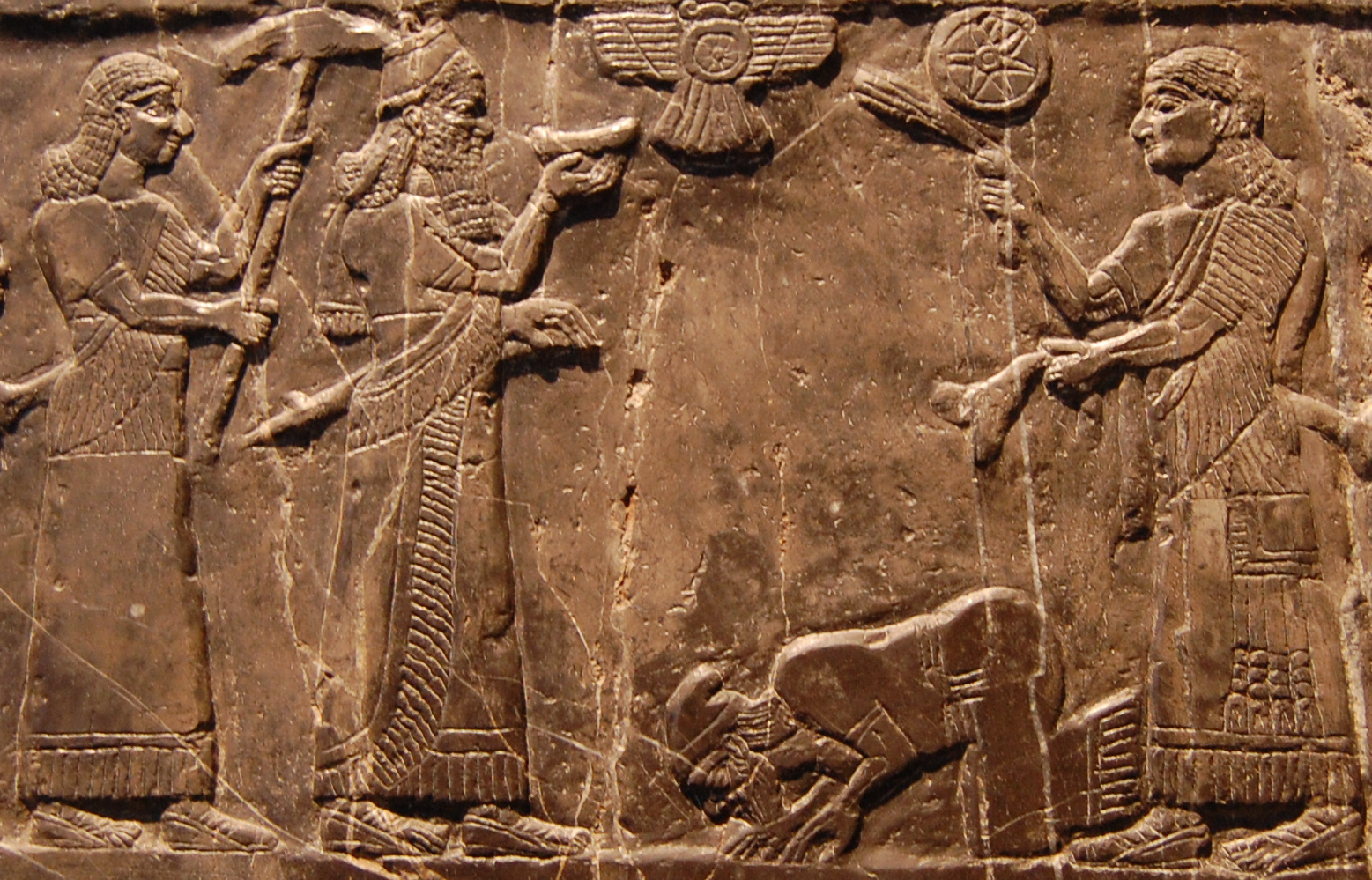
Jehu, the King of the Kingdom of Israel (Samaria) giving tribute to Shalmaneser III of Assyria; from the Black Obelisk of Shalmaneser III made in 827 BCE.

The historicity of the Bible is the question of the Bible's relationship to history—covering not just the Bible's acceptability as history but also the ability to understand the literary forms of biblical narrative. Questions on biblical historicity are typically separated into evaluations of whether the Old Testament and Hebrew Bible accurately record the history of ancient Israel and Judah and the second Temple period, and whether the Christian New Testament is an accurate record of the historical Jesus and of the Apostolic Age. This tends to vary depending upon the opinion of the scholar.

When studying the books of the Bible, scholars examine the historical context of passages, the importance ascribed to events by the authors, and the contrast between the descriptions of these events and other historical evidence. Being a collaborative work composed and redacted over the course of several centuries, the historicity of the Bible is not consistent throughout the entirety of its contents.

Scholars largely agree that much of the Hebrew Bible/Old Testament reflects a combination of historical memory, oral traditions, and later literary editing, with key events like the Patriarchs, Exodus, and United Monarchy either lacking strong archaeological evidence or reflecting a smaller-scale historical reality than the biblical narrative suggests. In regards to the New Testament, nearly all modern scholars accept that Jesus was a historical figure who was crucified under Pontius Pilate. However, narratives involving miracle claims and the resurrection are seen as being a matter of individual faith or lack thereof, with the precise historicity of the gospel and Acts accounts being a matter of ongoing scholarly debate. Scholars distinguish between storytelling devices and verifiable historical elements.

According to theologian Thomas L. Thompson, a representative of the Copenhagen School, also known as "biblical minimalism", the archaeological record lends sparse and indirect evidence for the Old Testament's narratives as history. Others, like archaeologist William G. Dever, felt that biblical archaeology has both confirmed and challenged the Old Testament stories. While Dever has criticized the Copenhagen School for its more radical approach, he is far from being a biblical literalist, and thinks that the purpose of biblical archaeology is not to simply support or discredit the biblical narrative, but to be a field of study in its own right. Some scholars argue that the Bible is national history, with an "imaginative entertainment factor that proceeds from artistic expression" or a "midrash" on history.

== Materials and methods ==
=== Manuscript and canons ===
The Bible exists in multiple manuscripts, none of them an autograph, and multiple biblical canons, which do not completely agree on which books have sufficient authority to be included or their order. The early discussions about the exclusion or integration of various apocrypha involve an early idea about the historicity of the core. The Ionian Enlightenment influenced early patrons like Justin Martyr and Tertullian—both saw the biblical texts as being different from (and having more historicity than) the myths of other religions. Augustine was aware of the difference between science and scripture and defended the historicity of the biblical texts, e.g., against claims of Faustus of Mileve.

Historians hold that the Bible should not be treated differently from other historical (or literary) sources from the ancient world. One may compare doubts about the historicity of, for example, Herodotus; the consequence of these discussions is not that historians would have to stop using ancient sources for historical reconstruction, but need to be aware of the problems involved when doing so.

Very few texts survive directly from antiquity: most have been copied—some, many times. To determine the accuracy of a copied manuscript, textual critics examine the way the transcripts have passed through history to their extant forms. The higher the consistency of the earliest texts, the greater their textual reliability, and the less chance that the content has been changed over the years. Multiple copies may also be grouped into text types, with some types judged closer to the hypothetical original than others.

=== Writing and reading history ===
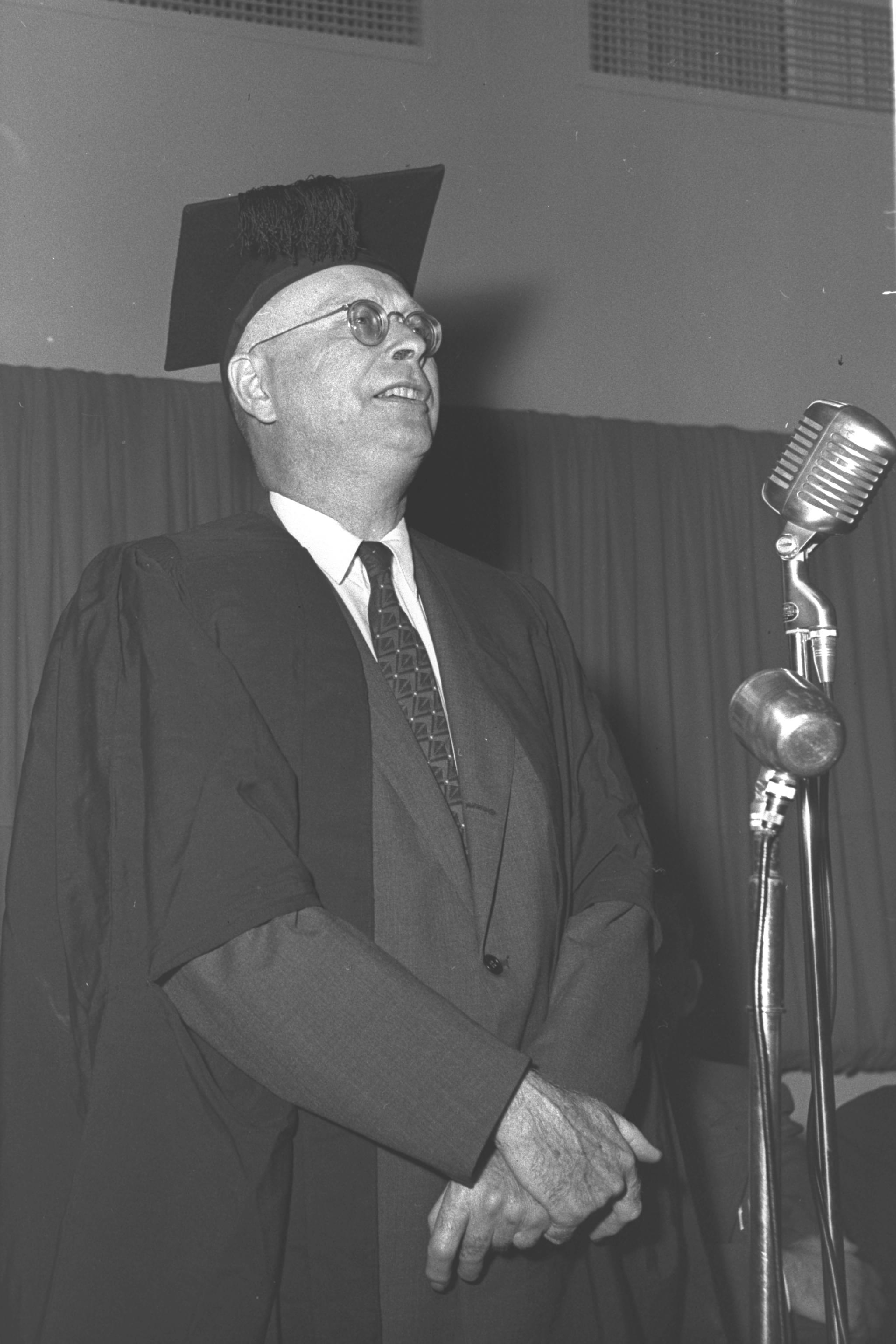
W.F. Albright, a biblical scholar and archaeologist, in 1957

The meaning of the term "history" is itself dependent on social and historical context. Paula McNutt, for instance, notes that the Old Testament narratives,

Do not record "history" in the sense that history is understood in the twentieth century. ...The past, for biblical writers as well as for twentieth-century readers of the Bible, has meaning only when it is considered in light of the present, and perhaps an idealized future.

— Paula M. McNutt, Reconstructing the society of ancient Israel, page 4

Even from the earliest times, students of religious texts had an awareness that parts of the scriptures could not be interpreted as a strictly consistent sequence of events. The Talmud cites a dictum ascribed to the third-century teacher Abba Arika that "there is no chronological order in the Torah". Examples were often presented and discussed in later Jewish exegesis with, according to Abraham Joshua Heschel (1907–1972), an ongoing discourse between those who would follow the views of Rabbi Ishmael (born 90 CE) that "the Torah speaks in human language", compared to the more mystical approach of Rabbi Akiva (c. 50–135) that any such deviations should signpost some deeper order or purpose, to be divined.

During the modern era, the focus of biblical history has also diversified. The project of biblical archaeology associated with W.F. Albright (1891–1971), which sought to validate the historicity of the events narrated in the Bible through the ancient texts and material remains of the Near East, has a more specific focus compared to the more expansive view of history described by archaeologist William Dever (b. 1933). In discussing the role of his discipline in interpreting the biblical record, Dever has pointed to multiple histories within the Bible, including the history of theology (the relationship between God and believers), political history (usually the account of "Great Men"), narrative history (the chronology of events), intellectual history (treating ideas and their development, context and evolution), socio-cultural history (institutions, including their social underpinnings in family, clan, tribe and social class and the state), cultural history (overall cultural evolution, demography, socio-economic and political structure and ethnicity), technological history (the techniques by which humans adapt to, exploit and make use of the resources of their environment), natural history (how humans discover and adapt to the ecological facts of their natural environment), and material history (artifacts as correlates of changes in human behaviour).

Sharply differing perspectives on the relationship between narrative history and theological meaning present a special challenge for assessing the historicity of the Bible. Supporters of biblical literalism "deny that Biblical infallibility and inerrancy are limited to spiritual, religious, or redemptive themes, exclusive of assertions in the fields of history and science. We further deny that scientific hypotheses about earth history may properly be used to overturn the teaching of Scripture on creation and the flood." "History", or specifically biblical history, in this context appears to mean a definitive and finalized framework of events and actions—comfortingly familiar shared facts—like an omniscient medieval chronicle, shorn of alternative accounts, psychological interpretations, or literary pretensions. But prominent scholars have expressed diametrically opposing views:

[T]he stories about the promise given to the patriarchs in Genesis are not historical, nor do they intend to be historical; they are rather historically determined expressions about Israel and Israel's relationship to its God, given in forms legitimate to their time, and their truth lies not in their facticity, nor in the historicity, but their ability to express the reality that Israel experienced.

Modern professional historians, familiar with the phenomenon of on-going historical revisionism, allow new findings and ideas into their interpretations of "what happened", and scholars versed in the study of texts (however sacred) see all narrators as potentially unreliable and all accounts—especially edited accounts—as potentially historically incomplete, biased by times and circumstances.

== Hebrew Bible/Old Testament ==
=== Authorship ===
As early as the Middle Ages, scholars such as Abraham ibn Ezra noted internal contradictions that suggested the Pentateuch was not authored by Moses. For example, Moses could not have written an account of his own death in Deuteronomy 34.

These ideas became more common during the Protestant Reformation. The English philosopher Thomas Hobbes in his major work Leviathan (1651) argued that the biblical texts themselves provide significant evidence for when they were written. Readers, he notes, should be guided by what the text itself says rather than relying on later tradition: "The light therefore that must guide us in this question, must be that which is held out unto us from the books themselves: and this light, though it shew us not the author of every book, yet it is not unuseful to give us knowledge of the time wherein they were written." Using such textual clues, Hobbes found it was impossible for Moses to have authored the Pentateuch. He also believed Joshua, Judges, Samuel, Kings, and Chronicles were written long after the events they describe.

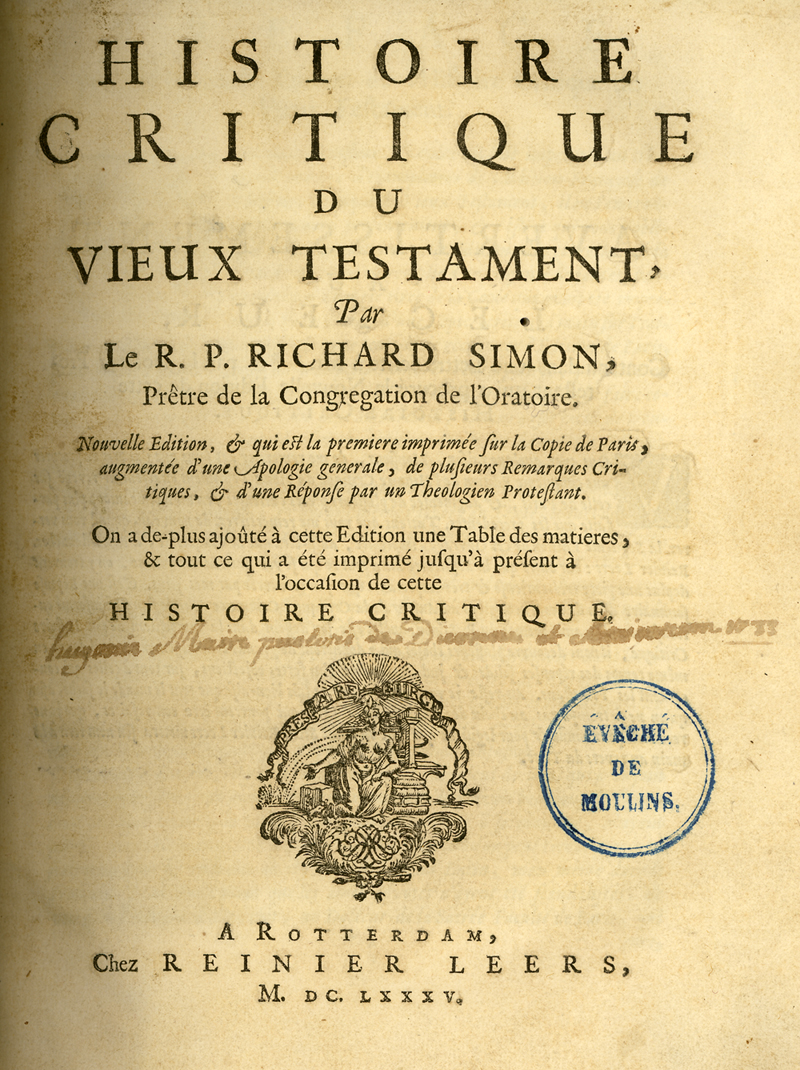
Title page of Simon's Critical History, 1682.

The Jewish philosopher and pantheist Baruch Spinoza echoed Hobbes's doubts about the provenance of the historical books in his Tractatus Theologico-Politicus (published in 1670), and elaborated on the suggestion that the final redaction of these texts was post-exilic under the auspices of Ezra (Chapter IX). He had earlier been effectively excommunicated by the rabbinical council of Amsterdam for his perceived heresies. The French priest Richard Simon brought these critical perspectives to the Catholic tradition in 1678, observing "the most part of the Holy Scriptures that are come to us, are but Abridgments and as Summaries of ancient Acts which were kept in the Registries of the Hebrews," in what was probably the first work of biblical textual criticism in the modern sense.

In response Jean Astruc, applying to the Pentateuch source criticism methods common in the analysis of classical secular texts, believed he could detect four different manuscript traditions, which he claimed Moses himself had redacted (p. 62–64). His 1753 book initiated the school known as higher criticism that culminated in Julius Wellhausen formalising the documentary hypothesis in the 1870s, which identifies these narratives as the Jahwist, Elohist, Deuteronomist, and the Priestly source. While versions of the documentary hypothesis vary in the order in which they were composed, the circumstances of their composition, and the date of their redaction(s), their shared terminology continues to provide the framework for modern theories on the composite nature and origins of the Torah.

=== Torah (Pentateuch) ===
==== Genesis creation narrative ====
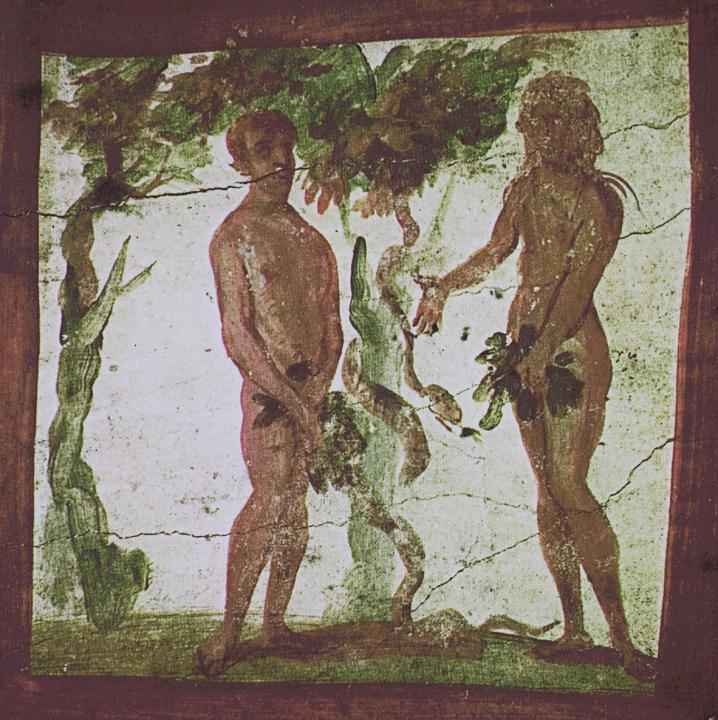
A depiction of Adam and Eve in the Garden of Eden; first half of the fourth century AD.

There is a Christian tradition of criticism of the creation narratives in Genesis dating back to at least St Augustine of Hippo (354–430), and Jewish tradition has also maintained a critical thread in its approach to biblical primeval history. The influential medieval philosopher Maimonides maintained a skeptical ambiguity toward creation ex nihilo and considered the stories about Adam more as "philosophical anthropology, rather than as historical stories whose protagonist is the 'first man'." Greek philosophers Aristotle, Critolaus and Proclus held that the world was eternal. Such interpretations are inconsistent with what was after the Protestant Reformation to be "commonly perceived in evangelicalism as traditional views of Genesis".

The publication of James Hutton's Theory of the Earth in 1788 was an important development in the scientific revolution that would dethrone Genesis as the ultimate authority on primeval earth and prehistory. The first casualty was the Creation story itself, and by the early 19th century "no responsible scientist contended for the literal credibility of the Mosaic account of creation." The battle between uniformitarianism and catastrophism kept the flood alive in the emerging discipline, until Adam Sedgwick, the president of the Geological Society, publicly recanted his previous support in his 1831 presidential address:

We ought indeed to have paused before we first adopted the diluvian theory, and referred all our old superficial gravel to the action of the Mosaic Flood. For of man, and the works of his hands, we have not yet found a single trace among the remnants of the former world entombed in those deposits.

All of which left the "first man" and his putative descendants in the awkward position of being stripped of all historical context, until Charles Darwin naturalized the Garden of Eden with the publication of On the Origin of Species in 1859. Public acceptance of this scientific revolution was, at the time, uneven, but has since grown significantly. The mainstream scholarly community soon arrived at a consensus, which holds today, that Genesis 1–11 is a highly schematic literary work representing theology/symbolic mythology rather than actual history or science.

==== The Patriarchs ====
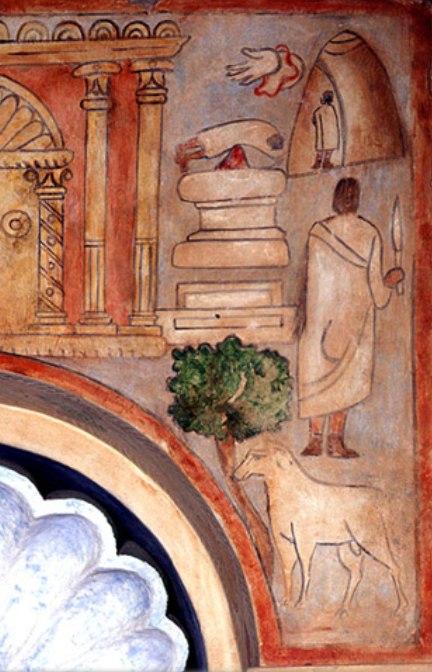
The Sacrifice of Isaac; 245 AD.

In the following decades Hermann Gunkel drew attention to the mythic aspects of the Pentateuch, and Albrecht Alt, Martin Noth and the tradition history school argued that although its core traditions had genuinely ancient roots, the narratives were fictional framing devices and were not intended as history in the modern sense. Though doubts have been cast on the historiographic reconstructions of this school (particularly the notion of oral traditions as a primary ancient source), much of its critique of biblical historicity found wide acceptance. Gunkel's position is that

if, however, we consider figures like Abraham, Isaac, and Jacob to be actual persons with no original mythic foundations, that does not at all mean that they are historical figures. ... For even if, as may well be assumed, there was once a man call "Abraham," everyone who knows the history of legends is sure that the legend is in no position at the distance of so many centuries to preserve a picture of the personal piety of Abraham. The "religion of Abraham" is, in reality, the religion of the legend narrators which they attribute to Abraham.

— Gunkel, 1997, page xviii

This has in various forms become a commonplace of contemporary criticism.

In the United States the biblical archaeology movement, under the influence of Albright, counterattacked, arguing that the broad outline within the framing narratives was also true, so that while scholars could not realistically expect to prove or disprove individual episodes from the life of Abraham and the other patriarchs, these were real individuals who could be placed in a context proven from the archaeological record. But as more discoveries were made, and anticipated finds failed to materialise, it became apparent that archaeology did not in fact support the claims made by Albright and his followers.

Following Albright's death, his interpretation of the patriarchal age came under increasing criticism: such dissatisfaction culminated with the publication of The Historicity of the Patriarchal Narratives by Thomas L. Thompson in 1974 and Abraham in History and Tradition by John Van Seters in 1975. Thompson, a literary scholar, argued on the lack of compelling evidence that the patriarchs lived in the 2nd millennium BCE, and noted how certain biblical texts reflected first millennium conditions and concerns, while Van Seters examined the patriarchal stories and argued that their names, social milieu, and messages strongly suggested that they were Iron Age creations. Van Seter and Thompson's works were a paradigm shift in biblical scholarship and archaeology, which gradually led scholars to no longer consider the patriarchal narratives as historical. Some conservative scholars attempted to defend the patriarchal narratives in the following years, but this position has not found acceptance among scholars.

Nevertheless, some biblical scholars argue that the names of Patriarchs correspond to Amorite personal names typical of the Middle Bronze Age (2000–1550 BCE) rather than to other names from later periods, which suggests that the Patriarchal narratives were based on traditions originating in the second millennium BCE. Other scholars argue that the narratives fit better the historical reality of the late Judahite monarchy. The narratives refer to camel-based traders carrying gum, balm, and myrrh, which they hold it is unlikely prior to the first millennium, as such activity only became common in the 8th–7th centuries BCE when Assyrian hegemony enabled this Arabian trade to flourish into a major industry. In 2013, excavations in the Timna Valley discovered what may be the earliest bones of domesticated camels found in Israel or even outside the Arabian peninsula, dating to around 930 BCE. This is seen as evidence that the stories of Abraham, Joseph, Jacob and Esau were written after this time. In 2021, Martin Heide and Joris Peters argued that camels were already domesticated in the early second millennium BCE and that their presence in the Patriarchal narratives was not anachronistic.

Critical scholars such as David Ilan have noted that personal names found in the patriarchal narratives also appear in third-millennium BCE sources, such as the Ebla archive, which mentions names like Abram, Esau, Ishmael, Israel, Michael, and others. In addition, traders and migrants traveled from Mesopotamia to Canaan in antiquity. On this basis, Ilan argues that the patriarchal narratives may fit not only a single historical period but several periods throughout history. He also points out that the narratives contain a number of anachronisms, including references to camels, Philistines, and certain place names.

Today, although there continues to be some debate on the historical background of the narratives, many scholars (possibly most) reject the existence of the Patriarchal age. William Dever stated in 1993 that

[Albright's] central theses have all been overturned, partly by further advances in biblical criticism, but mostly by the continuing archaeological research of younger Americans and Israelis to whom he himself gave encouragement and momentum. ... The irony is that, in the long run, it will have been the newer "secular" archaeology that contributed the most to Biblical studies, not "Biblical archaeology".

— William Dever, The Biblical Archaeologist, "What Remains of the House that Albright Built?", March 1993, pp. 25–35

=== The Exodus ===
Most mainstream scholars do not accept the biblical Exodus account as historically accurate for a number of reasons. It is generally agreed that the Exodus stories reached the current form centuries after the apparent setting of the stories. The Book of Exodus itself attempts to ground the event firmly in history, stating that the Israelites dwelled in Egypt for 430 years (Exodus 12:40–41), and including place names such as Goshen (Gen. 46:28), Pithom and Ramesses (Exod. 1:11), as well as stating that 600,000 Israelite men were involved (Exodus 12:37). The Book of Numbers further states that the number of Israelites in the desert during the wandering were 603,550, including 22,273 first-borns, which modern estimates put at 2.5–3 million total Israelites, a clearly fanciful number that could never have been supported by the Sinai Desert. The geography is vague with regions such as Goshen unidentified, and there are internal problems with dating in the Pentateuch. No modern attempt to identify a historical Egyptian prototype for Moses has found wide acceptance, and no period in Egyptian history matches the biblical accounts of the Exodus. Some elements of the story are miraculous and defy natural explanation, such as the Plagues of Egypt and the Crossing of the Red Sea. The Bible also does not mention the names of any of the pharaohs involved in the Exodus narrative.

While ancient Egyptian texts from the New Kingdom mention "Asiatics" living in Egypt as slaves and workers, these people cannot be securely connected to the Israelites, and no contemporary Egyptian text mentions a large-scale exodus of slaves like that described in the Bible. The earliest surviving historical mention of the Israelites, the Egyptian Merneptah Stele (c. 1207 BCE), appears to place them in or around Canaan and gives no indication of any exodus. Archaeological evidence shows that around this time period, there was a population expansion in the central highlands of the land of Israel, with the material culture reflecting a local, rural development of Canaanite culture. Ronald Hendel connects the formation of these highland communities and unifying shared identity with the exodus tradition.

Despite the lack of a secure historical grounding, a majority of scholars agree that the Exodus has historical basis, with Kenton Sparks referring to it as "mythologized history." Scholars posit that small groups of people of Egyptian origin may have joined the early Israelites, and then contributed their own Egyptian Exodus story to all of Israel. William G. Dever cautiously identifies this group with the Tribe of Joseph, while Richard Elliott Friedman identifies it with the Tribe of Levi. Most scholars who accept a historical core of the exodus date this possible exodus group to the thirteenth century BCE at the time of Ramses II, with some instead dating it to the twelfth century BCE at the time of Ramses III. Evidence in favor of historical traditions forming a background to the Exodus narrative include the documented movements of small groups of Ancient Semitic-speaking peoples into and out of Egypt during the Eighteenth and Nineteenth Dynasties, some elements of Egyptian folklore and culture in the Exodus narrative, and the names Moses, Aaron and Phinehas, which seem to have an Egyptian origin.

Scholarly estimates for how many people could have been involved in such an exodus range from a few hundred to a few thousand people.

Donald Redford held that the Exodus narrative is a Canaanite memory of the Hyksos' descent and occupation of Egypt. Building on a different perspective, Gili Kugler has shown that several biblical texts preserve a tradition of Israel’s residence in Egypt without slavery. For example, Ezekiel 20 recalls God’s revelation in Egypt but omits any mention of slavery or oppression, while Deuteronomy 23:7–8 refers to the Israelites as resident aliens rather than slaves. Kugler concludes that the motif of slavery and redemption was gradually added to the Exodus story in later periods, reflecting evolving socio-political and theological concerns.

=== Deuteronomistic history ===
Many scholars believe that the Deuteronomistic history preserved elements of ancient texts and oral tradition, including geo-political and socio-economic realities and certain information about historical figures and events. However, large portions of it are legendary and it contains many anachronisms.

A significant number of biblical individuals have been identified independently via numerous Northwest Semitic inscriptions and other archeological sources from the 1200 - 539 BC time period. Lawrence J. Mykytiuk provided corrections and updates due to recent discoveries and forgeries of some inscriptions.

==== The "conquest narrative" in Joshua and Judges ====
A major issue in the historicity debate was the narrative of the Israelite conquest of Canaan, described in Joshua and Judges. The American Albright school asserted that the biblical narrative of conquest would be affirmed by archaeological record; and indeed for much of the 20th century archaeology appeared to support the biblical narrative, including excavations at Beitin (identified as Bethel), Tel ed-Duweir, (identified as Lachish), Hazor, and Jericho.

However, flaws in the conquest narrative appeared. The most high-profile example was the "fall of Jericho", excavated by John Garstang in the 1930s. Garstang originally announced that he had found fallen walls dating to the time of the biblical Battle of Jericho, but later revised the destruction to a much earlier period. Kathleen Kenyon dated the destruction of the walled city to the middle of the 16th century (c. 1550 BCE), too early to match the usual dating of the Exodus to Pharaoh Ramses, on the basis of her excavations in the early 1950s. The same conclusion, based on an analysis of all the excavation findings, was reached by Piotr Bienkowski. By the 1960s it had become clear that the archaeological record did not, in fact, support the account of the conquest given in Joshua: the cities which the Bible records as having been destroyed by the Israelites were either uninhabited at the time, or, if destroyed, were destroyed at widely different times, not in one brief period. The consensus for the conquest narrative was eventually abandoned in the late 20th century. As of 2023 "No mainstream biblicist or archaeologist any longer espouses the conquest model."

More recent excavations led by Lorenzo Nigro have found that Jericho was occupied in the Late Bronze Age (1400–1200 BCE). During this period, the previous Middle Bronze city wall was refurbished by adding a mudbrick wall on top of its emerging crest. The city also had a structure known as the "Middle Building" which apparently served as the residence of its local rulers, then vassals of the Egyptian empire. There also appears to be evidence that the Middle Building was eventually destroyed, only being reused later in the early Iron Age.

Peake's Commentary on the Bible argues that the Book of Joshua conflates several independent battles between disparate groups over the centuries, and artificially attributes them to a single leader, Joshua. However, there are a few cases where the biblical record is not contradicted by the archaeological record. For example, stratum XIII in Tel Hazor, found in a destruction layer from around 1200 BCE, shows signs of catastrophic fire, and cuneiform tablets found at the site refer to monarchs named Ibni Addi, where Ibni may be the etymological origin of Yavin (Jabin), the Canaanite leader referred to in the Hebrew Bible. The city also shows signs of having been a magnificent Canaanite city prior to its destruction, with great temples and opulent palaces, split into an upper acropolis and lower city; the town evidently had been a major Canaanite city. Israel Finkelstein theorized that the destruction of Hazor was the result of civil strife, attacks by the Sea Peoples or a result of the general collapse of civilization across the whole eastern Mediterranean in the Late Bronze Age, rather than being caused by the Israelites.

Amnon Ben-Tor (Hebrew University of Jerusalem) believes that recently unearthed evidence of violent destruction by burning verifies the biblical account. In 2012, a team led by Ben-Tor and Sharon Zuckerman discovered a scorched palace from the 13th century BC in whose storerooms they found 3,400-year-old ewers holding burned crops; however, Sharon Zuckerman did not agree with Ben-Tor's theory, and claimed that the burning was the result of the city's numerous factions opposing each other with excessive force. Biblical scholar Richard Elliot Friedman (University of Georgia) argues that the Israelites did destroy Hazor, but that such destruction fits better with the account of the Book of Judges, in which the prophetess Deborah defeats the king of Hazor.

==== Books of Samuel ====
The Books of Samuel are considered to be based on both historical and legendary sources, primarily serving to fill the gap in Israelite history after the events described in Deuteronomy.

According to Donald Redford, the Books of Samuel exhibit too many anachronisms to have been compiled in the 11th century BCE. For example, there is mention of later armor (1 Samuel 17:4–7, 38–39; 25:13), use of camels (1 Samuel 30:17), and cavalry (as distinct from chariotry; 1 Samuel 13:5, 2 Samuel 1:6), iron picks and axes (as though they were common; 2 Samuel 12:31), and sophisticated siege techniques (2 Samuel 20:15). There is a gargantuan troop called up (2 Samuel 17:1), a battle with 20,000 casualties (2 Samuel 18:7), and a reference to Kushite paramilitary and servants, clearly giving evidence of a date in which Kushites were common, after the 26th Dynasty of Egypt, the period of the last quarter of the 8th century BCE. Alan Millard argues that those elements of the Biblical narrative are not anachronistic.

==== United Monarchy ====
Much of the focus of modern criticism has been the historicity of the United Monarchy of Israel, which according to the Hebrew Bible ruled over both Judea and Samaria around the 10th century BCE.

In Iron Age IIa (corresponding to the Early Monarchichal period) Judah seems to have had a number of fortified cities, with evidence for literacy and city planning supporting the existence of a centralized organization. This correlates to the upper Samaria which was also becoming urbanized. In the 1990s, interpretations of archaeological evidence as well as textual criticism had led many modern historians to treat Israel as arising separately from Judah and as distinct albeit related entities centered at Shechem and Jerusalem, respectively, and not as a united kingdom with a capital in Jerusalem.

Excavations at Khirbet Qeiyafa, an Iron Age site located in Judah, support the biblical account of a United Monarchy. The Israel Antiquities Authority stated: "The excavations at Khirbat Qeiyafa clearly reveal an urban society that existed in Judah already in the late eleventh century BCE. It can no longer be argued that the Kingdom of Judah developed only in the late eighth century BCE or at some other later date."

The status of Jerusalem in the 10th century BCE is a major subject of debate. The oldest part of Jerusalem and its original urban core is the City of David, which does show evidence of significant Judean residential activity around the 10th century. Some unique administrative structures such as the Stepped Stone Structure and the Large Stone Structure, which originally formed one structure, contain material culture dated to Iron I. On account of an alleged lack of settlement activity in the 10th century BCE, Israel Finkelstein argues that Jerusalem in the century was a small country village in the Judean hills, not a national capital, and Ussishkin argues that the city was entirely uninhabited. Amihai Mazar contends that if the Iron I/Iron IIa dating of administrative structures in the City of David are correct (as he believes), "Jerusalem was a rather small town with a mighty citadel, which could have been a center of a substantial regional polity." Avraham Faust and Zev Farber argue that Jerusalem was significantly large when compared with most highland sites in ancient Israel, and contained fortifications and public buildings.

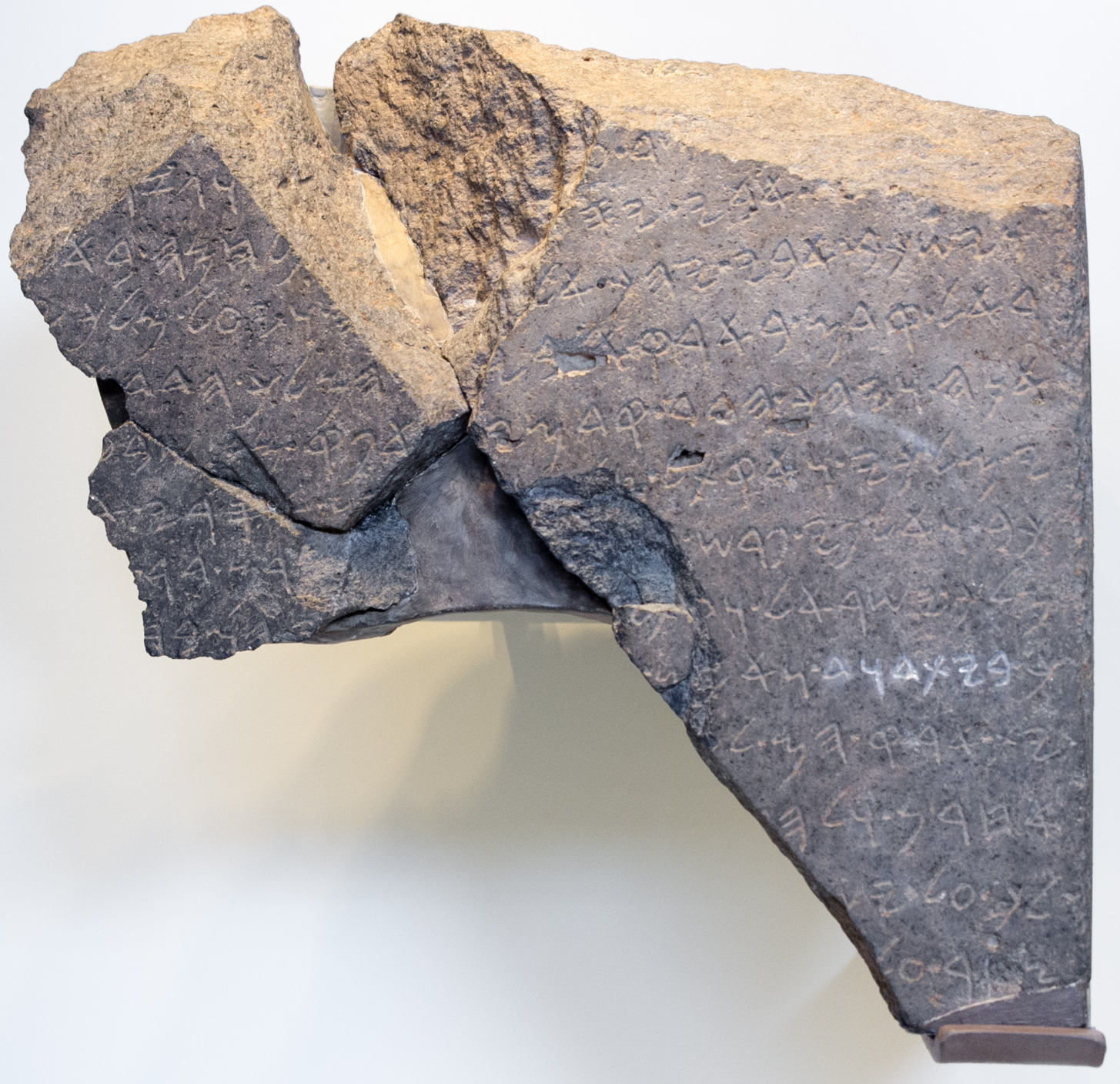
The Tel Dan Stele (dated to c. 9th century BCE) which contains a reference to the House of David.

It has been argued that recent archaeological discoveries at the City of David and the Ophel seem to indicate that Jerusalem was sufficiently developed as a city to be the capital of the United Monarchy in the 10th century BCE.

Since the discovery of the Tel Dan Stele in July 1993 and dated to the 9th or 8th century BCE containing bytdwd, interpreted by many as a reference to the "House of David" as a monarchic dynasty in Judah (another possible reference occurs in the Mesha Stele), the majority of scholars accept the existence of a polity ruled by David and Solomon, albeit on a more modest scale than described in the Bible. Most scholars believe that David and Solomon reigned over large sections of Cisjordan and probably parts of Transjordan. William G. Dever argues that David only reigned over the current territories of Israel and West Bank and that he did defeat the invading Philistines, but that the other conquests are fictitious.

== New Testament ==
=== Historicity of Jesus ===
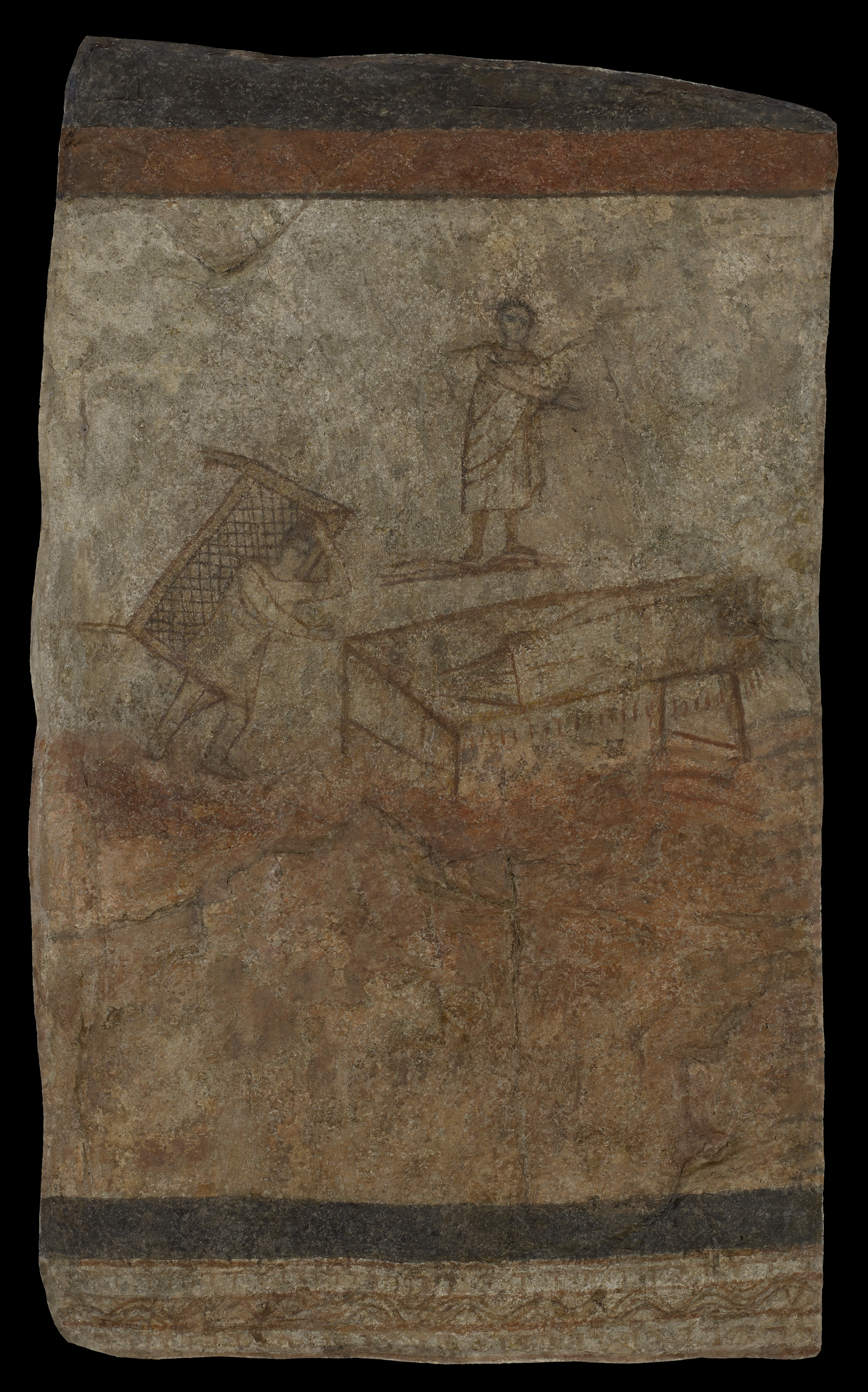
3rd Century AD depiction of Jesus from the Church at Dura-Europos, one of the earliest ones.

Virtually all modern scholars of antiquity agree that Jesus existed historically, (Note: In a 2011 review of the state of modern scholarship, Bart Ehrman wrote, "He certainly existed, as virtually every competent scholar of antiquity, Christian or non-Christian, agrees". Richard A. Burridge states: "There are those who argue that Jesus is a figment of the Church's imagination, that there never was a Jesus at all. I have to say that I do not know any respectable critical scholar who says that any more". Robert M. Price does not believe that Jesus existed, but agrees that this perspective runs against the views of the majority of scholars. James D. G. Dunn calls the theories of Jesus' non-existence "a thoroughly dead thesis". Michael Grant (a classicist) wrote in 1977, "In recent years, 'no serious scholar has ventured to postulate the non historicity of Jesus' or at any rate very few, and they have not succeeded in disposing of the much stronger, indeed very abundant, evidence to the contrary". Robert E. Van Voorst states that biblical scholars and classical historians regard theories of non-existence of Jesus as effectively refuted. Writing on The Daily Beast, Candida Moss and Joel Baden state that "there is nigh universal consensus among biblical scholars - the authentic ones, at least - that Jesus was, in fact, a real guy") that he was baptized by John the Baptist, and was crucified by order of Roman prefect Pontius Pilate. The "quest for the historical Jesus" began as early as the 18th century, and has continued to this day. The most notable recent scholarship came in the 1980s and 1990s, with the work of J. D. Crossan, James D. G. Dunn, John P. Meier, E. P. Sanders and N. T. Wright being the most widely read and discussed. Other works on the matter were published by Dale Allison, Bart D. Ehrman, Richard Bauckham and Maurice Casey.

There are at least 14 independent sources from multiple authors within a century of the crucifixion of Jesus that survive. Other independent sources did not survive, but are noted in the surviving sources. The letters of Paul are the earliest surviving sources referencing Jesus, and Paul documents personally knowing and interacting with eyewitnesses such as Jesus' brother James and some of Jesus' closest disciples around 36 CE, within a few years of the crucifixion (30 or 33 CE). Paul was a contemporary of Jesus and throughout his letters, a fairly full outline of the life of Jesus can be found including details such as being "born of a woman," descending from regular people such as Abraham and David, being a Jew and being brought up in Jewish Law, gathering together disciples, having family, the Last Supper, being betrayed, being crucified, people being involved in his crucifixion, etc. Besides the gospels, and the letters of Paul, non-biblical works that are considered sources for the historicity of Jesus include two mentions in Antiquities of the Jews (Testimonium Flavianum, Jesus' own brother James) by Jewish historian and Galilean military leader Josephus (dated circa 93–94 CE) and a mention in Annals by Roman historian Tacitus (circa 116 CE). From just Paul, Josephus, and Tacitus alone, the existence of Jesus along with the general time and place of his activity can be adduced. Additionally, multiple independent sources affirm that Jesus actually had siblings. Contemporary non-Christian sources in the first and second centuries never deny the existence of Jesus including Pagan or Jewish writers who opposed Christianity.

The discovery of the Dead Sea Scrolls has shed light into the context of 1st century Judea, noting the diversity of Jewish belief as well as shared expectations and teachings. For example, the expectation of the coming messiah, the beatitudes of the Sermon on the Mount and much else of the early Christian movement are found to have existed within apocalyptic Judaism of the period. This has had the effect of centering Early Christianity much more within its Jewish roots than was previously the case. It is now recognised that Rabbinic Judaism and Early Christianity are only two of the many strands which survived until the Jewish revolt of 66 to 70 CE.

Most historical critics agree that a historical figure named Jesus taught in the Galilean countryside c. 30 CE, was believed by his followers to have performed supernatural acts, and was sentenced to death by the Romans, possibly for insurrection.

==== Miracles of Jesus ====
Scholars are divided on the matter of miracles with no consensus on their historicity; some ruling them out a priori, others defending the possibility of miracles, and others defending them outright. New Testament scholar Bart Ehrman argues that though some historians believe that miracles have happened and others do not, due to the limitations of the sources, it is not possible for historians to affirm or deny them. He states "This is not a problem for only one kind of historian—for atheists or agnostics or Buddhists or Roman Catholics or Baptists or Jews or Muslims; it is a problem for all historians of every stripe." According to Mike Licona, among general historians there are some postmodern views of historiography that are open to the investigation of miracles.

==== Burial ====
In the gospel accounts, the resurrection tradition appears in Mark 16, Matthew 28, Luke 24, and John 20 to 21 where the risen Jesus appears to different people after his tomb was found empty by women. A topic of debate among scholars is whether Jesus was ever buried in a tomb, and if such a tomb was indeed found empty. An argument in favor of a decent burial before sunset is the Jewish custom, based on the Torah, that the body of an executed person should not remain on the tree where the corpse was hung for public display, but be buried before sunrise. This is based on Deuteronomy 21:22–23, but also attested in the Temple Scroll of the Essenes, and in Josephus' Jewish War 4.5.2§317, describing the burial of crucified Jewish insurgents before sunset.

Scholars such as Bart Ehrman and John Dominic Crossan doubt that Jesus had a decent burial, or that the disciples even knew what had happened to his body. Ehrman argues that crucifixion was meant "to torture and humiliate a person as fully as possible", and the body was normally left on the stake to be eaten by animals. Ehrman further argues that criminals were usually buried in common graves, and Pilate had no concern for Jewish sensitivities, which makes it unlikely that he would have allowed for Jesus to be buried.

In contrast, James Dunn argues that the burial tradition is "one of the oldest pieces of tradition we have", referring to 1 Cor. 15.4; burial was in line with Jewish custom as prescribed by Deut. 21.22-23 and confirmed by Josephus War; cases of burial of crucified persons are known, as attested by the Jehohanan burial; Joseph of Arimathea "is a very plausible historical character"; and "the presence of the women at the cross and their involvement in Jesus' burial can be attributed more plausibly to early oral memory than to creative story-telling". Similarly, Dale Allison, reviewing the arguments of Crossan and Ehrman, considers their assertions strong but "find[s] it likely that a man named Joseph, probably a Sanhedrist, from the obscure Arimathea, sought and obtained permission from the Roman authorities to make arrangements for Jesus’ hurried burial."

According to religion professor John Granger Cook, there are historical texts that mention mass graves, but they contain no indication of those bodies being dug up by animals. There is no mention of an open pit or shallow graves in any Roman text. There are a number of historical texts outside the gospels showing the bodies of the crucified dead were buried by family or friends. Cook writes that "those texts show that the narrative of Joseph of Arimethaea's burial of Jesus would be perfectly comprehensible to a Greco-Roman reader of the gospels and historically credible."

==== Empty tomb and resurrection appearances ====
Scholars have tackled the question of establishing what contents of the resurrection tradition are historically probable. For example, it is widely accepted among New Testament scholars that Jesus' followers soon came to believe they had seen him resurrected shortly after his death. Robert Funk writes that "the disciples thought that they had witnessed Jesus’ appearances, which, however they are explained, “is a fact upon which both believer and unbeliever may agree."

Most scholars agree John knew and used the Synoptic Gospels. Recent scholarship has turned away from source criticism of the gospels or positing hypothetical sources for John. Other scholars have argued that the Apostle Paul is aware of an empty tomb in his earlier creed in 1 Cor. 15 and thereby corroborating the gospel accounts.

Scholars have identified legendary or unoriginal details within the resurrection tradition. For example, the story of the guards at the tomb in Matthew 27 is "widely regarded as an apologetic legend" meant to refute Jewish critics. Quoting a published dissertation on the empty tomb tradition in Mark, Mike Licona writes that “not a few, but rather a majority, of contemporary scholars believe that there is some historical kernel in the empty tomb tradition."

According to Geza Vermes, "had the accounts been the products of wholesale manufacturing, it is highly unlikely that they would have provided female witnesses who “had no standing in a male-dominated Jewish society.” Moreover, they would have gotten the number of women in the various narratives correct. In short, had the narratives been the result of complete invention, they would have been more uniform and they would have included credible witnesses. In contrast, Bart D. Ehrman rejects the story of the empty tomb, and argues that "an empty tomb had nothing to do with [belief in the resurrection] [...] an empty tomb would not produce faith". Ehrman argues that the empty tomb was needed to underscore the physical resurrection of Jesus.

As with miracles, there is no single approach by scholars to the question of the resurrection of Jesus and if it really happened or not. "Historical Jesus" scholars in general tend to avoid the topic since many believe the matter to be about faith, or lack thereof. Nevertheless, scholars have sought to make their own cases for and against the historicity of the resurrection. Skeptical scholars generally argue that the resurrection appearances were caused by hallucinations. For example, Gerd Lüdemann argues that Peter had a vision of Jesus, induced by his feelings of guilt for betraying Jesus. The vision elevated this feeling of guilt, and Peter experienced it as a real appearance of Jesus, raised from dead. However, scholars such as N.T. Wright and Dale Allison, among others, argue that hallucinations would not lead or correspond to a belief in resurrection. In contrast to the skeptical view, Christian biblical scholars typically argue for a historical, physical resurrection of Jesus based on biblical evidence. For example, scholars such as Mike Licona argue that the diversity of different witnesses, such as skeptics Paul and James, are of important value to historians and, writing further, that attempts to downplay such value don't work. According to Wright, there is substantial unanimity among the early Christian writers (first and second century) that Jesus had been bodily raised from the dead.

=== Historicity of the Gospels ===
Most modern scholars hold that the canonical gospel accounts were written between 70 and 100, four to eight decades after the crucifixion. Modern scholarship tends to emphasize the evangelists' authorial activity over positing hypothetical sources. Some scholars argue that these accounts were compiled by witnesses although this view is disputed by other scholars.

Some scholars believe that the Gospel of Mark shows signs of a lack of knowledge of geographical, political and religious matters in Judea in the time of Jesus. Scholarship is inconclusive on authorship, with some denying that the gospel was written by anyone named Mark while others accept the view John Mark was the author. Others argue the gospel was written by a Mark not mentioned in the Bible or connected to Peter.; opinion varies, and scholars such as Craig Blomberg accept the more traditional view. J. A. Lloyd argues that recent archaeological research in the Galilee region shows that Jesus' itinerary as depicted by Mark is historically and geographically plausible. The use of expressions that may be described as awkward and rustic cause the Gospel of Mark to appear somewhat unlettered or even crude. This may be attributed to the influence that Saint Peter, a fisherman, is suggested to have on the writing of Mark. The Gospel of Matthew and the Gospel of Luke used Mark more conservatively than other ancient historians, though the variations among the Synoptic gospels are typical of ancient historical biographies.

Numerous religious and political figures in the New Testament have archaeological record or extra-biblical attestation.

=== Historicity of Acts ===
Archaeological inscriptions and other independent sources show that Acts contains some accurate details of 1st century society with regard to titles of officials, administrative divisions, town assemblies, and rules of the Jewish temple in Jerusalem. However, the historicity of the depiction of Paul the Apostle in Acts is contested. Recent scholarship has challenged the idea that the Paul of Acts and the letters share little resemblance. Acts describes Paul differently from how Paul describes himself, both factually and theologically. Acts differs from Paul's letters on important issues, such as the Law, Paul's own apostleship, and his relation to the Jerusalem church. Scholars generally prefer Paul's account over that in Acts, though Roman historians have generally taken the basic historicity of Acts as granted.

== Schools of archaeological and historical thought ==
=== Overview of academic views ===
According to Spencer Mizen of BBC History Magazine, "The origins of the Bible are still cloaked in mystery. When was it written? Who wrote it? And how reliable is it as an historical record?"

An educated reading of the biblical text requires knowledge of when it was written, by whom, and for what purpose. For example, many academics would agree that the Pentateuch was in existence some time shortly after the 6th century BCE, but they disagree about when it was written. Proposed dates vary from the 15th century BCE to the 6th century BCE. One popular hypothesis points to the reign of Josiah (7th century BCE). In this hypothesis, the events of, for example, Exodus would have happened centuries before they were finally edited.

The documentary hypothesis claims, using the biblical evidence itself, to demonstrate that the current version of the Bible is based on older written sources that are lost. It has been modified heavily over the years, and some scholars accept some form of this hypothesis. There have also been and are a number of scholars who reject it, for example Egyptologist Kenneth Kitchen and Old Testament scholar Walter Kaiser, Jr., as well as R. N. Whybray, Umberto Cassuto, O. T. Allis, Gleason Archer, John Sailhamer, Bruce Waltke, and Joshua Berman.

=== Maximalist–minimalist dichotomy ===
There is great scholarly controversy on the historicity of events recounted in the biblical narratives prior to the Babylonian captivity in the 6th century BCE. There is a split between scholars who reject the biblical account of Ancient Israel as fundamentally ahistorical, and those who accept it as a largely reliable source of history—termed biblical minimalists and biblical maximalists, respectively. The major split of biblical scholarship into two opposing schools is strongly disapproved by non-fundamentalist biblical scholars, as being an attempt by conservative Christians to portray the field as a bipolar argument, of which only one side is correct. The Quest for the Historical Israel by Israel Finkelstein et al attempted to be more balanced.

=== Biblical minimalism ===
The viewpoint sometimes called biblical minimalism generally holds that the Bible is principally a theological and apologetic work. The early stories are held to have a historical basis that was reconstructed centuries later, which are supported by archaeological discoveries. In this view, the stories about the biblical patriarchs are believed to be fictional. Furthermore, biblical minimalists hold that the twelve tribes of Israel were a later construction, the stories of King David and King Saul were modeled upon later Irano-Hellenistic examples, believing that the united Kingdom of Israel—where the Bible says that David and Solomon ruled over an empire from the Euphrates to Eilath—never existed.

It is hard to pinpoint when the movement started but 1968 seems to be a reasonable date. During this year, two prize-winning essays were written in Copenhagen; one by Niels Peter Lemche, the other by Heike Friis, which advocated a complete rethinking of the way we approach the Bible and attempt to draw historical conclusions from it.

In published books, one of the early advocates of the current school of thought known as biblical minimalism is Giovanni Garbini, Storia e ideologia nell'Israele antico (1986), translated into English as History and Ideology in Ancient Israel (1988). In his footsteps followed Thomas L. Thompson with his lengthy Early History of the Israelite People: From the Written & Archaeological Sources (1992) and, building explicitly on Thompson's book, P. R. Davies' shorter work, In Search of 'Ancient Israel' (1992). In the latter, Davies finds historical Israel only in archaeological remains, biblical Israel only in scripture, and recent reconstructions of "ancient Israel" to be an unacceptable amalgam of the two. Thompson and Davies see the entire Hebrew Bible (Old Testament) as the imaginative creation of a small community of Jews at Jerusalem during the period which the Bible assigns to after the return from the Babylonian exile, from 539 BCE onward. Niels Peter Lemche, Thompson's fellow faculty member at the University of Copenhagen, also followed with several titles that show Thompson's influence, including The Israelites in history and tradition (1998). The presence of both Thompson and Lemche at the same institution has led to the use of the term "Copenhagen school". The effect of biblical minimalism from 1992 onward was debate with more than two points of view.

=== Biblical maximalism ===
There is great scholarly controversy on the historicity particularly of those events recounted in the biblical narratives prior to the Babylonian captivity in the 6th century BCE. Regarding the debate over the historicity of ancient Israel, the maximalist position holds that the accounts of the United Monarchy and the early kings of Israel, David and Saul, are to be taken as largely historical.

=== Decreasing conflict ===
In 2001, Israel Finkelstein and Neil Asher Silberman published The Bible Unearthed: Archaeology's New Vision of Ancient Israel and the Origin of Its Sacred Texts which advocated a view midway toward biblical minimalism and caused an uproar among many conservatives. In the 25th anniversary issue of Biblical Archaeology Review (March/April 2001 edition), editor Hershel Shanks quoted several biblical scholars who insisted that minimalism was dying, although leading minimalists deny this and a claim has been made "We are all minimalists now" (an allusion to "We are all Keynesians now").

Apart from the well-funded (and fundamentalist) "biblical archaeologists," we are in fact nearly all "minimalists" now.

— Philip Davies.

The fact is that we are all minimalists—at least, when it comes to the patriarchal period and the settlement. When I began my PhD studies more than three decades ago in the USA, the "substantial historicity" of the patriarchs was widely accepted as was the unified conquest of the land. These days it is quite difficult to find anyone who takes this view. In fact, until recently I could find no 'maximalist' history of Israel since Wellhausen. ...In fact, though, "maximalist" has been widely defined as someone who accepts the biblical text unless it can be proven wrong. If so, very few are willing to operate like this, not even John Bright (1980) whose history is not a maximalist one according to the definition just given.

— Lester L. Grabbe., pages 57–58

However, other more mainstream scholars have rejected these claims:

The skeptical approaches peaked in the 1990s, with the emergence of the minimalist school which attempted to deny the Bible any relevance for the study of the Iron Age, but this extreme approach was rejected by mainstream scholarship.

— Avraham Faust., page 79

In 2003, Kenneth Kitchen, a scholar who adopts a more maximalist point of view, authored the book On the Reliability of the Old Testament. Kitchen advocated the reliability of many (although not all) parts of the Torah and in no uncertain terms criticizes the work of Finkelstein and Silberman.

Jennifer Wallace describes archaeologist Israel Finkelstein's view in her article "Shifting Ground in the Holy Land", appearing in Smithsonian Magazine, May 2006:

He (Israel Finkelstein) cites the fact—now accepted by most archaeologists—that many of the cities Joshua is supposed to have sacked in the late 13th century B.C. had ceased to exist by that time. Hazor was destroyed in the middle of that century, Ai was abandoned before 2000 B.C. Even Jericho (Tell es-Sultan), where Joshua is said to have brought the walls tumbling down by circling the city seven times with blaring trumpets, was destroyed in 1500 B.C. Now controlled by the Palestinian Authority, the Jericho site consists of crumbling pits and trenches that testify to a century of fruitless digging.

— Wallace

However, despite problems with the archaeological record, some maximalists place Joshua in the mid-second millennium, at about the time the Egyptian Empire came to rule over Canaan, and not the 13th century as Finkelstein or Kitchen claims, and view the destruction layers of the period as corroboration of the biblical account. The destruction of Hazor in the mid-13th century is seen as corroboration of the biblical account of the later destruction carried out by Deborah and Barak as recorded in the Book of Judges. The location that Finkelstein refers to as "Ai" is generally dismissed as the location of the biblical Ai, since it was destroyed and buried in the 3rd millennium. The prominent site has been known by that name since at least Hellenistic times, if not before. Minimalists all hold that dating these events as contemporary are etiological explanations written centuries after the events they claim to report.

Both Finkelstein and Silberman do accept that David and Solomon were really existing persons (not kings but bandit leaders or hill country chieftains) from Judah about the 10th century BCE, but they do not assume that there was such a thing as United Monarchy with a capital in Jerusalem.

The Bible reports that Jehoshaphat, a contemporary of Ahab, offered manpower and horses for the northern kingdom's wars against the Arameans. He strengthened his relationship with the northern kingdom by arranging a diplomatic marriage: the Israelite princess Athaliah, sister or daughter of King Ahab, married Jehoram, the son of Jehoshaphat (2 Kings 8:18). The house of David in Jerusalem was now directly linked to (and apparently dominated by) the Israelite royalty of Samaria. In fact, we might suggest that this represented the north's takeover by marriage of Judah. Thus in the ninth century BCE—nearly a century after the presumed time of David—we can finally point to the historical existence of a great united monarchy of Israel, stretching from Dan in the north to Beer-sheba in the south, with significant conquered territories in Syria and Transjordan. But this united monarchy—a real united monarchy—was ruled by the Omrides, not the Davidides, and its capital was Samaria, not Jerusalem.

— Israel Finkelstein and Neil Asher Silberman, page 103

Others, such as David Ussishkin, argue that those who follow the biblical depiction of a United Monarchy do so on the basis of limited evidence while hoping to uncover real archaeological proof in the future. Gunnar Lehmann suggests that there is still a possibility that David and Solomon were able to become local chieftains of some importance and claims that Jerusalem at the time was at best a small town in a sparsely populated area in which alliances of tribal kinship groups formed the basis of society. He goes on further to claim that it was at best a small regional centre, one of three to four in the territory of Judah and neither David nor Solomon had the manpower or the requisite social/political/administrative structure to rule the kind of empire described in the Bible.

These views are strongly criticized by William G. Dever, Helga Weippert, Amihai Mazar and Amnon Ben-Tor. Dever stated that in the 10th century BCE Judah was an "early inchoate state" that would later be fully consolidated in the 9th century BCE, while following the split of the United Monarchy northern Israel had a separate development in the 9th century BCE.

André Lemaire states in Ancient Israel: From Abraham to the Roman Destruction of the Temple that the principal points of the biblical tradition with Solomon are generally trustworthy. Kenneth Kitchen shares this view, arguing that Solomon ruled over a comparatively wealthy "mini-empire", rather than a small city-state. Avraham Faust and Zev Farber have also argued that archaeological evidence supports the idea that David and Solomon ruled over a mini-empire.

Recently, Finkelstein has joined with the more conservative Amihai Mazar to explore the areas of agreement and disagreement and there are signs the intensity of the debate between the so-called minimalist and maximalist scholars is diminishing. This view is also taken by Richard S. Hess, which shows there is in fact a plurality of views between maximalists and minimalists. Jack Cargill has shown that popular textbooks not only fail to give readers up-to-date archaeological evidence, but that they also fail to correctly represent the diversity of views present on the subject. Megan Bishop Moore and Brad E. Kelle provide an overview of the respective evolving approaches and attendant controversies, especially during the period from the mid-1980s through 2011, in their book Biblical History and Israel's Past.

== See also ==
- Academic view of Ezra
- Biblical archaeology school
- Biblical criticism
- Biblical inerrancy
- Census of Quirinius
- Chronology of Jesus
- Composition of the Book of Daniel
- Crucifixion darkness
- Development of the New Testament canon
- Flood geology
- Historical Jesus
- Historicity of Abraham
- Historicity of Esther
- Historicity of Joshua
- Historicity of King David
- Historicity of Moses
- Historicity of the Exodus
- Historicity of the Massacre of the Innocents
- Historicity of the United Monarchy
- Rudolf Bultmann
- Sanhedrin trial of Jesus
- Theudas
