= The Bible with Sources Revealed =

2003 book by Richard Elliott Friedman

- Author: Richard Elliott Friedman
- Subject: Pentateuch
- Publisher: HarperSanFrancisco
- Publication date: 2003
- Publication place: United States
- Pages: 382
- ISBN: 978-0-06-053069-3
- OCLC: 53914150
- Dewey Decimal: 222/.1066 22
- LC Class: BS1223 .F75 2003

Diagram of the 20th century documentary hypothesis.: J: Yahwist (10th–9th century BCE); E: Elohist (9th century BCE); Dtr1: early (7th century BCE) Deuteronomist historian; Dtr2: later (6th century BCE) Deuteronomist historian; P*: Priestly (6th–5th century BCE); D†: Deuteronomist; R: redactor; DH: Deuteronomistic history (books of Joshua, Judges, Samuel, Kings)

The Bible with Sources Revealed (2003) is a book by American biblical scholar Richard Elliott Friedman dealing with the process by which the five books of the Torah or Pentateuch (the "Five Books of Moses") came to be written. Friedman follows the four-source documentary hypothesis model, but differs significantly from Julius Wellhausen's model in several respects.

Most notably, Friedman agrees with Wellhausen on the date of the Deuteronomist (the court of Josiah, c. 621 or 622 BCE), but places the Priestly source at the court of Hezekiah; his sequence of sources therefore runs Jahwist–Elohist–Priestly–Deuteronomist [JEPD] (while Wellhausen order it as Jahwist–Elohist–Deuteronomist–Priestly [JEDP] in his Documentary Hypothesis model). Like Wellhausen, he sees a final redaction in the time of Ezra, c. 450 BCE.

== Summary ==
The core of the book, taking up almost 300 of its approximately 380 pages in the paperback edition, is Friedman's own translation of the five Pentateuchal books, in which the four sources plus the contributions of the two redactors (of the combined JE source and the later redactor of the final document) are indicated typographically. The remaining sections include a short introduction outlining Friedman's thesis, a "Collection of Evidence," and a bibliography.

Friedman's version of the documentary hypothesis can be summarised as follows: The first source to be written down was the Jahwist, or J. This occurred in the Kingdom of Judah, the southern of the two Israelite kingdoms, in the period between 922 and 722 BCE. (Friedman's arguments are dealt with below). The Elohist, or E, was composed in roughly the same period, but probably a little later than J, in the northern kingdom of Israel. In 722 BCE the Assyrian conquest of Israel brought E to Judah with refugees from the northern kingdom.

Shortly after this a redactor combined the two into a standard text, JE, the redactor himself being known as RJE. Then in the reign of Hezekiah, c.715–687 BCE, the Jerusalem priesthood produced a text which they saw as a replacement for JE, the theology of which was objectionable to their project of religious reform: this was the Priestly source, or P. Hezekiah's reform program failed, but was revived in the reign of his great-grandson Josiah, c. 640–609 BCE, producing the last source, the Deuteronomist, or D. The three sources (JE now counting as a single source) existed independently until the return from the Babylonian exile, when a final redactor, R, combined them.

The "Collection of Evidence" section sets out Friedman's arguments for the documentary hypothesis in general and for his own version of it in particular. He notes seven arguments:

- Linguistic: each source (treating JE as a single source) reflects the Hebrew of its period.
- Terminology: Certain words and phrases appear disproportionately, or exclusively, in certain sources.
- Consistent content: Certain concepts, objects, and practices are specific to certain sources.
- Continuity of texts: When separated into sources following linguistic, terminological and contextual clues, each source constitutes a coherent, self-contained narrative.
- Connections with other parts of the Bible: Each source has direct, non-indiscriminate affinities with other specific parts of the Bible.
- Relationships of sources to each other and to history: The sources each have connections to specific circumstances in the history of Israel/Judah, and to each other.

== Comparison with Wellhausen ==
As Friedman himself says in his Who Wrote the Bible?, when a scholar agrees with the documentary hypothesis, he agrees with Wellhausen; when he wishes to propose a new model of the hypothesis, he compares it with Wellhausen. Friedman agrees with Wellhausen on the identity of the four sources, and on the identification of certain possible or probable authors: Jeremiah and/or his scribe, Baruch ben Neriah, as the author of D, Ezra as the Redactor. (These identifications in fact were made long before Wellhausen: the identification of the Redactor with Ezra can be traced to Spinoza in the 17th century or even Jerome in the 4th). Where he departs most radically from Wellhausen is in dating P to the time of Hezekiah, almost a century before Josiah and the D source. Wellhausen's placing of P after D, so that the sequence of sources was JEDP, was crucial to the view of the development of Israelite religion from original polytheism to Judaic monotheism; Friedman's reordering of the sources is thus his major challenge to Wellhausen's model, as it undermines Wellhausen's thesis that the Priestly Code represents the final development of a priest-centred religious practice. Friedman's dating of J to the time of the divided kingdom—Wellhausen put it in the 10th century BCE rather than the 8th—is also novel, but less so than his ordering of the sources.

== Critical assessment ==
The documentary hypothesis as defined by Wellhausen, having dominated critical thinking on the origin of the Pentateuch, came into increasing question from the late 1960s onwards as alternative models - supplementary and fragmentary rather than the discrete documents of the DH paradigm - were put forward. Friedman's book is thus in one sense an answer to these critics, and perhaps especially to R. N. Whybray, whose 1987 The Making of the Pentateuch had concluded that the tools by which the documentary model distinguished its supposed documents were fundamentally faulty: how could they suppose, he asked, that the authors of each of the four so-called source documents had not tolerated inconsistency, but that the two redactors had had no problems with it?

Scholars as eminent as Baruch Halpern and Michael D. Coogan (editor of The New Oxford Annotated Bible) welcomed The Bible with Sources Revealed as an indispensable teaching tool; nevertheless, Friedman's departures from Wellhausen have been criticised by his professional colleagues on several grounds, not least for ignoring all other models and all advances in scholarship outside his preferred documentary model.

For example, the review in the Review of Biblical Literature noted:

"It is basic for the understanding of biblical literary history that the Supplementary Hypothesis is the 'normal hypothesis' (even within the Pentateuch) and that the Documentary Hypothesis (i.e., the fusion of two literary sources) is only a notable exception."

Also, some scholars advocated 'the Fragmentary hypothesis' for another major text-critical approach to the Pentateuch's authorship.

Moreover, Friedman was criticised for ignoring evidence that P did not precede Deuteronomy, for an arbitrary approach to his assignment of sources, and for failing to note or argue with scholarship that does not support his argument.

On the other hand, his close examination of R (and RJE) was welcomed as innovative and useful, as was his schematisation of the arguments in favour of the documentary model.
