= The Making of the Pentateuch =

Book by R. N. Whybray (1987)

- Author: R. N. Whybray
- Language: English
- Genre: Non-fiction
- Publisher: JSOT Press
- Publication date: 1987
- Publication place: United Kingdom

The Making of the Pentateuch ("The Making of the Pentateuch: A Methodological Study", JSOT Press, Sheffield, 1987) by R. N. Whybray, Professor of Hebrew and Old Testament Studies at the University of Hull (UK), was a major contribution to the field of Old Testament studies, and specifically to theories on the origins and composition of the Pentateuch. Its originality lay in its detailed critique of the documentary hypothesis, and it remains a standard text on many reading lists.

== Background ==
For almost a century prior to Whybray's book, a scholarly consensus had developed regarding the question of Pentateuchal origins – the composition and dates of the first five books of the Old Testament. In the closing decades of the 19th century Julius Wellhausen published Prolegomena zur Geschichte Israels, in which he had set out the definitive version of the historical development of the Hebrew Bible. According to this hypothesis, the Pentateuch – Genesis, Exodus, Leviticus, Numbers and Deuteronomy – was originally four separate documents, retelling the same episodes and stories, but with differing emphases designed to further the theological and political agendas of their authors. Their combination by a Redactor (editor) into a single narrative spread over five books had resulted in many inconsistencies and repetitious stories, which could be analysed through the methodology of source criticism to reconstruct the original documents.

Wellhausen had concentrated exclusively on the written text of the Pentateuch, but in the next generation Hermann Gunkel developed form criticism, a methodology which he claimed could identify the various genres which had contributed to the text and thus reconstruct its tradition history. Gunkel and his followers, notably Martin Noth, used this new methodology to discover the oral sagas which formed the basis of the written texts of the Pentateuch.

By the middle of the 20th century, Wellhausen's documentary hypothesis, the tradition history of Gunkel and Noth, and the Biblical archaeology of William F. Albright, who claimed to have found physical proof of the 2nd millennium BC origins of Genesis, Exodus, and the other books of the Pentateuch, had merged to form a dominant paradigm, or consensual view, of the origins of the Pentateuch. It was this paradigm that was challenged by Whybray's "The Making of the Pentateuch".

== Summary ==
The Making of the Pentateuch (in fact only Genesis–Numbers, as Whybray excludes Deuteronomy) is in three parts. Part 1 examines the methodology and assumptions of source criticism and the Documentary Hypothesis; Part 2 examines the methodology of form criticism and tradition history as developed by Noth and others; and Part 3 sets out Whybray's own suggestions for the process by which the Pentateuch came to be composed.

Whybray's attack on the documentary hypothesis addressed the basic methodology of source criticism, which relies on the existence of inconsistencies, repetitions and stylistic features such as alternative names for God to identify distinctive sources within the biblical text. The assumptions behind this methodology, Whybray says, are illogical and self-contradictory. If the authors of the original documents did not tolerate contradiction and repetition, why did the editors of the final work do so? And if the writers who created the final document did not mind such features, why should we suppose that the earlier sources did not contain contradiction and repetition? "Thus the hypothesis can only be maintained on the assumption that, while consistency was the hallmark of the various documents, inconsistency was the hallmark of the redactors" (p. 19). Similarly, the repetition and stylistic variation which the documentary hypothesis explains as the remains of distinct sources, may be understood quite differently. For example, since other religious texts use a variety of names for God, why should the change of divine name in Genesis from Yahweh to Elohim signal a change of source? There could be a theological reason why one name is preferred to another, or the writer may just want a change. Repetition is often done for stylistic reasons, or for emphasis, or for rhetorical effect or in poetic parallelism. The task of form and tradition critics, according to Whybray, is even more difficult than that of source critics. Where the latter are dealing with partially extant texts, the former are dealing with hypothetical reconstructions for which we have no tangible evidence: "Much of Noth's detailed reconstruction of the Pentateuchal traditions was obtained by piling one speculation upon another." (p. 20)

His critique of scholars such as Rolf Rendtorff and Erhard Blum (a student of Rendtorff), who worked after Noth but in the same form and tradition-critical school was even more trenchant. These scholars contributed to what is known as the Supplementary hypothesis.

According to Whybray:

"Rendtorff has merely replaced the comparatively simple Documentary Hypothesis which postulated only a small number of written sources and redactors with a bewildering multiplicity of sources and redactors" (p. 21), while Blum's approach was, if anything, more complex and more dogmatic – not to mention less demonstrable – than Rendtorff's.

Whybray's own, alternative hypothesis, is based not on the documentary model but on a fragmentary model. He suggests that the Pentateuch was the product of a single author (not the four authors and multiple editors of the documentary hypothesis) working at some time in the 6th century BC "[with] a mass of material, most of which may have been of quite recent origin and had not necessarily formed part of any ancient Israelite tradition" (p. 242). Whybray saw this author as a national historian, aware of contemporary Greek history and writing in conscious imitation of Greek models, with the aim of extending the existing Deuteronomic history backwards in time to create a national history of the Israelites from the creation of the world.

== Assessment ==
The Making of the Pentateuch has been described as "the most compelling critique of the [documentary] hypothesis" ever made, and its arguments are frequently cited by evangelical Christians who wish to state the case for Mosaic authorship (although Whybray explicitly rejects this notion and states that he regards the Pentateuch as fiction). Gordon Wenham, for example, writing in 1996, "Whybray's work on the Pentateuch could be viewed as the logical conclusion of the direction in which most pentateuchal criticism has been moving in the last three decades. ... His book is a powerful and valid critique of the methods that have been taken for granted in Pentateuchal criticism for nearly two centuries."

Egyptologist and Bible scholar James K. Hoffmeier has affirmed that although Whybray offers the most comprehensive critique of the documentary hypothesis within recent critical scholarship, he concludes that Whybray's view doesn't actually advance pentateuchal studies but instead revives a late 18th, early 19th century theory held by Alexander Geddes and J.S. Vater.
