= Heike Friis =

Danish theologian and parish priest (1943–2015)

Heike Friis (27 April 1943, – 1 April 2015) was a Danish theologian and parish priest.

== Biography ==
Heike Friis was born on 27 April 1943 in Hamburg. She grew up in Sæd in South Denmark, near the German border. She graduated from the University of Copenhagen in 1968 with a candidate thesis that won the university's gold medal titled "The Background in and outside of Israel for the Emergence of David's Empire". The thesis represented a break with the conservative tradition of Biblical exegesis, arguing that the Biblical historical narratives presuppose the Babylonian exile. This idea was important in introducing the narrative approach to exegesis that became the hallmark of the Copenhagen school in theology. It was however not formally published until 1986, when it was published in German as "Die Bedingungen für die Errichtung des Davidischen Reichs in Israel und seiner Umwelt".

Subsequently, she worked as a faculty member at the priest seminary of Haslev, and as an external lecturer in theology at the University of Copenhagen, and finally as a parish priest in the church of Sjælør. She retired in 2003. She lived from 2009 in her hometown Sæd until her death on 1 April 2015 in Aabenraa.
