= Richard Elliott Friedman =

American biblical scholar and theologian (born 1946)

- Born: May 5, 1946 (age 80); Rochester, New York, U.S.
- Awards: American Council of Learned Societies Fellow

Academic background
- Education: University of Miami; Jewish Theological Seminary); Harvard University

Academic work
- Discipline: Biblical studies, theology
- Institutions: University of California, San Diego; University of Georgia
- Main interests: Hebrew Bible, Documentary hypothesis

Richard Elliott Friedman (born May 5, 1946) is an American biblical scholar, theologian, and translator who currently serves as the Ann and Jay Davis Professor of Jewish Studies at the University of Georgia.

== Life and career ==
Friedman was born in Rochester, New York. He attended the University of Miami (BA, 1968), the Jewish Theological Seminary (MHL, 1971), and Harvard University (Th.M. in Hebrew Bible, 1974; Th.D. in Hebrew Bible and Near Eastern Languages and Civilizations, 1978). He was the Katzin Professor of Jewish Civilization: Hebrew Bible; Near Eastern Languages and Literature at the University of California, San Diego, from 1994 until 2006, whereupon he joined the faculty of the University of Georgia's Religion Department, where he is currently the Ann and Jay Davis Professor of Jewish Studies. Friedman teaches courses in Hebrew, Bible, and Jewish Studies.

He is a winner of numerous awards and honors, including American Council of Learned Societies Fellow. He was a visiting fellow at the University of Cambridge and the University of Oxford; and a Senior Fellow of the American Schools of Oriental Research in Jerusalem. He participated in the City of David Project archaeological excavations of biblical Jerusalem. In his work Who Wrote the Bible?, he provides an updated analysis of the documentary hypothesis.

== Origin of the P and the D source ==
Friedman is of the view that the P Source of the Bible was composed during the time of Hezekiah. P for instance "emphasizes centralization of religion: one center, one altar, one Tabernacle, one place of sacrifice. Who was the king who began centralization? King Hezekiah."

According to Friedman, and others who follow the theories of Julius Wellhausen regarding the formation of Israel's religion, P is the work of the Aaronid priesthood. They are the priests in authority at the central altar – not Moses, not Korah, nor any other Levites. Only those descended from Aaron can be priests. Friedman then went on to say "P always speaks of two distinct groups, the priests and the Levites. Who was the king who formalized the divisions between priests and Levites? King Hezekiah." Chronicles reported explicitly:

"Hezekiah assigned (Hebrew יעמד) the priests and Levites to divisions—each of them according to their duties as priests or Levites." (2 Chronicles 31:2)

Friedman wrote that the "Aaronid priesthood that produced P had opponents, Levites who saw Moses and not Aaron as their model. What was the most blatant reminder of Moses' power that was visible in Judah? The bronze serpent 'Nehushtan'. According to tradition, stated explicitly in E, Moses had made it. It had the power to save people from snakebite. Who was the king who smashed the Nehushtan? Hezekiah."

Friedman has also proposed that the prophet Jeremiah, working together with his scribe Baruch, was also the person that is the D-source, the Deuteronomist, who wrote/rewrote the books of Deuteronomy, Joshua, Judges, Samuel and Kings. In his book Who wrote the Bible? he gave supporting evidence pointing towards this identification and also notes that in the Talmud Jeremiah was already seen as the author of the Books of Kings. In his view this part of the Bible must be seen as one major theological history, which centers on the covenant between the Jews and Yahweh promising eternal prosperity for Israel but demanding that they should worship only Yahweh. In a long cycle of infidelity-defeat-repentance-forgiveness the Jewish history is written. According to him, the history first ended with King Josiah as the ultimate god-fearing king and was later rewritten after the fall of the kingdom in 586 BE, putting the blame on the evil done under Manasseh, writing "No king ever arose like Josiah. ... But Yahweh did not turn back from his great fury which burned against Judah over all the things in which Manasseh had angered him" (2 Kings 23:25–26).

== On the Exodus ==
In his 2017 book The Exodus: How It Happened and Why It Matters, Friedman argues that the Exodus was a historical event, and that it involved only a few thousand people who left Egypt during the reign of Ramesses II (r. 1279 – 1213 BC) or his son Merneptah (r. 1213 – 1210 BC).

This proposed group later merged with the Israelites, and introduced the cult of Yahweh in Caanan, together with the idea of monotheism/monolatry, possibly inspired by the earlier religious reforms of Akhenaten (r. c. 1351 – 1336 BC), known as the Amarna Period in Egyptology. Once established in Israel and Judah, Yahweh's cult supplanted the cult of the Caananite god El, and the two gods became one and the same in Israelite religious mentality. This group of migrants would later form the Tribe of Levi. Friedman argues this was vital for the formation of monotheism.

One piece of evidence Friedman uses for his hypothesis is the Egyptian names that the biblical Levites have. Names like Moses, Aaron, Phineas may have Egyptian origins. Friedman also notes the similarities of the Tabernacle with the Battle Tent of Ramesses II. Friedman mentions the Torah’s Levite sources often refer to a commandment to treat stranger in your land well, for “you were strangers in the land of Egypt.”

The name Yahweh, according to Friedman, was probably inspired by the Shasu deity Yhw, whose presence is attested by two Egyptian texts from the time of Pharaohs Amenhotep III (14th century BCE) and Ramesses II (13th century BCE). Friedman also hypothesizes the Levites may have encountered Yahweh worship in Midian.

Friedman also rejects the idea that Jewish monotheism was born during the Babylonian captivity (see Deutero-Isaiah) and argues that the concept of monotheism/monolatry was present in the Israelite people since the 12th century BCE, although for many centuries it met strong resistance from polytheistic sectors of Israel.

== On the Temple ==
Friedman argues that it was not the Babylonians who destroyed the First Temple, but Edomites. He bases his argument on texts like Psalm 137 and Obadiah 10.

== Writings ==
- Richard Elliot Friedman, Who Wrote the Bible?, Harper San Francisco, 1987 (second edition 1997, third edition 2019).
- Richard Elliot Friedman, The Disappearance of God: A Divine Mystery, Little, Brown and Company, 1995.
- Richard Elliot Friedman, The Hidden Face of God, Harper San Francisco, 1996.
- Richard Elliot Friedman, The Hidden Book in the Bible, Harper San Francisco, 1999.
- Richard Elliot Friedman, Commentary on the Torah, Harper San Francisco, 2003.
- Richard Elliot Friedman, The Bible with Sources Revealed, HarperOne, 2009.
- Richard Elliot Friedman and Shawna Dolansky, The Bible Now, Oxford University Press, 2011.
- Richard Elliot Friedman, The Exodus, HarperOne, 2017.
