= Redaction (editorial synthesis) =

Combining and altering of source texts into a single document

Redaction is a form of editing in which multiple sources of texts are combined and altered slightly to make a single document. Often this is a method of collecting a series of writings on a similar theme and creating a definitive and coherent work.

== Forms ==
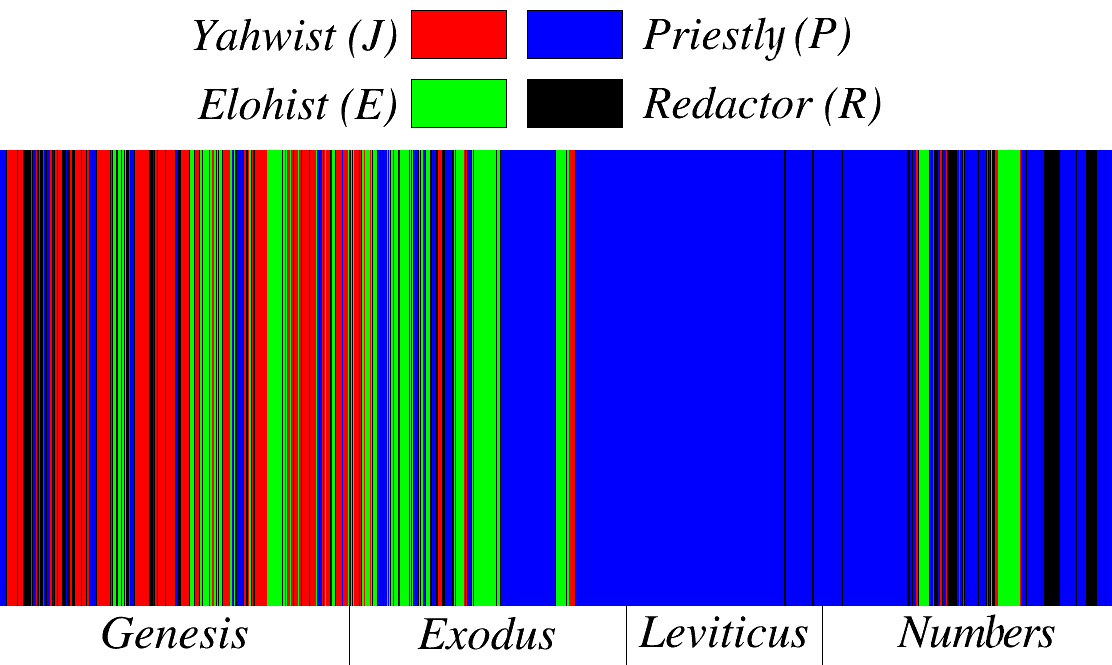
Friedman's distribution of materials by source of the first four books of the Hebrew Bible, including a redactor (black), according to the documentary hypothesis

On occasion, the persons performing the redaction (the redactors) add brief elements of their own. The reasons for doing so are varied and can include the addition of elements to adjust the underlying conclusions of the text to suit the redactor's opinion, adding bridging elements to integrate disparate stories, or to add a frame story, such as the tale of Scheherazade which frames the collection of folk tales in The Book of One Thousand and One Nights.

Sometimes the source texts are interlaced, particularly when discussing closely related details, things, or people. This is common when source texts contain alternative versions of the same story, and slight alterations are often made in this circumstance, simply to make the texts appear to agree, and thus the resulting redacted text appears to be coherent. Such a situation is proposed by the documentary hypothesis in the academic field of biblical scholarship, which affirms that multiple redactions occurred during the composition of the Torah, often combining source texts with different narratives, which have rival political attitudes and aims, together; another example is the Talmud.

Redactional processes are documented in numerous disciplines, including ancient literary works and biblical studies. Much has been written on the role of redaction in creating meaning for texts in various formats.

== See also ==
- Fix-up
- Redaction criticism
- Textual criticism
