= R. N. Whybray =

British biblical scholar (1923–1997)

Roger Norman Whybray (1923–1998) was a biblical scholar and specialist in Hebrew studies. Whybray read French and Theology at Oxford and was ordained as priest in the Church of England.

After a number of minor teaching posts, he held the position of Professor of Old Testament and Hebrew at Central Theological College, Tokyo, 1952–1965. He returned to Oxford in 1960–61 to prepare for a DPhil under G. R. Driver, his thesis subsequently being published as Wisdom in Proverbs: The Concept of Wisdom in Proverbs 19. In 1965 he became lecturer in Theology in the University of Hull, becoming Professor of Hebrew and Old Testament Studies in 1978. He retired in 1982 in order to devote himself to his scholarly writing.

== Publications ==
In The Intellectual Tradition in the Old Testament (1974) Whybray questioned the common scholarly assumption that there was in ancient Israel a class of 'wise men' or intellectuals who controlled affairs of state and to whose interests and outlook we owe the biblical 'wisdom literature'. Whybray put forward the proposition that the evidence for any such group of wise men in ancient Israel was lacking, that 'wisdom' was not the preserve of a class or an institution, and the wise were simply educated citizens "who were accustomed to read for education and pleasure". Wisdom literature, according to Whybray, was therefore the product of literary-minded individuals among the intellectuals.

In The Making of the Pentateuch (1987) Whybray examined the evidence for the documentary hypothesis, the dominant hypothesis on the origins of the Pentateuch for more than a century, and concluded that it was insubstantial. His alternative proposal was that the Pentateuch was essentially the work of a single author who drew upon multiple sources and disregarded, or was ignorant of, modern notions of literary consistency and smoothness of style and language. The book remained the most complete critique of the documentary hypothesis by a mainstream biblical scholar for at least a decade from its publication.

Whybray wrote the chapter on Genesis in the Oxford Bible Commentary, edited by John Barton and John Muddiman (2001).
